= Church of Saint Louis, Grenoble =

Church building in Grenoble, France

Coordinates: 45.1898°N 5.7258°E

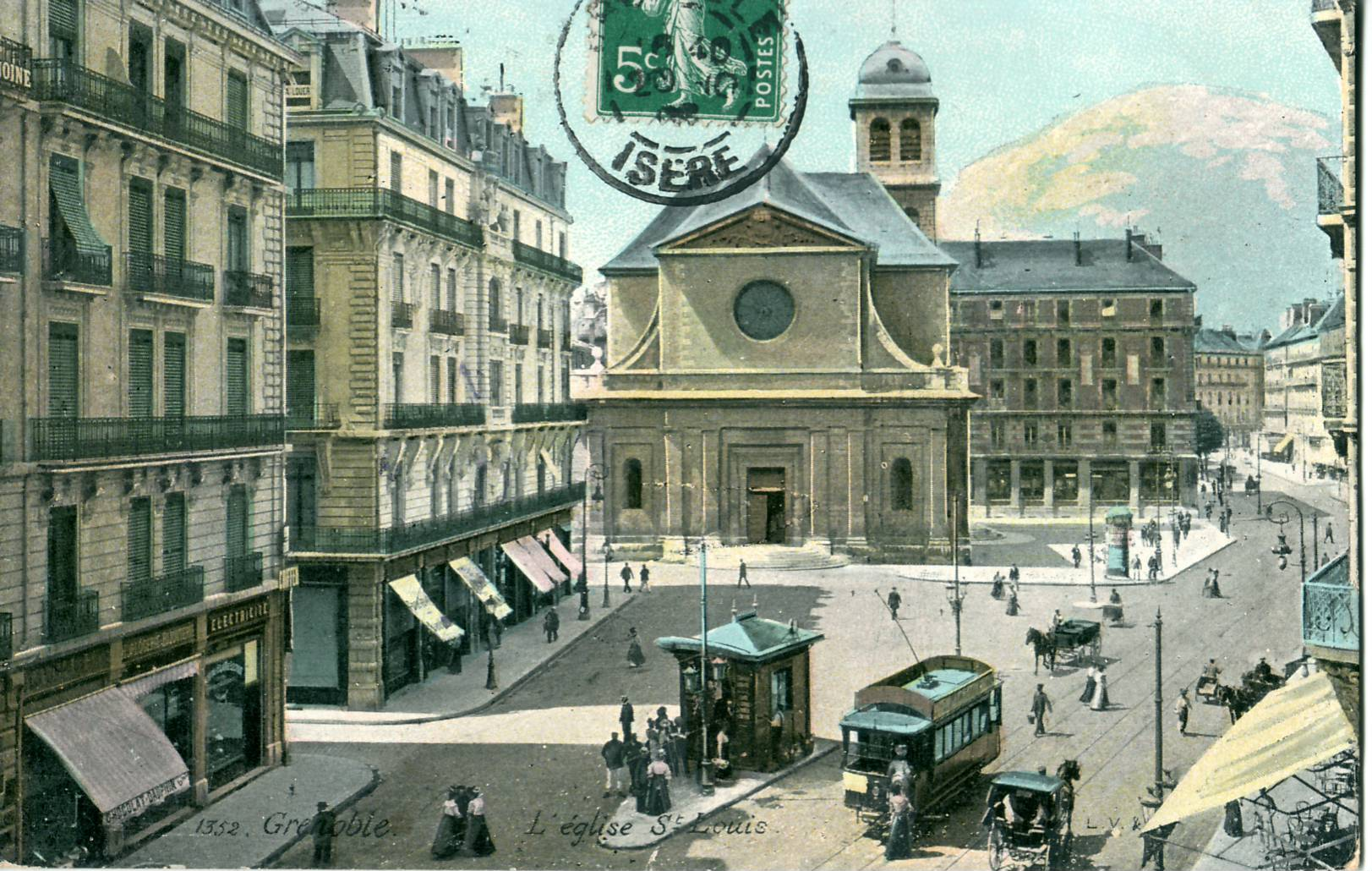
Church of Saint Louis in 1905.

The Church of Saint Louis (French: Église Saint-Louis de Grenoble) is a Roman Catholic church in Grenoble, France.

== History ==
At the request of the bishop Étienne Le Camus, the first stone of the church of Saint Louis was built between 1689 and 1699. Claude Mollard, a king's engineer and local architect, drew up the plans according to the classical French style. For reasons of economy, the architecture is deliberately sober.

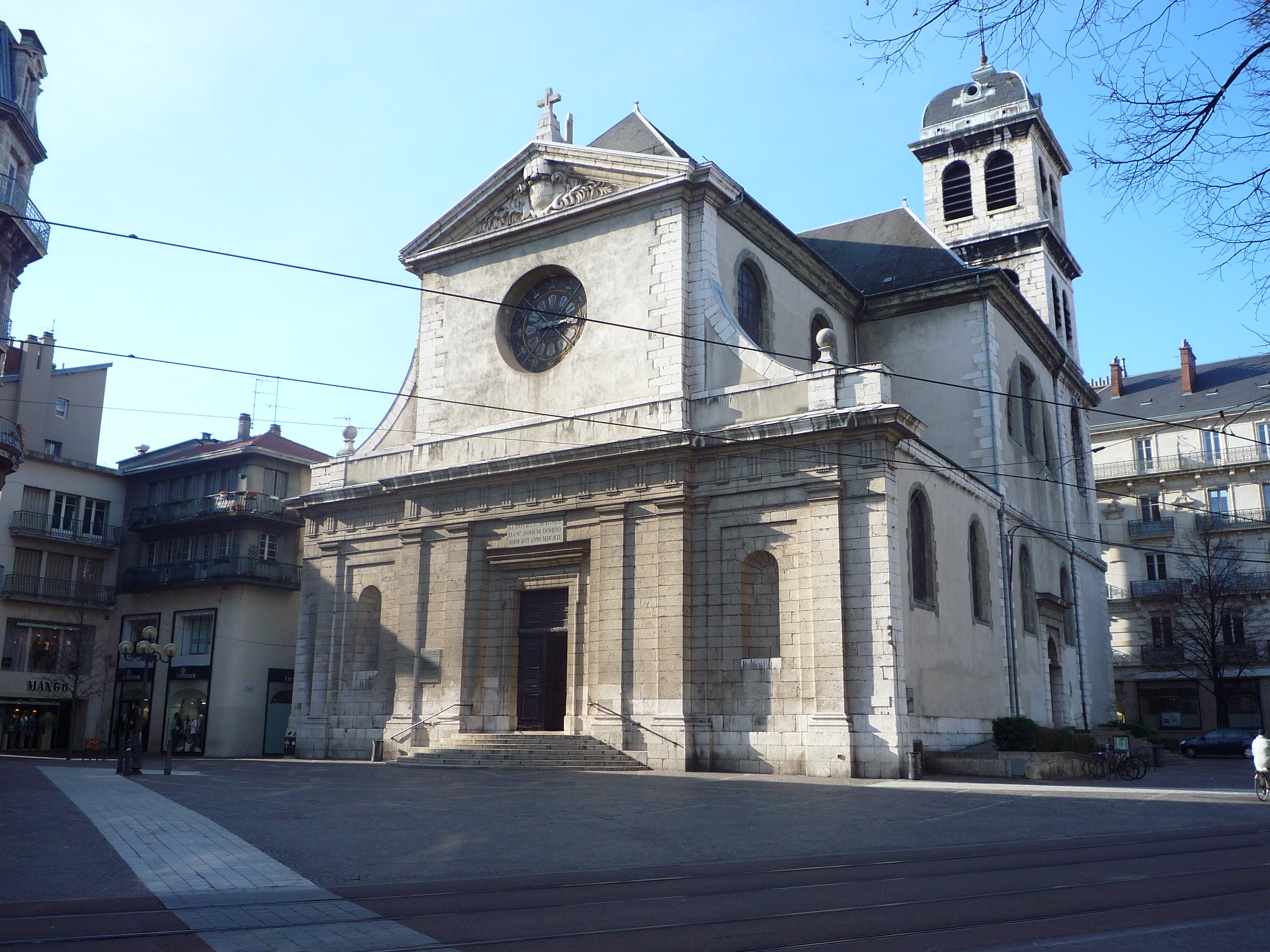
Church today

There is a groined vault in the nave, a semi-circular barrel-vault in the arms of the transept, and a cupola dominating the transept crossing. The actual organ replaced the organ from Saint-Antoine-l'Abbaye brought here in September 1805 and transferred back to St Antoine in 1980. The new organ is the work of the French organ builder Bartolome Formentelli. It is more complete than the former one as it has sixty-one keys instead of forty.

The stained glass windows are recognizable as two different styles. Some date to 1925 and adorn four windows of the aisles. Others date to 1934, and adorn both the lower and higher windows at the ends of the transept. The stained glass windows were produced by the master glass-maker Louis Balmet.

Outside, a black marble plaque bears a Latin inscription which means: "Louis the Great erected this house for the Lord in the year 1699".

== Interior ==
The interior of the church contains a figure of the Virgin Mary in white marble of the 16th century; paintings dated 1680 and the hand of a Dominican friar, Brother André; confessionals and a pulpit dating from the 17th century in walnut wood and an 18th-century altar.

The great organ was built in 1746-1747 by Samson Scherrer, replaced in 1980 by a new organ made by Bartolomeo Fromentelli including 61 consoles and 4600 pipes.

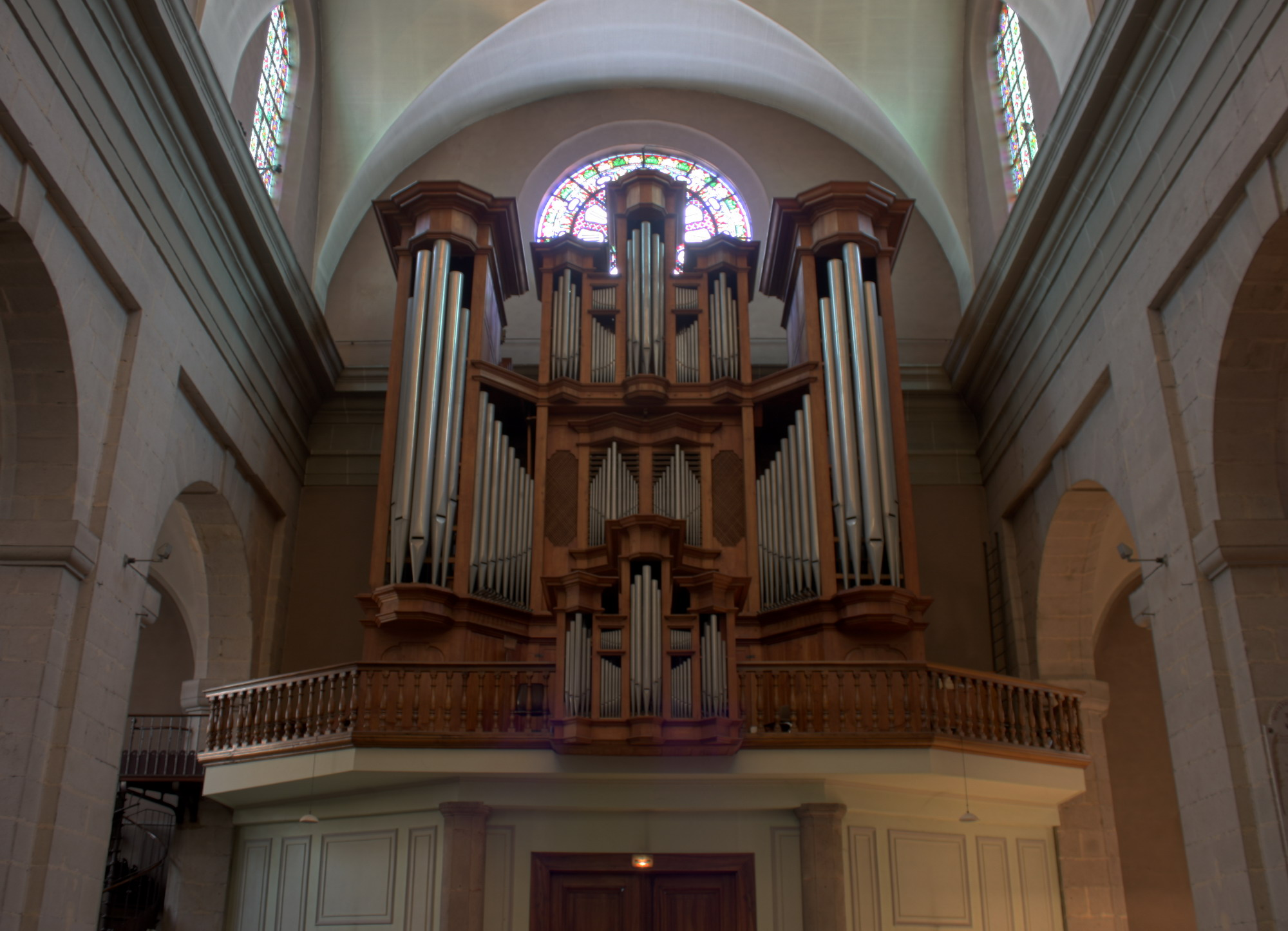
The organ
