= Grenoble flood 1859 =

Historically, centenarian floods did extensive damage in the Isere valley. In October 1859, it rained continuously for five days. A warm wind melted the snow, and the temperature suddenly increased from 12 to 19 degrees on 2 November. The simultaneity of those two events resulted in an exceptional flood. In a single night, the water in Grenoble rose at a rate of 15 to 20 cm per hour.

== Grenoble Flood 1859 ==
On 2 November, water levels in the city reached 5.35m above the average low water mark, rising so quickly that people who went out with dry feet couldn't go home half an hour later. The whole inner city was flooded. In the streets, the water rose from 1m 32 cm to 1m 50 cm, making normal movement impossible and forcing people to move in rafts. The violence of the water current aggravated the destruction, especially city infrastructure such as the Saint-Laurent bridge. Six people died during this flood, and the hospital had to retain its dead until 17 November, because they couldn't bury them in Saint Roch Cemetery . Casualty figures stayed low because the river rose relatively gently in the actual city of Grenoble.

From an economic point of view, stocks of goods were destroyed. Stocks that had been set up by traders in order to prepare for big markets in November, like the market of Saint Andre, and military stocks, were washed away.

There was at that time a wall around Grenoble, dating from Roman times. Parts of these remains are still visible. The objective was to prevent flood water from entering into the city. The cost of the 1859 flood damage to these walls added up to over 400 000 French Francs, valued in the local currency at the time of the event.

== Existing risks ==
Since then, public works have been done on the rivers, hydraulic dams and flood barrier river development. These developments have limited the subsequent extent of flooding. A government entity has been created, called "le Syndicat Mixte des Bassins Hydrauliques", which now manages the landscapes and provides prevention against the potential risks of modern flooding.

Despite the construction of dams, which were designed to protect the people living next to the Isère, the town of Grenoble is still threatened by floods. Although for more than a century big floods haven't occurred, that doesn't exclude the threat. Eleven ruptures were noticed after the flood of 1859. These ruptures occurred at weak spots including boucle du bois Francais, boucle de la Taillat (although the dam here is being reinforced), boucle de Gières, courbe du campus. In 2001, the Isère attained a volume of 1000 m³/s, which caused local flooding almost everywhere there were modern weak spots. Some dams in the Grenoble catchment area are very weak, in bad condition and not large enough to contain flooding. It was only in 2011 that the government took action, and decided to invest in 112 projects, called SYMBHI that will take seven years and will help reinforce the dam system. These were financed on the basis that it is cheaper to prevent that to repair. This project is 42% financed by the General Council of Isere, 30% by the government, the ‘'intercomunalite ‘’ finances 20% and the "Eau Rhône-Méditerranée et Corse" 8%. Projects will start in pont de Charat and will end in Grenoble centre. In case of a major crisis, the losses could be evaluated at 400 or 500 million euros if the a disaster similar to that of 1859 were to happen again. Modern technology can predict a flood in the Isère 6 to 10 hours before it occurs. An estimated 300,000 Grenoble citizens are directly exposed to floods. Finally, even though the flood of Isere in 1859 caused much damage, only 6 people died.

== The Flow of the Isère during the flood ==
There is currently a probability of one in ten that the flow of the Isere could attain 900 square metres per second (m/s), which would cause very little overflow. There is a probability of one in a hundred that this could rise to 1200 m/s, which is regarded as a dangerous scenario. There is a one in two hundred probability of flow rates of 1600 m/s, as in the flood of 1859.

== Le Serpent et le Dragon Fountain ==
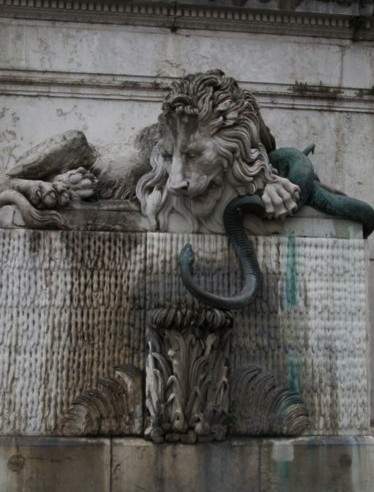
Le Serpent et le Dragon Fountain, Grenoble

Next to the Saint-Laurent Bridge in the Place de la Cymaise, there is a fountain which represents the struggle against the waters. It was built by Pierre-Victor Sappey in 1840. The sculpture consists of a lion and a snake. Next to the fountain is written an Arpitan proverb: "La serpen et lo dragon mettront Grenoblo en savon" which means "the snake and the dragon will destroy Grenoble". The serpent symbolizes the Isère and the Dragon symbolizes the Drac. On the statue there is a lion's head instead of a dragon.

== Bibliography ==
- Louise Drevet, D.V, 1986. Nouvelles et Legendes Dauphinoises. Grenoble: J.P. Debbane.
- Muller, C. and Louis, E., 1976. L'Isère d'Autrefois. Grenoble: Editions des 4 seigneurs.
- Donnet, G.,1982. Le Dauphiné. Les Editions du Bastion.
- Guibal, Jean,1997. Grenoble traces d'histoires. Grenoble: Edition Le Dauphiné
