= Drevet =

Drevet may refer to:

- Camille Drevet (1881-1969), French anti-colonialist, feminist, and pacifist activist
- Jacques Drevet (1832-1900), French architect
- Louise Drevet (1835-1898), French novelist
- Drevet family, leading portrait engravers of France
