= Le Magasin =

Museum in Grenoble, France

Coordinates: 45°11′15″N 5°42′16″E

Le Magasin - Centre National d'Art Contemporain
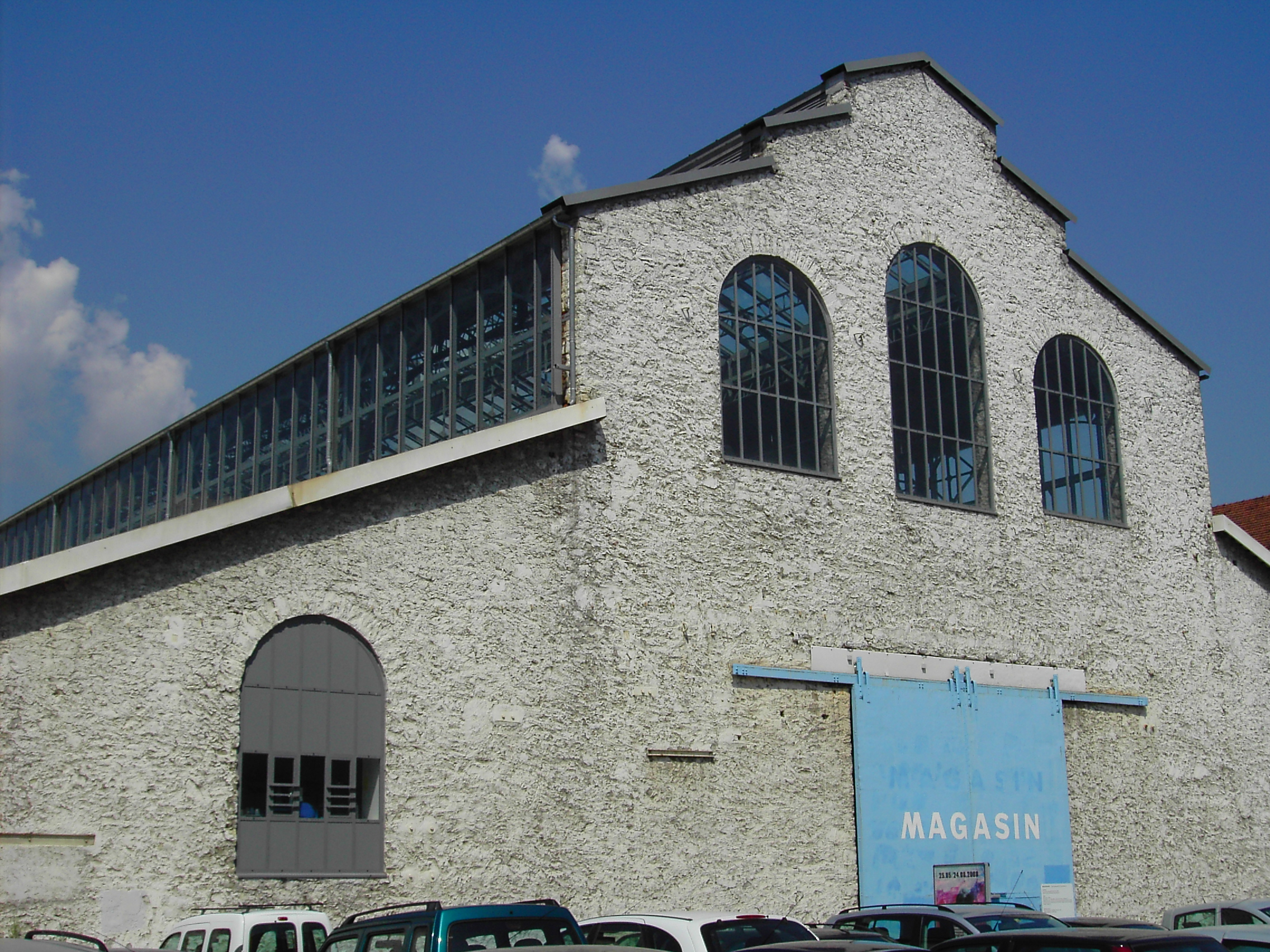
- Established: 1986
- Location: Site Bouchayer Viallet, 155 cours Berriat, 38000 Grenoble, France
- Director: Yves Aupetitallot
- Website: www.magasin-cnac.org

Founded in 1986, Le Magasin – Centre National d'Art Contemporain is housed in an industrial hall, built for the 1900 Paris World's Fair by the workshops of Gustave Eiffel. Manufacturers Bouchayer and Viallet, working in the area of hydroelectric equipment, bought the iron structure and reassembled it in Grenoble, France.

Its exhibitions focus on contemporary art. Every three months, Le Magasin's spaces are devoted to a new series of solo shows and/or collective exhibitions, presented in a resolutely prospective approach and developed in close collaboration with the invited artists. Art appreciation workshops, training, and conferences are organized in coordination with the current exhibits. The museum also publishes books and catalogs concerning its exhibits.
