= Maison du Tourisme =

Municipal French regulatory body of tourism

A Maison du Tourisme is usually the municipal French regulatory body of tourism; i.e., Maison du Tourisme de Grenoble.
