= Étienne Le Camus =

French Catholic cardinal

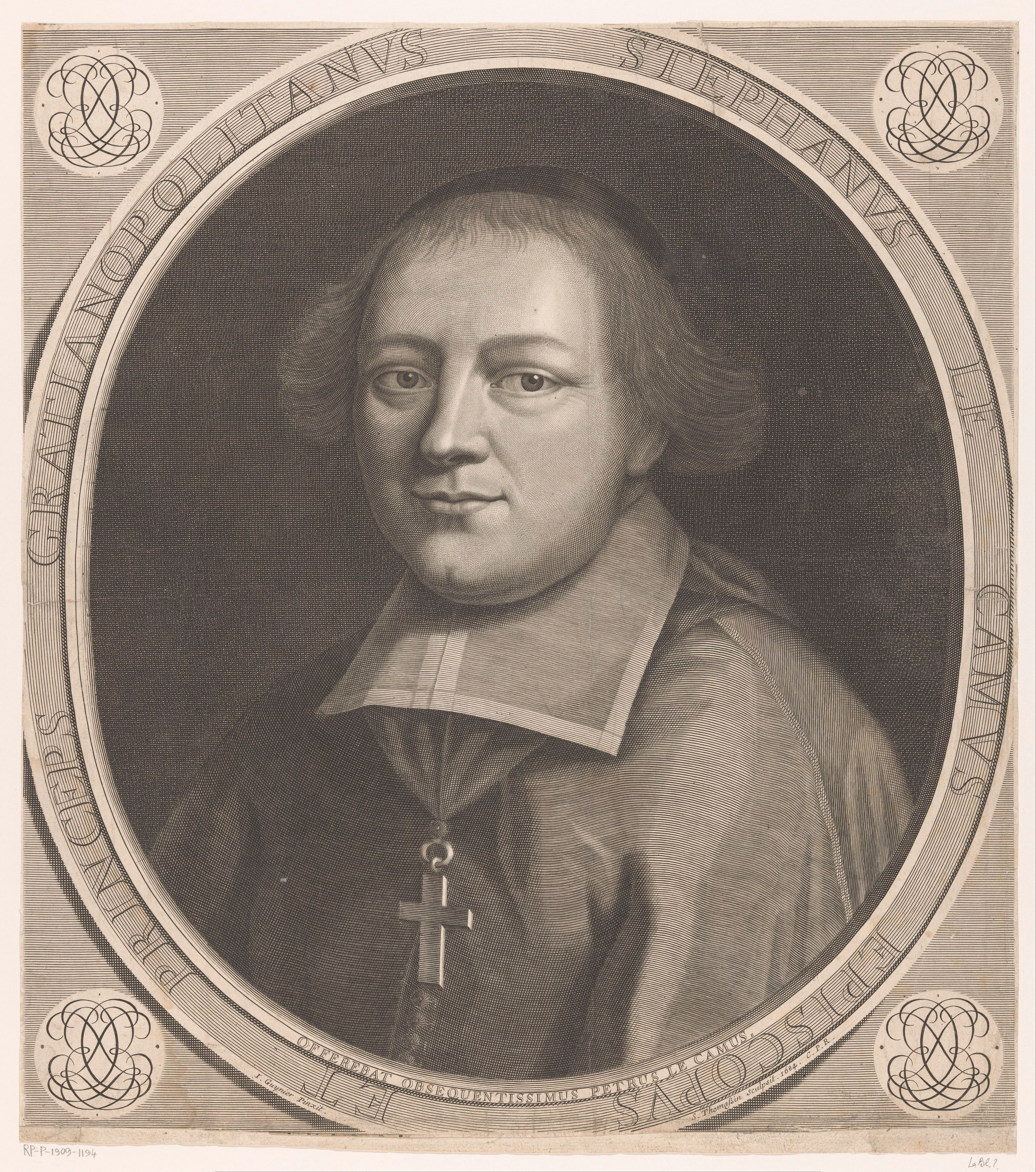
Étienne Le Camus

Étienne Le Camus (1632, Paris – Grenoble, 1707) was a French cardinal.

== Biography ==
Through the influence of his father, Nicolas le Camus, a state councillor, he was when still very young attached to the court as almoner of the king, and enjoyed the friendship of Bossuet. The Sorbonne made him doctor of theology at the age of eighteen.

The fact of his consorting with such men as Benserade, Vivonne, and Bussy drew upon him the severity of Mazarin, and he was for a while exiled to Meaux. Recalled through the influence of Colbert, he retired in 1665 to La Trappe Abbey with de Rancé, and passed from his former levity to an asceticism that led him to Port-Royal.

The publication of his letters by Ingold shows that Jansenism was with Le Camus more a matter of personal sympathy and spiritual discipline than of doctrinal tenets. Made against his will Bishop of Grenoble in 1671, he proved himself zealous almost to excess in reforming abuses in his diocese. In the affair of the régale he acted as intermediary between Rome and Versailles, and showed creditable courage before the omnipotent Louis XIV.

Pope Innocent XI having made him cardinal instead of Harlay, presented by the king, he was not allowed till 1689 to go to Rome to receive the insignia of his dignity. Le Camus founded in the Diocese of Grenoble two seminaries and several charitable institutions.

== Works ==
Camus's works include the Recueil d'ordonnances synodales, the Défense de la Virginité perpétuelle de la Mère de Dieu (Paris, 1680), and numerous letters published by Ingold.

== Sources ==
- Bellet, Charles-Félix (1886. Histoire du Cardinal Le Camus, évêque et prince de Grenoble. (in French). Paris: Alphonse Picard, 1886.
- Godel, J., et al. (eds.) (1974). Le Cardinal des montagnes. Etienne Le Camus Evêque de Grenoble (1671–1707). (in French). Grenoble, 1974.
- Ingold, Augustin Marie Pierre (ed.) (1892). Lettres du cardinal Le Camus, évêque et prince de Grenoble. (in French). Paris: A. Picard, 1892.
- Sainte-Beuve, Charles Augustin (1878). Port-Royal. (in French). Volume 4, 4th edition. Paris: Hachette 1878. Pp. 528-555.
- ST-SIMON, Mémoires (ed. HACHETTE), IV 59 to be corrected by LALOUETTE, Abrégé de la vie de M. le Cardinal Le Camus (Paris, 1720)

- This article cites:
