= Grenoble =

Prefecture and commune in Auvergne-Rhône-Alpes, France

Grenoble Grenoblo / Grainóvol (Arpitan) Grenòble / Graçanòbol (Occitan)
- Prefecture and commune
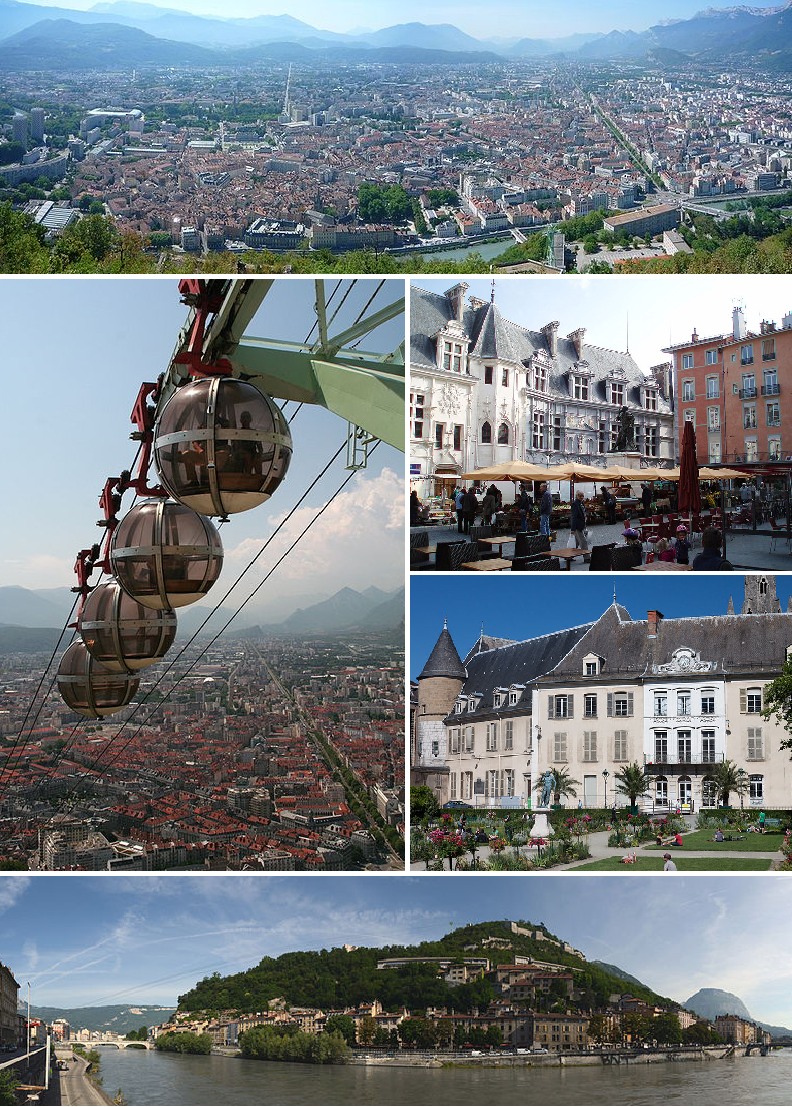
- From upper left: Panorama of the city, Grenoble's cable cars, place Saint-André, jardin de ville, banks of the Isère

- Flag Coat of arms
- Location of Grenoble
- Location within France Location within Auvergne-Rhône-Alpes
- Coordinates: 45°10′18″N 5°43′21″E
- Country: France
- Region: Auvergne-Rhône-Alpes
- Department: Isère
- Arrondissement: Grenoble
- Canton: Grenoble-1, 2, 3 and 4
- Intercommunality: Grenoble-Alpes Métropole

Government
  - Mayor (2026–32): Laurence Ruffin
- Area^{1}: 18.13 km^{2} (7.00 sq mi)
  - Urban (2020): 358.1 km^{2} (138.3 sq mi)
  - Metro (2020): 2,876 km^{2} (1,110 sq mi)
- Elevation: 398 m (1,306 ft)
- Highest elevation: 500 m (1,600 ft)
- Lowest elevation: 212 m (696 ft)
- Population (2023): 156,140
  - Density: 8,612/km^{2} (22,310/sq mi)
  - Urban (2023): 457,409
  - Urban density: 1,277/km^{2} (3,308/sq mi)
  - Metro (2023): 727,380
  - Metro density: 252.9/km^{2} (655.0/sq mi)
- Time zone: UTC+01:00 (CET)
  - Summer (DST): UTC+02:00 (CEST)
- INSEE/Postal code: 38185 /38000, 38100
- ^{1} French Land Register data, which excludes lakes, ponds, glaciers > 1 km^{2} (0.386 sq mi or 247 acres) and river estuaries.

Grenoble (/ɡrəˈnoʊbəl/ grə-NOH-bəl; French: [ɡʁənɔbl]) is the prefecture and largest city of the Isère department in the Auvergne-Rhône-Alpes region of southeastern France. It was the capital of the Dauphiné historical province and lies where the river Drac flows into the Isère at the foot of the French Alps.

The population of the commune of Grenoble was 156,140 as of 2023, while the population of the Grenoble metropolitan area (French: aire d'attraction de Grenoble) was 727,380 in 2023, which makes it the largest metropolis in the Alps, ahead of Innsbruck and Bolzano. A significant European scientific centre, the city advertises itself as the "Capital of the Alps", due to its size and its proximity to the mountains. The many suburban communes that make up the rest of the metropolitan area include four with populations exceeding 20,000: Saint-Martin-d'Hères, Échirolles, Fontaine and Voiron.

Grenoble's history goes back over 2,000 years, to a time when it was a village of the Allobroges Gallic tribe. It became the capital of the Dauphiné in the 11th century. This status, consolidated by the annexation to France, allowed it to develop its economy. Grenoble then became a parliamentary and military city, close to the border with Savoy, which at the time was part of the Holy Roman Empire. Industrial development increased the prominence of Grenoble through several periods of economic expansion over the last three centuries. This started with a booming glove industry in the 18th and 19th centuries, continued with the development of a strong hydropower industry in the late 19th to early 20th centuries, and ended with a post-World War II economic boom symbolized by the holding of the X Olympic Winter Games in 1968.

The city has grown to be one of Europe's most important research, technology and innovation centres, with one in five inhabitants working directly in these fields. Grenoble was classified as a global city with the ranking of "sufficiency" by the Globalization and World Cities Research Network until 2024. The city held the title of European Green Capital in 2022.

== History ==
=== Antiquity ===
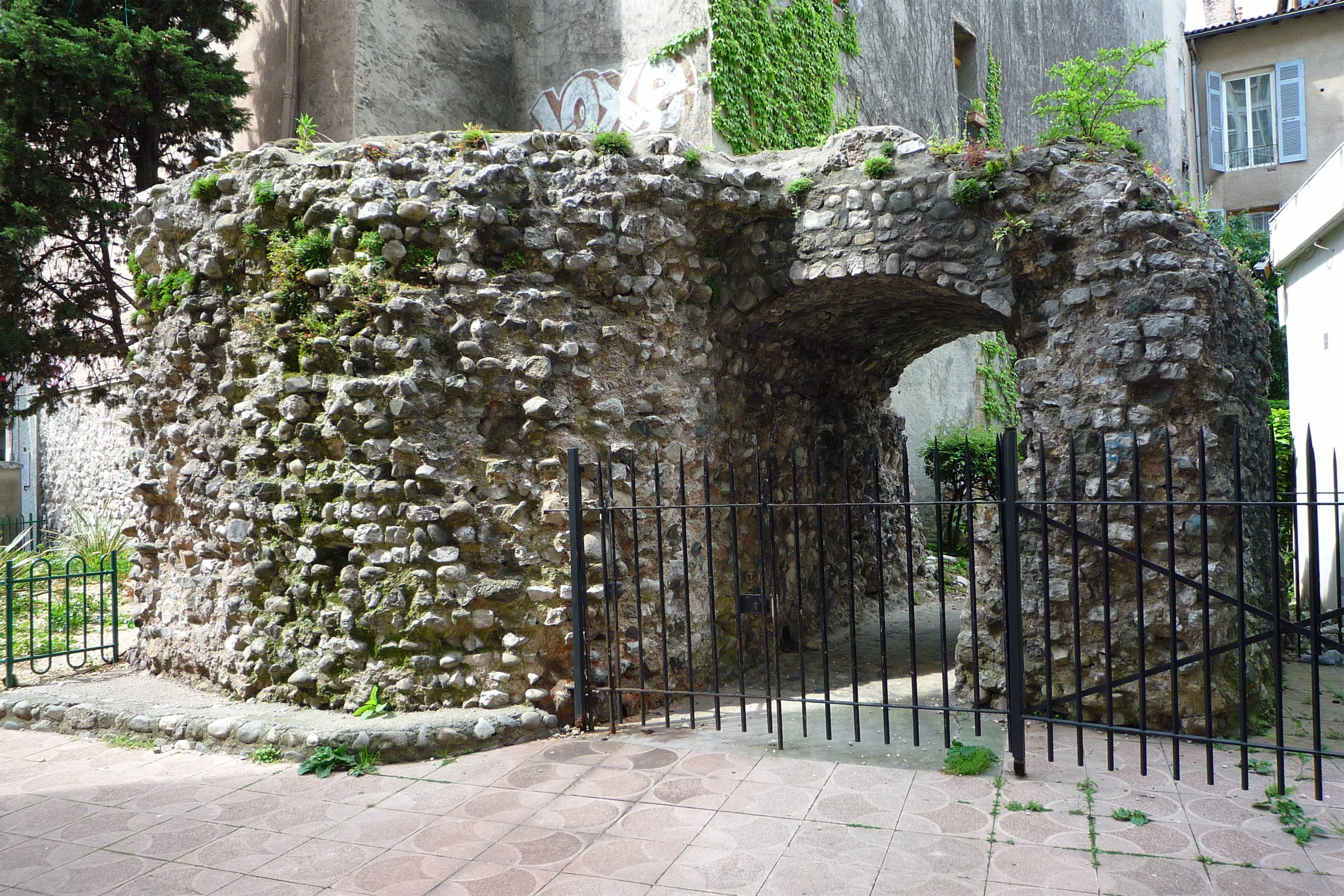
Remnants of the 3rd century AD Roman walls

The first references to what is now Grenoble date back to 43 BC. Cularo was at that time a village of the Allobroges Gallic tribe, near a bridge across the Isère. Three centuries later and with insecurity rising in the late Roman Empire, a strong wall was built around the small town in 286 AD.

The Emperor Gratian visited Cularo and, touched by the people's welcome, made the village a Roman city. In honour of this, Cularo was renamed Gratianopolis ("city of Gratian") in 381. Through regular historical sound shifts, this later became Graignovol during the Middle Ages, and this then became Grenoble.

Christianity spread to the region during the 4th century, and the diocese of Grenoble was founded in 377 AD. From that time on, the bishops exercised significant political power over the city. Until the French Revolution, they styled themselves the "bishops and princes of Grenoble".

=== Middle Ages ===
After the collapse of the Roman Empire, the city became part of the first Burgundian kingdom in the 5th century and of the later Kingdom of Burgundy until 1032, when it was integrated into the Holy Roman Empire. The Burgundian rule was interrupted between 942 and 970 by Arab rule based in Fraxinet.

Grenoble grew significantly in the 11th century when the Counts of Albon chose the city as the capital of their territories. Their possessions at the time were a patchwork of several territories sprawled across the region, and the central position of Grenoble allowed the Counts to strengthen their authority. When they later adopted the title of "Dauphins", Grenoble became the capital of the State of Dauphiné.

Despite their status, the Counts had to share authority over the city with the Bishop of Grenoble. One of the most famous of those was Saint Hugh. Under his rule, the city's bridge was rebuilt, and a regular and leper hospital was built.

Coat of arms of the Dauphiné after becoming a province of France

The inhabitants of Grenoble took advantage of the conflicts between the Counts and the bishops and obtained the recognition of a Charter of Customs that guaranteed their rights. That charter was confirmed by Kings Louis XI in 1447 and Francis I in 1541.

In 1336, the last Dauphin Humbert II founded a court of justice, the Conseil delphinal, which settled at Grenoble in 1340. He also established the University of Grenoble in 1339. Without an heir and deep into debt, Humbert sold his state to France in 1349, on the condition that the heir to the French crown used the title of Dauphin. The first one, the future Charles V, spent nine months in Grenoble. The city remained the capital of the Dauphiné, henceforth a province of France, and the Estates of Dauphiné were created.

The only Dauphin who governed his province was the future Louis XI, whose "reign" lasted from 1447 to 1456. It was only under his rule that Dauphiné properly joined the Kingdom of France. The Old Conseil Delphinal became a Parlement (the third in France after the Parliaments of Paris and Toulouse), strengthening the status of Grenoble as a Provincial capital. He also ordered the construction of the Palais du Parlement (finished under Francis I) and ensured that the Bishop pledged allegiance, thus unifying the political control of the city.

At that time, Grenoble was a crossroads between Vienne, Geneva, Italy, and Savoy. It was the industrial centre of the Dauphiné and the province's biggest city, but a rather small one.

=== Renaissance ===
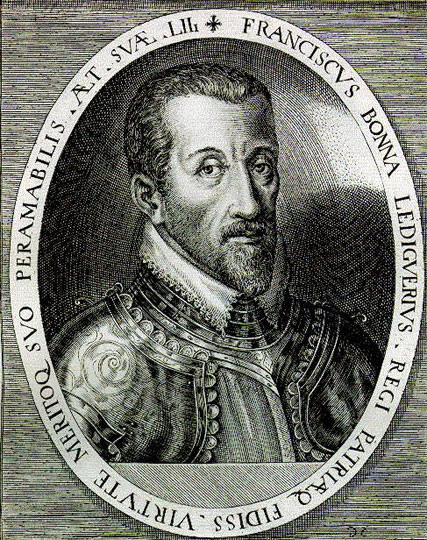
François de Bonne, duc de Lesdiguières

Owing to Grenoble's geographical situation, French troops were garrisoned in the city and its region during the Italian Wars. Charles VIII, Louis XII, and Francis I went several times to Grenoble. Its people consequently had to suffer from the exactions of the soldiers.

The nobility of the region took part in various battles (Marignano, Pavia) and in doing so gained significant prestige. The best-known of its members was Bayard, "the knight without fear and beyond reproach".

Grenoble suffered as a result of the French Wars of Religion. The Dauphiné was indeed an important settlement for Protestants and therefore experienced several conflicts. The baron des Adrets, the leader of the Huguenots, pillaged the Cathedral of Grenoble and destroyed the tombs of the former Dauphins.

In August 1575, Lesdiguières became the new leader of the Protestants and, thanks to the accession of Henry IV to the throne of France, allied himself with the governor and the lieutenant general of the Dauphiné. But this alliance did not bring an end to the conflicts. Indeed, a Catholic movement, the Ligue, which took Grenoble in December 1590, refused to make peace. After months of assaults, Lesdiguières defeated the Ligue and took back Grenoble. He became the leader of the entire province.

Lesdiguières became the lieutenant-general of the Dauphiné and administered the Province from 1591 to 1626. He began the construction of the Bastille to protect the city and ordered the construction of new walls, increasing the city's size. He also constructed the Hôtel Lesdiguières, built new fountains, and dug sewers.

In 1689, the bishop Étienne Le Camus launched the construction of Saint-Louis Church.

=== From Louis XIV to the French Revolution ===
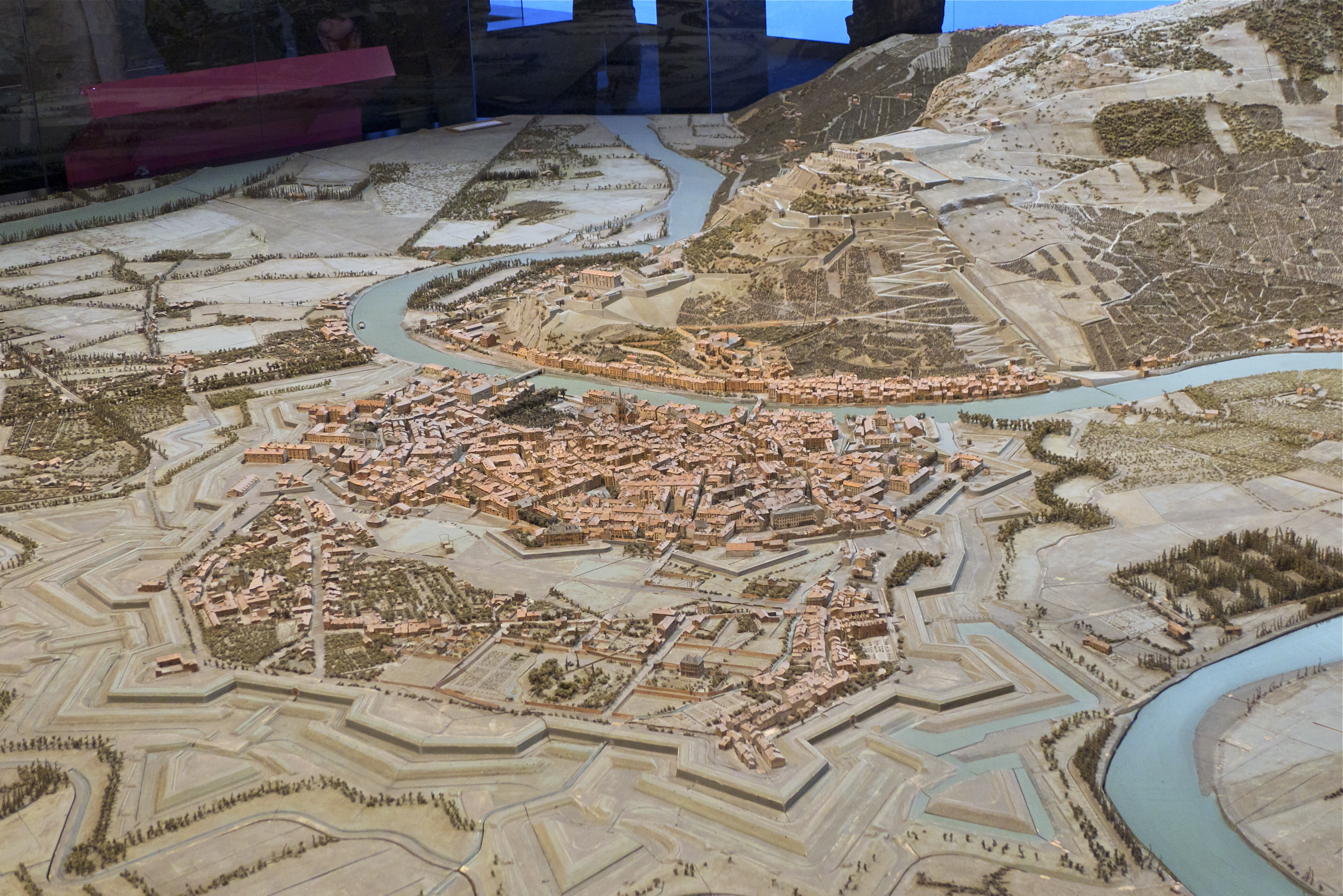
Grenoble plan-relief (1848)

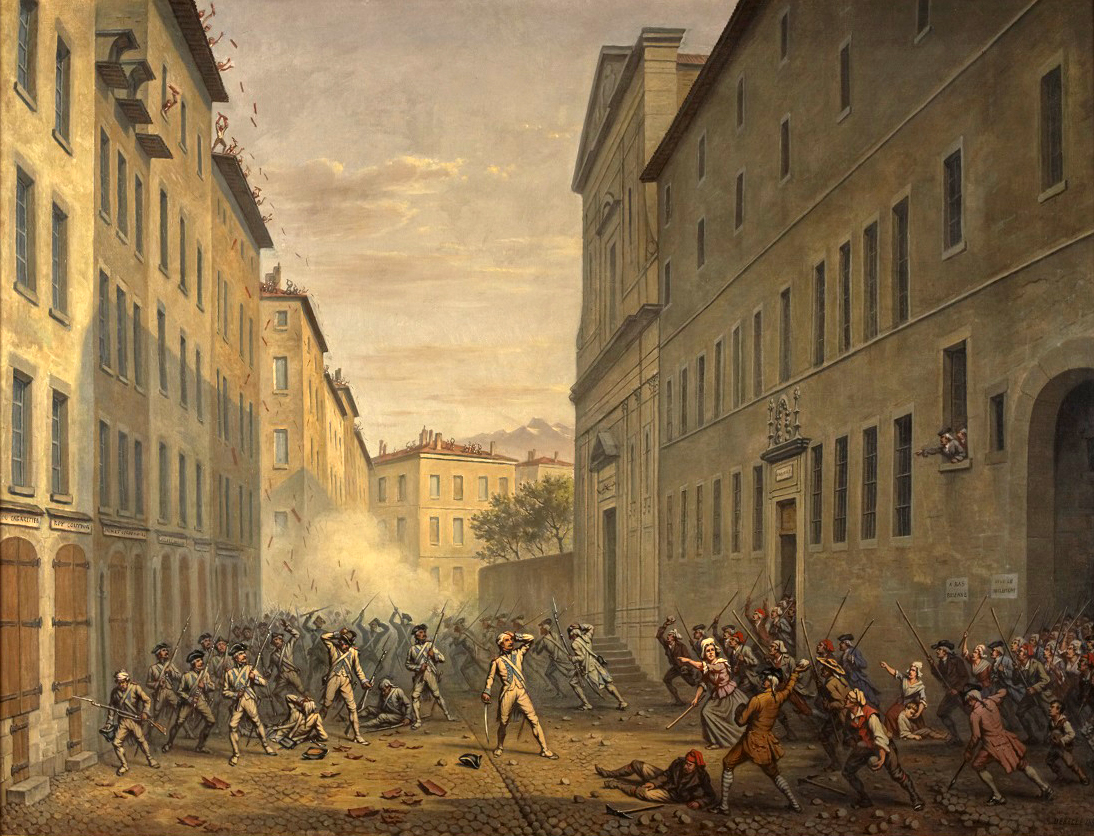
Day of the Tiles, 1890 painting by Alexandre Debelle, (Musée de la Révolution française)

The revocation of the Edict of Nantes by Louis XIV caused the departure of 2,000 Protestants from Grenoble, weakening the city's economy. However, it also weakened the competing glove industry of Grasse, leaving the glove factories of Grenoble without any competition. This allowed a stronger economic development for the city during the 18th century. At the beginning of that century, only 12 glovers made 180,000 gloves each year; by 1787, 64 glovers made 1,920,000 gloves each year.

The city gained some notoriety on 7 June 1788 when the townspeople assaulted troops of Louis XVI in the "Day of the Tiles". The people attacked the royal troops to prevent an expulsion of the notables of the city, which would have seriously endangered the economic prosperity of Grenoble. Following these events, the Assembly of Vizille took place. Its members organized the meeting of the old Estates General, thus beginning the French Revolution. During the Revolution, Grenoble was represented in Paris by two illustrious notables, Jean Joseph Mounier and Antoine Barnave.

In 1790, the Dauphiné was divided into three departments, and Grenoble became the chef-lieu of the Isère department. Only two refractory priests were executed at Grenoble during the Reign of Terror. Pope Pius VI, prisoner of France, spent two days at Grenoble in 1799 before going to Valence where he died at 81 six weeks after his arrival.

=== 19th century ===
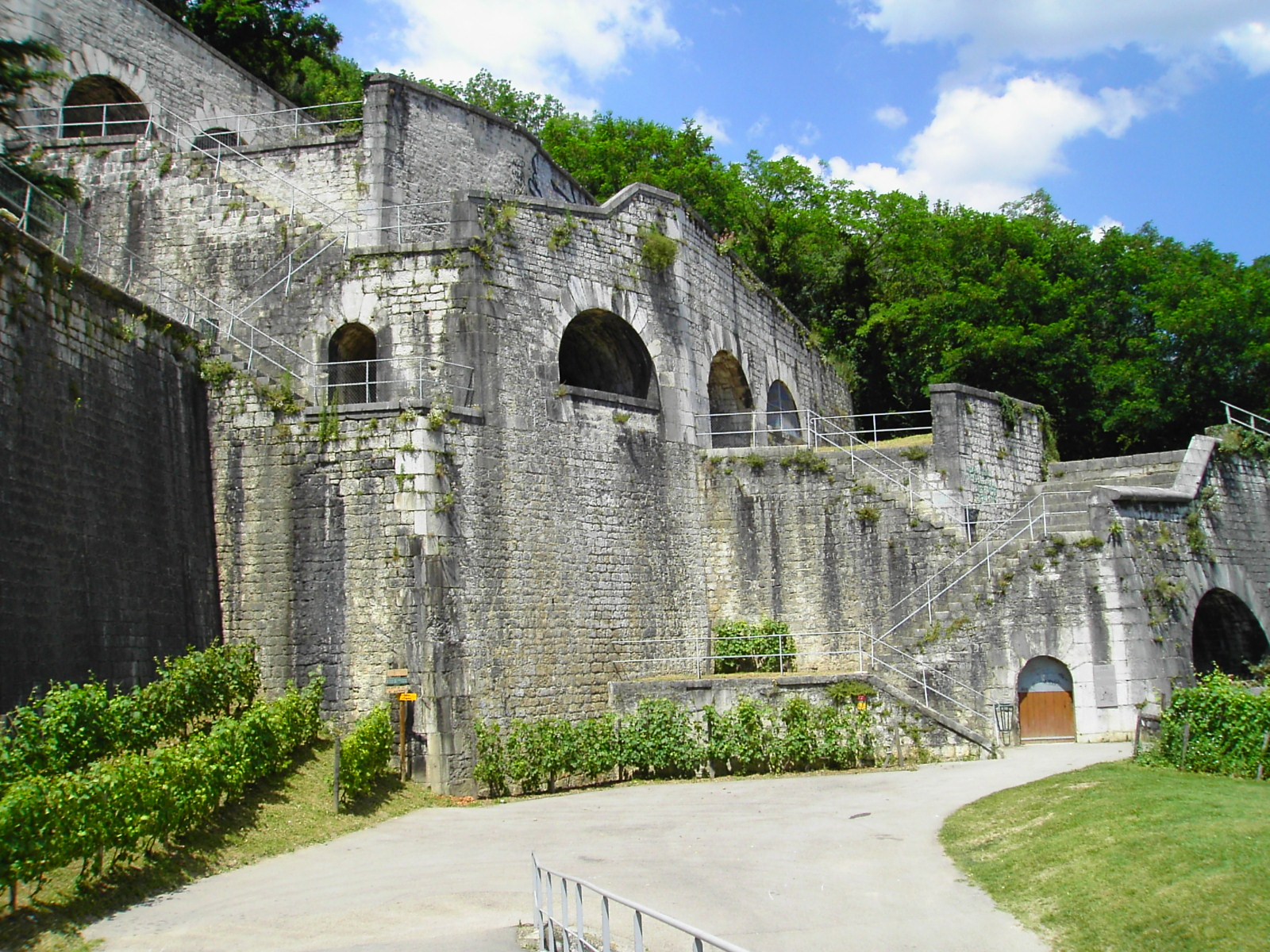
Ramparts close to the Porte Saint Laurent

The establishment of the Empire was overwhelmingly approved (in Isère, the results showed 82,084 yes and only 12 no). Grenoble held for the second time a prisoner Pope in 1809, when Pius VII spent 10 days in the city en route to his exile in Fontainebleau.

In 1813, Grenoble was under threat from the Austrian army, which invaded Switzerland and Savoy. The well-defended city contained the Austrian attacks, and the French army defeated the Austrians, forcing them to withdraw at Geneva. However, the later invasion of France in 1814 resulted in the capitulation of the troops and the occupation of the city.

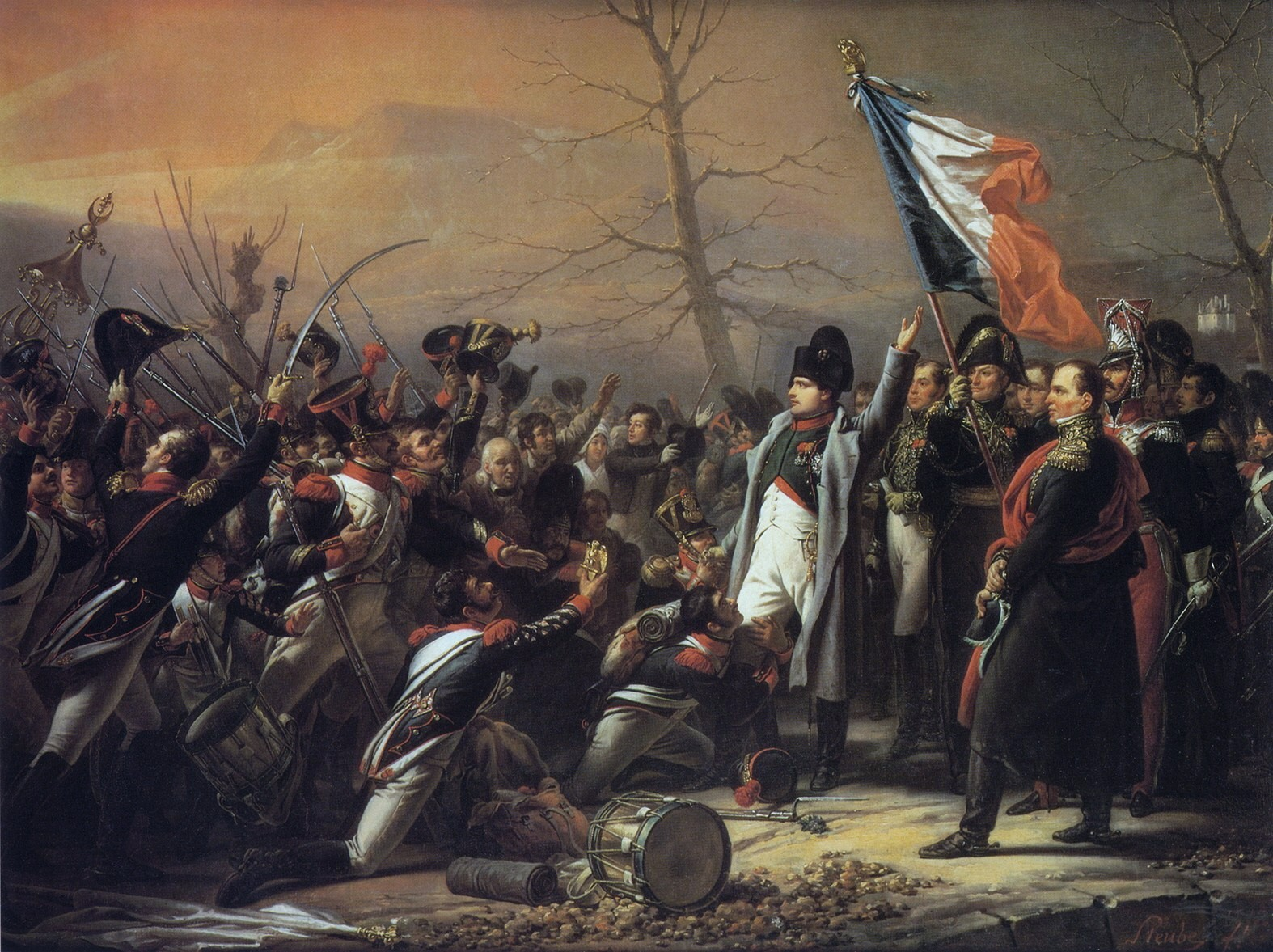
Napoleon's Return from Elba by Charles de Steuben, 1818

During his return from the island of Elba in 1815, Napoleon took a road that led him near Grenoble at Laffrey. There he met the Royalist Régiment d'Angoulême (former 5th) of Louis XVIII's Royal Army. Napoleon stepped toward the soldiers and said these famous words: "If there is among you a soldier who wants to kill his Emperor, here I am." The soldiers all joined his cause. After that, Napoleon was acclaimed at Grenoble and General Jean Gabriel Marchand could not prevent Napoleon from entering the city through the Bonne gate. He said later: "From Cannes to Grenoble, I still was an adventurer; in that last city, I came back a sovereign". But after the defeat of Waterloo, the region suffered from a new invasion of Austrian and Sardinian troops.

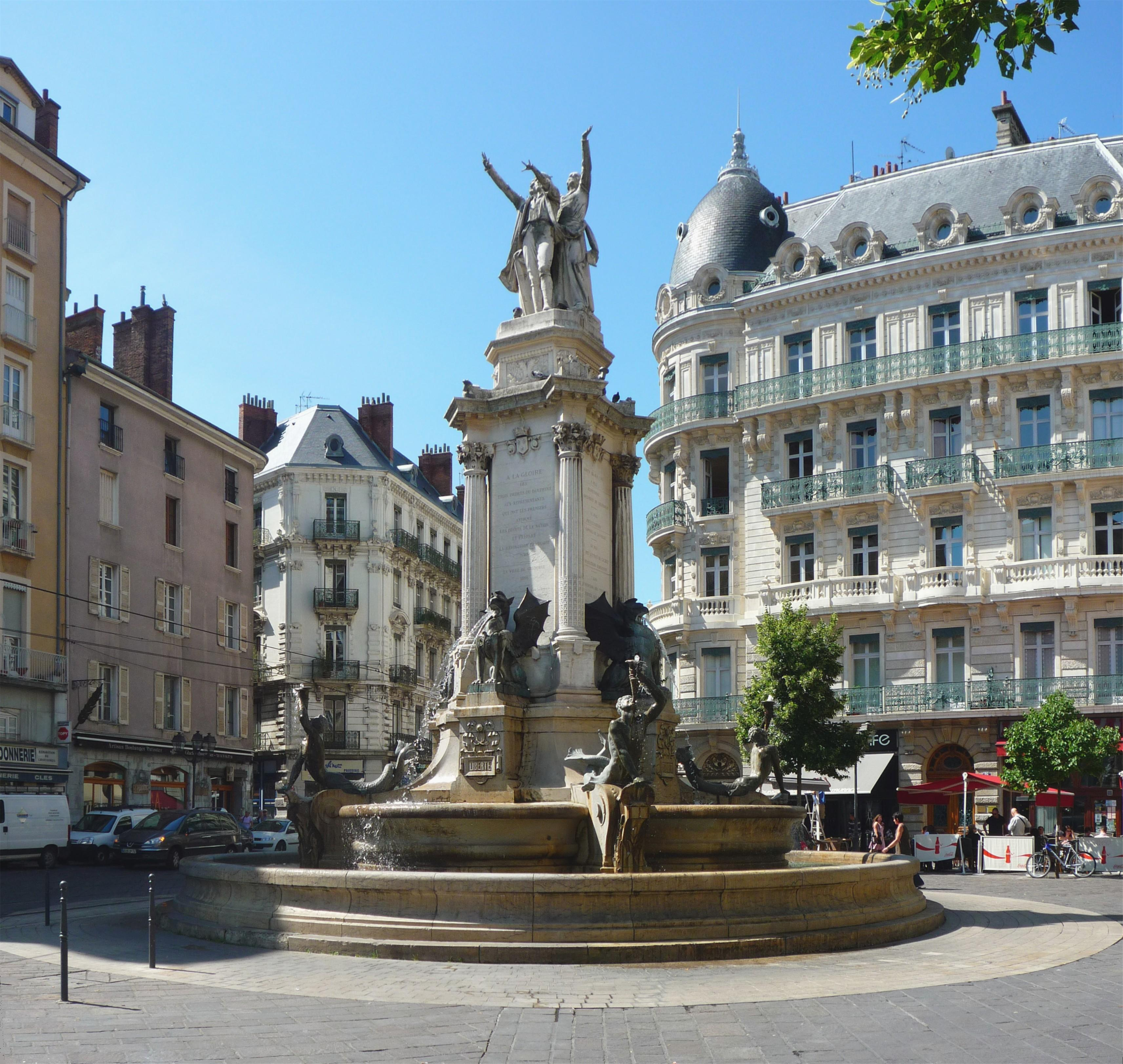
Fountain of the Three Orders (1897)

The 19th century saw significant industrial development of Grenoble. The glove factories reached their Golden Age, and their products were exported to the United States, the United Kingdom, and Russia.

General Haxo transformed the Bastille fortress, which took on its present aspect between 1824 and 1848. The Second Empire saw the construction of the French railway network, and the first trains arrived at Grenoble in 1858. Shortly thereafter Grenoble experienced widespread destruction by extensive flooding in 1859.

In 1869, engineer Aristide Bergès played a major role in industrializing hydroelectricity production. With the development of his paper mills, he accelerated the economic development of the Grésivaudan valley and Grenoble.

On 4 August 1897, a stone and bronze fountain was inaugurated in Grenoble to commemorate the pre-revolutionary events of June 1788. Built by the sculptor Henri Ding, the Fountain of the Three Orders, which represents three characters, is located on Place Notre-Dame. People in Grenoble interpret these characters as follows: "Is it raining?" inquires the third estate; "Please heaven it had rained", lament the clergy; and "It will rain", proclaims the nobility.

=== 20th century ===
World War I accelerated Grenoble's economic development. To sustain the war effort, new hydroelectric industries developed along the various rivers of the region, and several existing companies moved into the armaments industry (for example in Livet-et-Gavet). Electrochemical factories were also established in the area surrounding Grenoble, initially to produce chemical weapons. This development resulted in significant immigration to Grenoble, particularly from Italian workers who settled in the Saint-Laurent neighborhood.

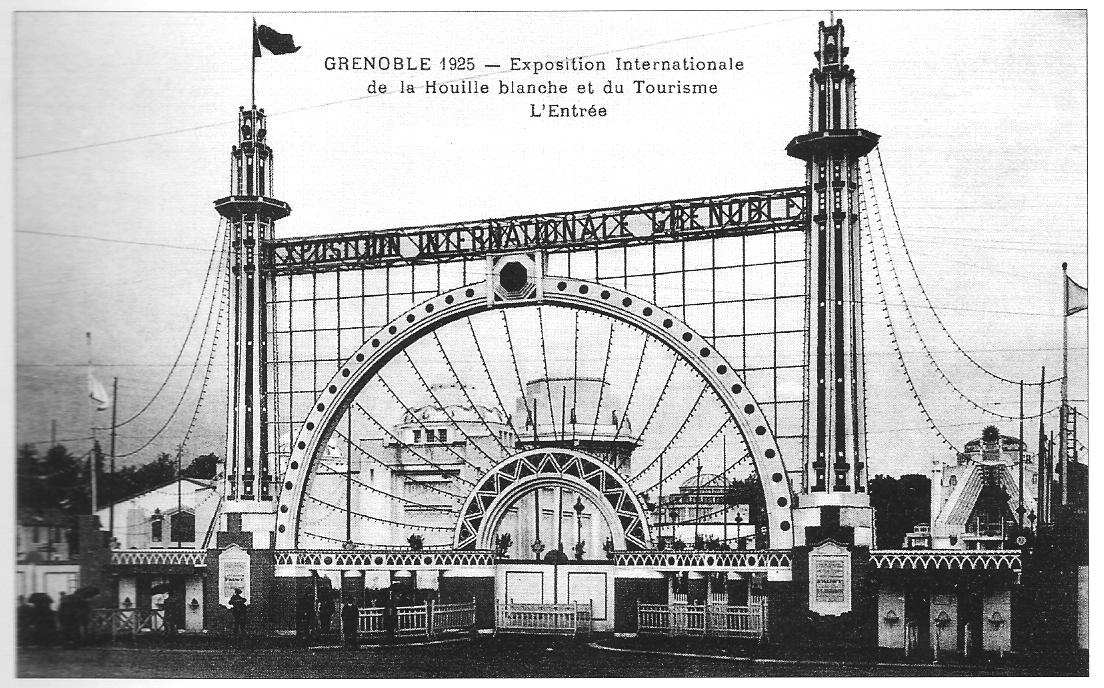
Gate of the exposition in 1925

The economic development of the city was highlighted by the organization of the International Exhibition of Hydropower and Tourism in 1925, which was visited by more than 1 million people. The organization of this exhibition forced the military to remove the old city walls and allowed the expansion of the city to the south. This exhibition also highlighted the city's hydropower industry and the region's tourist attractions.

The site of the exhibition became an urban park in 1926, named Parc Paul Mistral after the death of the mayor in 1932. The only building of this exhibition remaining in the park is the crumbling Tour Perret, which has been closed to the public since 1960 due to its very poor state of maintenance.

==== World War II ====
During World War II, at the Battle of France, the German invasion was stopped near Grenoble at Voreppe by the forces of General Cartier. The French forces resisted until the armistice, after which Grenoble was part of the French State before an Italian occupation from 1942 to 1943. The relative tolerance of the Italian occupiers towards the Jewish populations resulted in a significant number moving to the region from the German-occupied parts of France.

Grenoble was extremely active in the Résistance against the occupation. Its action was symbolized by figures such as Eugène Chavant, Léon Martin, and Marie Reynoard. The University of Grenoble supported the clandestine operations and provided false documentation for young people to prevent them from being assigned to STO.

In September 1943, German troops occupied Grenoble, escalating the conflict with the clandestine movements. On 11 November 1943 (the anniversary of the armistice of 1918), massive strikes and demonstrations took place in front of the local collaboration offices. In response, the occupiers arrested 400 demonstrators in the streets. On 13 November, the resistance blew up the artillery at the Polygon, which was a psychological shock for an enemy who then intensified the repression. On 25 November, the occupiers killed 11 members of the Résistance organizations of Grenoble. This violent crackdown was nicknamed "Grenoble's Saint-Bartholomew". From these events, Grenoble was styled by the Free French Forces the title of Capital of the Maquis on the antennas of the BBC.

This event only intensified the activities of Grenoble's resistance movements. The Germans could not prevent the destruction of their new arsenal on 2 December at the Bonne Barracks. After the Normandy landing, resistance operations reached their peak, with numerous attacks considerably hampering the activity of German troops. With the landing in Provence, German troops evacuated the city on 22 August 1944. On 5 November 1944, General Charles de Gaulle came to Grenoble and bestowed on the city the Compagnon de la Libération to recognise "a heroic city at the peak of the French resistance and combat for the liberation".

==== Post-war ====
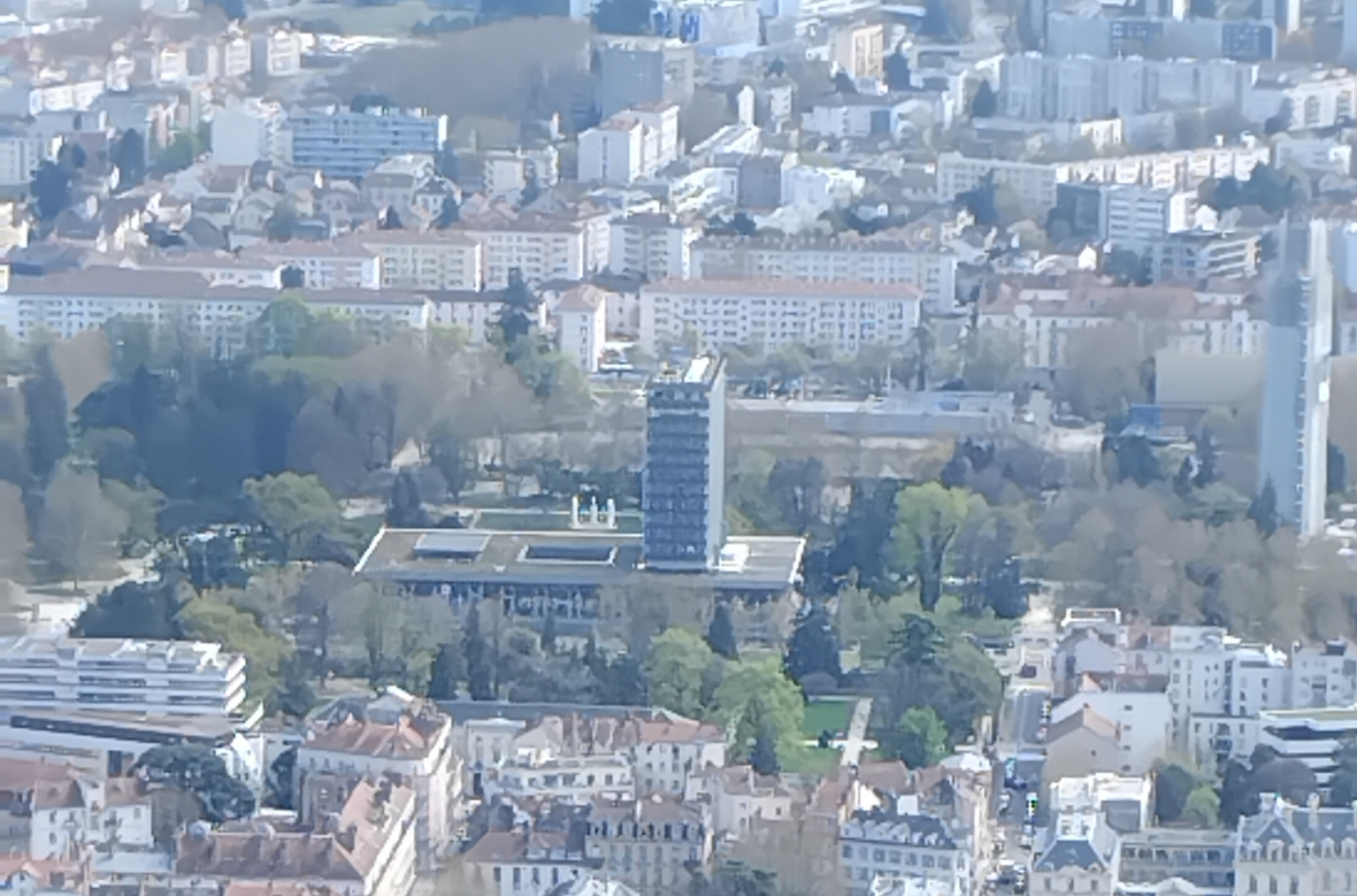
The Hôtel de Ville

In 1955, future physics Nobel Prize laureate Louis Néel created the Grenoble Center for Nuclear Studies (CENG), resulting in the birth of the Grenoble model, a combination of research and industry. The first stone was laid in December 1956.

In 1968, Grenoble hosted the X Olympic Winter Games. This event helped modernize the city with the development of infrastructure such as an airport, motorways, the new Hôtel de Ville (town hall), and a new train station. It also helped the development of ski resorts like Chamrousse, Les Deux Alpes, and Villard-de-Lans.

=== 21st century ===
Since 2017, anarchist movements have been behind a wave of arson attacks in Grenoble. During the last week of August 2023, a police operation was carried out in the Saint-Bruno district of Grenoble, after the city experienced a new series of gangland killings during the summer. Numerous recurring security problems were observed in the immediate vicinity of Place Saint-Bruno and Cours Berriat, particularly related to drug trafficking and arms trafficking.

== Geography ==
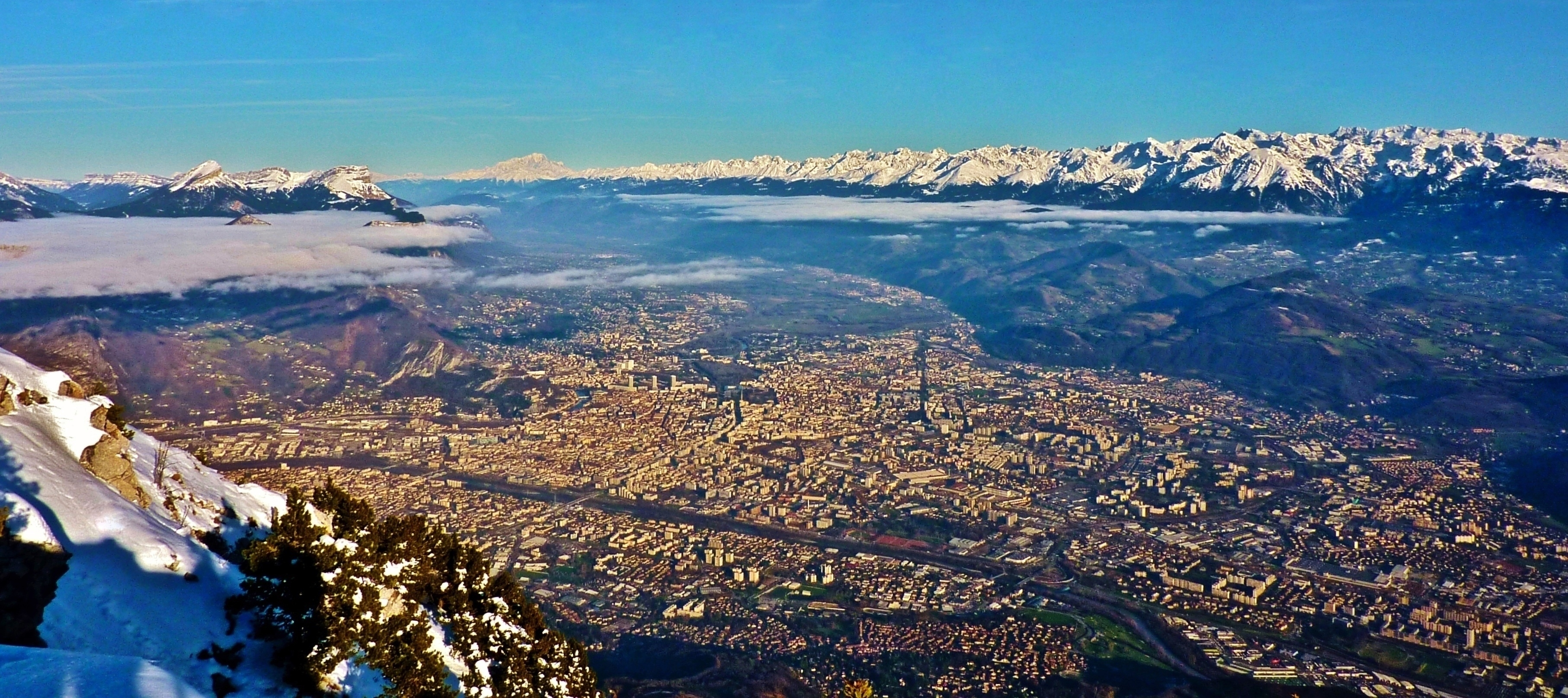
Grenoble with the Dauphiné Alps in the background

Grenoble is surrounded by mountains. To the north lies the Chartreuse, to the south and west the Vercors, and to the east the Belledonne range. Grenoble is regarded as the capital of the French Alps. It is the centre of the Grenoble urban unit (agglomeration).

Except for a few dozen houses on the slopes of the Bastille hill of Chartreuse, Grenoble is exclusively built on the alluvial plain of the rivers Isère and Drac at an altitude of 214 metres (702 ft). As a result, the city itself is extremely flat. Mountain sports are an important tourist attraction in summer and winter. Twenty large and small ski resorts surround the city, the nearest being Le Sappey-en-Chartreuse, which is about 15 minutes away by car.

Historically, Grenoble and the surrounding areas were heavy industry and mining sites. Abandoned mills and factories can be found in small towns and villages, and a few have been converted to tourist attractions, such as the coal mine at La Mure.

=== Climate ===
The climate in Grenoble is much gloomier than in the Mediterranean region, although less so than in Northern France. Rainfall is quite heavy by French standards, although the number of rainy days is relatively moderate. As a result of winter lows averaging below freezing, snowfall also occurs, although the Grenoble Airport area itself is too mild to sustain a snowpack all winter, unlike the surrounding mountains. The record low of −27.1 °C (−16.8 °F) decisively indicates the continental influence, being colder than records in typical maritime climates. Winter nights are also colder than in all other French lowland areas.

Different weather stations report significant variation in climate. Grenoble Airport, located 40 km (25 mi) northwest of the city, has a range from temperate continental climate to oceanic climate (Köppen: Cfb, Trewartha: Dc, Do) depending on the chosen classifications. The area contains significant seasonal differences between warm to hot summers and cool to cold winters. Both temperatures above 30 °C (86 °F) for the summer months and winter air frosts are common.

The Grenoble metropolitan area experiences two different microclimates: one more windy and cold to the west, the other, on the contrary, not very windy and warmer to the east. However, the city of Grenoble features a humid subtropical climate (Köppen: Cfa) with no dry season. Although the record is incomplete, the newer station will meet the humid subtropical classification if maintained for the required 30-year period.

==== Saint-Martin-d'Hères ====
(5 km [3 mi] east of Grenoble at an altitude of 220 m [720 ft])

Climate data for Grenoble – Saint-Martin-d'Hères (2003–2020 averages)
Month	Jan	Feb	Mar	Apr	May	Jun	Jul	Aug	Sep	Oct	Nov	Dec	Year
Record high °C (°F)	20.1 (68.2)	21.9 (71.4)	27.5 (81.5)	31.6 (88.9)	35.4 (95.7)	38.2 (100.8)	40.7 (105.3)	39.4 (102.9)	33.9 (93.0)	31.8 (89.2)	24.6 (76.3)	20.2 (68.4)	40.7 (105.3)
Mean daily maximum °C (°F)	7.0 (44.6)	9.6 (49.3)	14.9 (58.8)	20.0 (68.0)	23.1 (73.6)	27.7 (81.9)	30.5 (86.9)	29.1 (84.4)	24.8 (76.6)	19.2 (66.6)	12.0 (53.6)	7.3 (45.1)	18.8 (65.8)
Daily mean °C (°F)	3.5 (38.3)	4.9 (40.8)	9.2 (48.6)	13.8 (56.8)	17.0 (62.6)	21.3 (70.3)	23.6 (74.5)	22.6 (72.7)	18.9 (66.0)	14.3 (57.7)	8.0 (46.4)	3.9 (39.0)	13.4 (56.1)
Mean daily minimum °C (°F)	−0.1 (31.8)	0.3 (32.5)	3.5 (38.3)	7.6 (45.7)	11.0 (51.8)	14.9 (58.8)	16.8 (62.2)	16.1 (61.0)	13.0 (55.4)	9.3 (48.7)	4.1 (39.4)	0.5 (32.9)	8.1 (46.5)
Record low °C (°F)	−10.7 (12.7)	−12.3 (9.9)	−9.4 (15.1)	−0.8 (30.6)	1.4 (34.5)	5.0 (41.0)	9.4 (48.9)	9.2 (48.6)	4.2 (39.6)	−3.0 (26.6)	−8.9 (16.0)	−10.8 (12.6)	−12.3 (9.9)
Average precipitation mm (inches)	78.8 (3.10)	54.4 (2.14)	71.8 (2.83)	60.5 (2.38)	97.7 (3.85)	82.5 (3.25)	74.1 (2.92)	81.5 (3.21)	62.8 (2.47)	83.6 (3.29)	88.3 (3.48)	87.8 (3.46)	923.8 (36.38)
Source: Infoclimat

==== Alpes-Isère Airport ====
(40 km [25 mi] north-west of Grenoble at an altitude of 400 m [1,300 ft])

Climate data for Grenoble-St Geoirs (1991–2020 normals, extremes 1941–July 2026)
Month	Jan	Feb	Mar	Apr	May	Jun	Jul	Aug	Sep	Oct	Nov	Dec	Year
Record high °C (°F)	18.2 (64.8)	20.7 (69.3)	25.3 (77.5)	28.0 (82.4)	31.4 (88.5)	37.0 (98.6)	38.3 (100.9)	39.5 (103.1)	33.6 (92.5)	29.7 (85.5)	24.8 (76.6)	19.5 (67.1)	39.5 (103.1)
Mean daily maximum °C (°F)	6.3 (43.3)	8.0 (46.4)	12.6 (54.7)	16.2 (61.2)	20.2 (68.4)	24.4 (75.9)	27.1 (80.8)	26.9 (80.4)	22.0 (71.6)	17.0 (62.6)	10.7 (51.3)	6.9 (44.4)	16.5 (61.7)
Daily mean °C (°F)	2.8 (37.0)	3.8 (38.8)	7.4 (45.3)	10.4 (50.7)	14.5 (58.1)	18.4 (65.1)	20.6 (69.1)	20.5 (68.9)	16.4 (61.5)	12.3 (54.1)	6.9 (44.4)	3.5 (38.3)	11.5 (52.7)
Mean daily minimum °C (°F)	−0.7 (30.7)	−0.5 (31.1)	2.1 (35.8)	4.7 (40.5)	8.9 (48.0)	12.4 (54.3)	14.1 (57.4)	14.2 (57.6)	10.8 (51.4)	7.7 (45.9)	3.2 (37.8)	0.1 (32.2)	6.4 (43.5)
Record low °C (°F)	−27.1 (−16.8)	−19.4 (−2.9)	−18.2 (−0.8)	−7.9 (17.8)	−2.8 (27.0)	2.1 (35.8)	4.8 (40.6)	3.8 (38.8)	−1.2 (29.8)	−5.3 (22.5)	−10.9 (12.4)	−20.2 (−4.4)	−27.1 (−16.8)
Average precipitation mm (inches)	63.3 (2.49)	48.7 (1.92)	63.0 (2.48)	75.5 (2.97)	90.7 (3.57)	73.3 (2.89)	66.5 (2.62)	66.3 (2.61)	98.9 (3.89)	106.7 (4.20)	98.6 (3.88)	63.6 (2.50)	915.1 (36.03)
Average precipitation days (≥ 1.0 mm)	8.9	7.6	9.0	9.1	10.1	8.5	7.1	7.2	7.5	9.8	10.0	9.8	104.4
Average snowy days	7.7	6.0	4.5	2.1	0.1	0.0	0.0	0.0	0.0	0.1	2.6	4.9	28.0
Average relative humidity (%)	83	80	76	73	75	74	70	72	79	83	84	84	77.8
Mean monthly sunshine hours	90.8	111.6	172.9	189.8	220.8	258.4	292.4	263.4	199.2	140.4	91.1	78.0	2,108.4
Source 1: Meteo France
Source 2: Infoclimat (humidity, snowy days 1961–1990)

== Population ==
Historical population

Year	Pop.	±% p.a.
1793	20,019	—
1800	20,654	+0.45%
1806	22,129	+1.16%
1821	23,602	+0.43%
1831	24,888	+0.53%
1836	28,969	+3.08%
1841	30,824	+1.25%
1846	27,963	−1.93%
1851	31,340	+2.31%
1856	32,799	+0.91%
1861	34,726	+1.15%
1866	40,489	+3.12%
1872	42,660	+0.87%

Year	Pop.	±% p.a.
1876	45,426	+1.58%
1881	51,371	+2.49%
1886	52,484	+0.43%
1891	60,439	+2.86%
1896	64,002	+1.15%
1901	68,615	+1.40%
1906	73,022	+1.25%
1911	77,438	+1.18%
1921	77,409	−0.00%
1926	85,621	+2.04%
1931	90,748	+1.17%
1936	95,806	+1.09%
1946	102,161	+0.64%

Year	Pop.	±% p.a.
1954	116,440	+1.65%
1962	156,707	+3.78%
1968	161,616	+0.52%
1975	166,037	+0.39%
1982	156,637	−0.83%
1990	150,758	−0.48%
1999	153,317	+0.19%
2007	156,793	+0.28%
2012	158,346	+0.20%
2017	158,454	+0.01%
2023	156,140	−0.24%

Source: EHESS and INSEE

== Urbanism and architecture ==
The Bouchayer-Viallet site is a powerful symbol of Grenoble's industrial past. This former factory is now converted into a dual-purpose area more closely linked to the Berriat neighbourhood. Innovative business activities as Apple Inc. co-exist with housing, sporting facilities, contemporary music venue and arts centres as Le Magasin. At the entrance to the Bouchayer-Viallet site, Square des Fusillés has been redeveloped and extended taking over an old car park, to facilitate access from the tramway stop and Cours Berriat.

Redevelopment of the former De Bonne barracks was an important step in the drive to launch sustainable housing in France. In 2009, the site of De Bonne was distinguished as the best eco-neighborhood in France. A shopping mall contains 53 shops arranged around an inner concourse, with one side opening onto the park and the other connecting to the town.

== Main sights ==
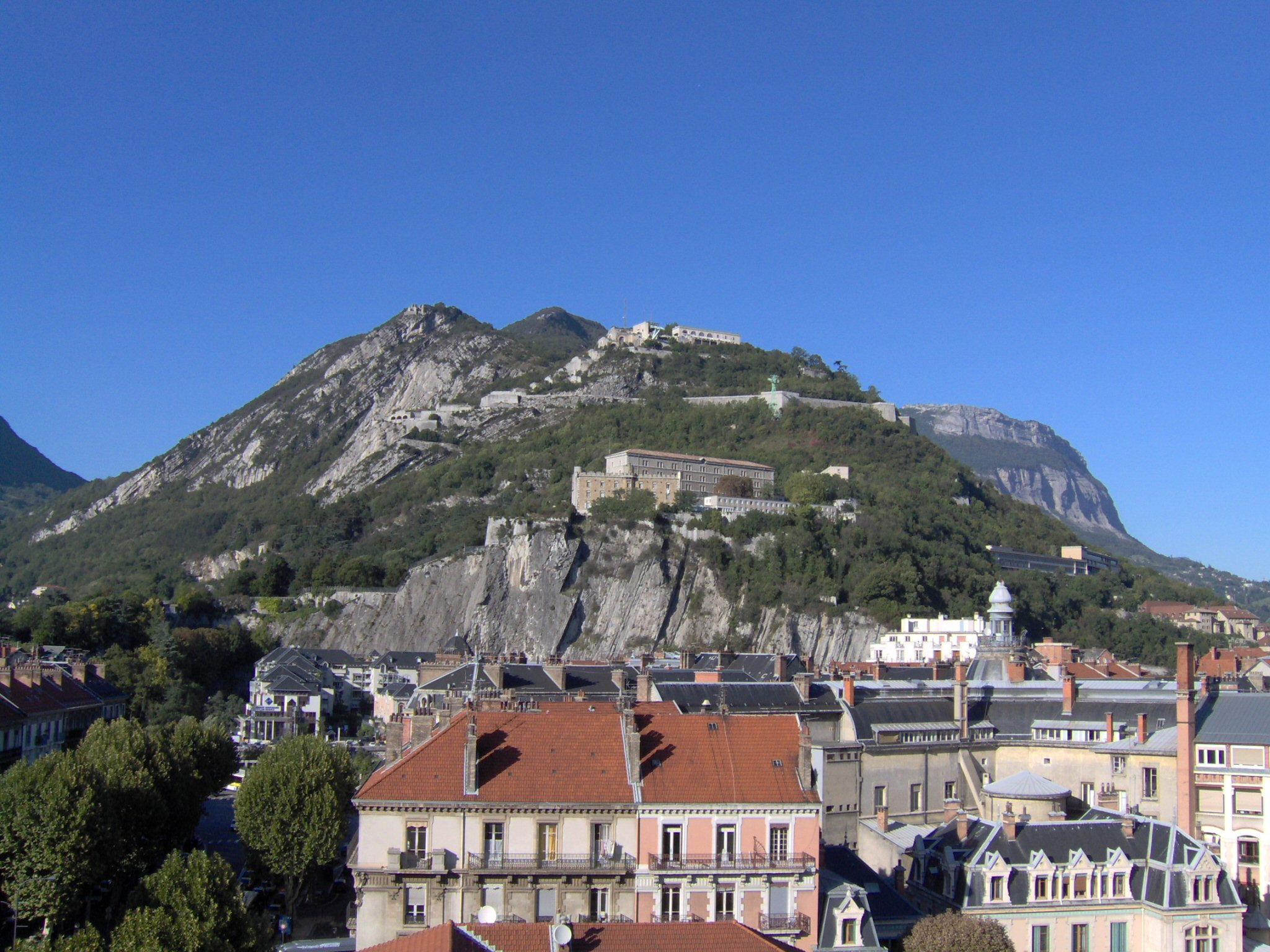
The Bastille from downtown, with the Memorial at the back, on the top of the hill

=== La Bastille ===
The Bastille, an ancient series of fortifications on the mountainside, overlooks Grenoble on the northern side and is visible from many points in the city. The Bastille is one of Grenoble's most visited tourist attractions and provides a good vantage point over both the town below and the surrounding mountains.

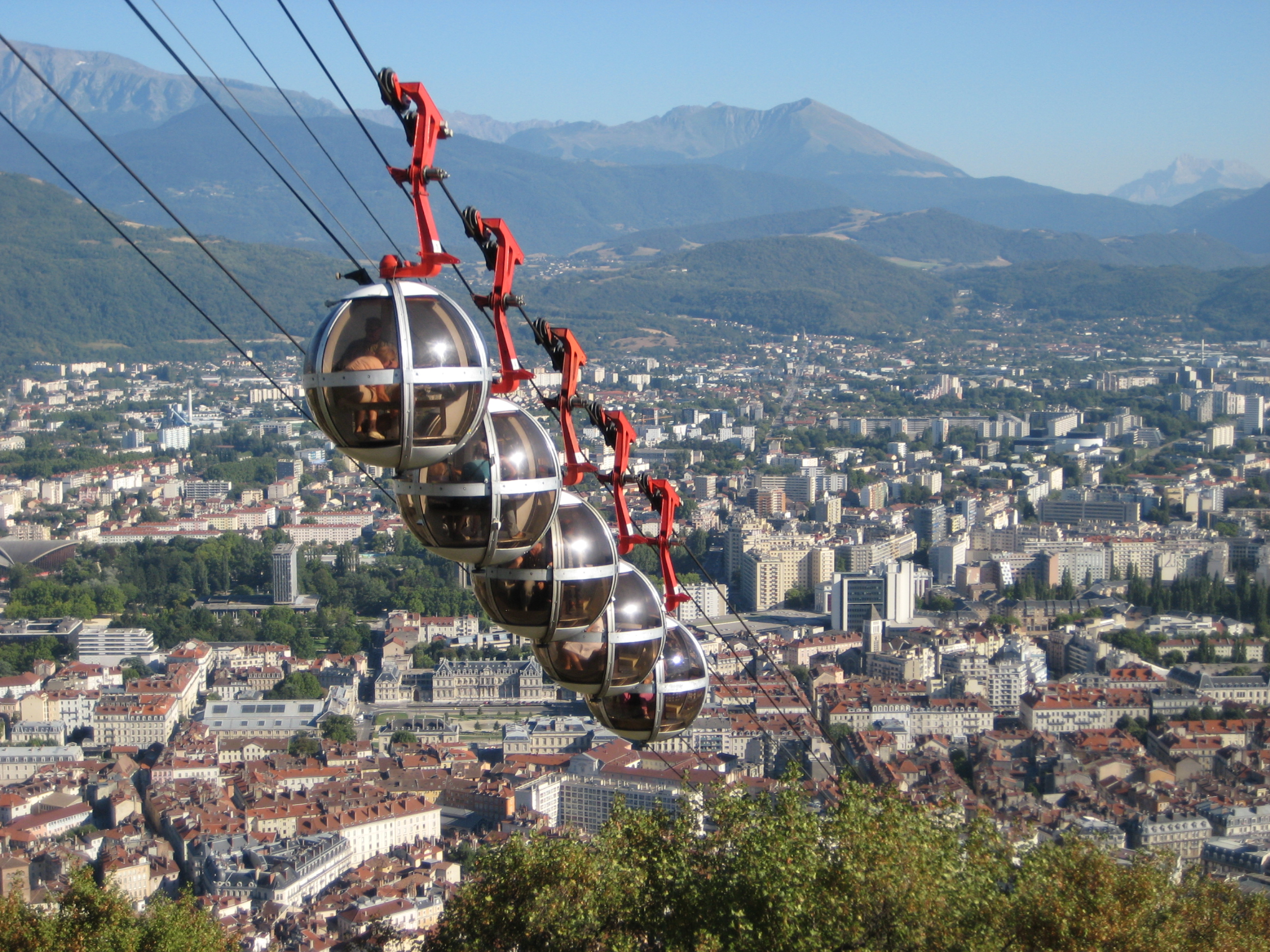
"Les Bulles": the cable cars

The Bastille fort was begun in the Middle Ages, and later centuries saw extensive additions, including a semi-underground defense network. The Bastille has been credited as the most extensive example of early 18th-century fortifications in all of France. It then held an important strategic point on the French Alpine frontier with the Kingdom of Sardinia.

The first cable transport system, installed on the Bastille in 1875, was built by the Porte de France Cement Company for freight. This cable transport system connected a quarry on Mount Jalla, just over the Bastille, and Grenoble. It was abandoned in the early 20th century.

Since 1934, the Bastille has been the destination of the "Grenoble-Bastille cable car". This system of mostly transparent egg-shaped cable cars known to locals as "Les Bulles" (the bubbles) provides the occupants with an excellent view over the Isère. At the top are two restaurants and installed in the casemates of the fort itself since June 2006, the Bastille Art Centre allows visitors to see contemporary art exhibitions. There is also a small military museum on mountain troops (Musée des troupes de montagne) and, since 2000, a memorial to the mountain troops (Mémorial national des troupes de montagne) further along the road, on top of the hill.

=== Palace of the Parliament of Dauphiné ===
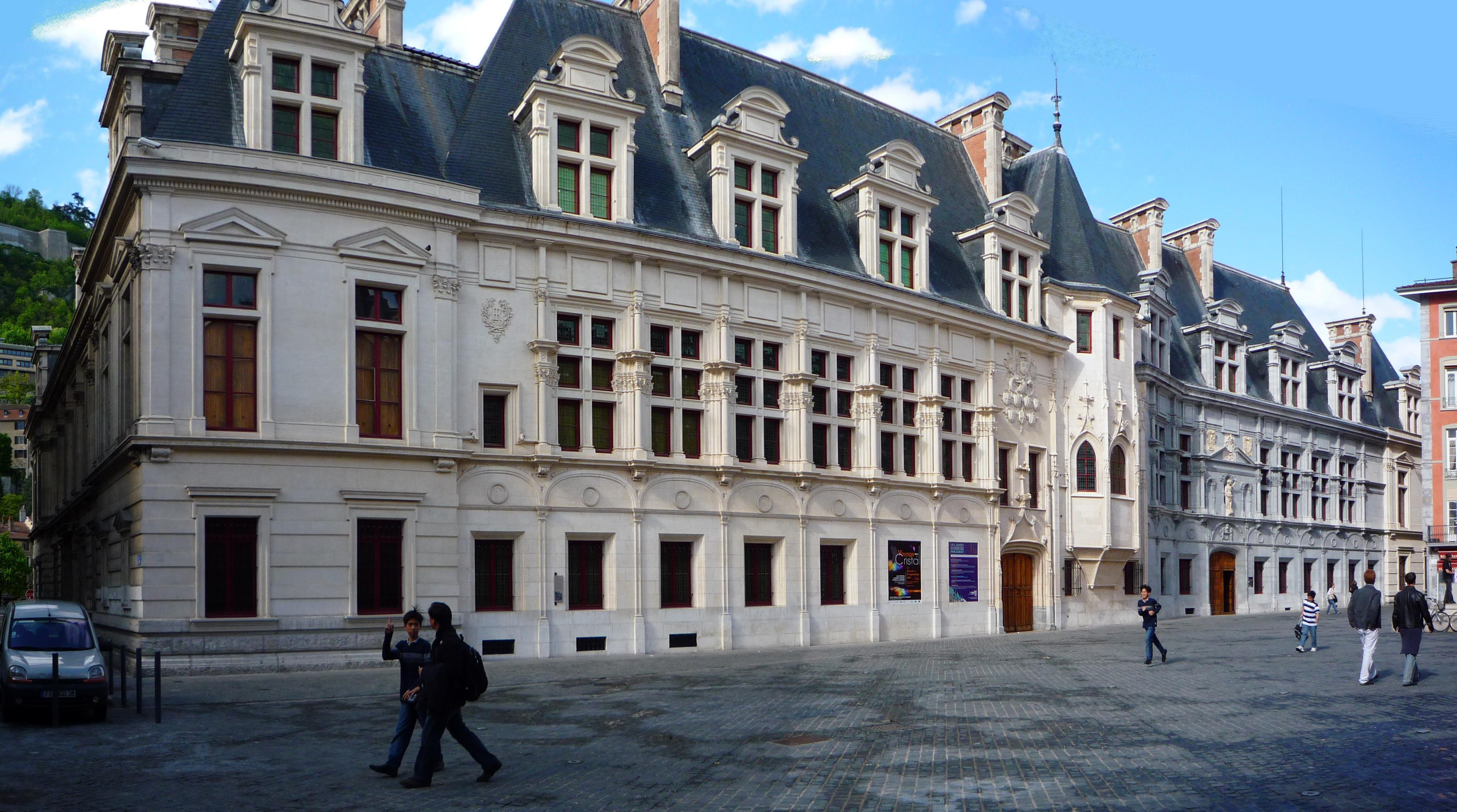
Palace of the Parliament of Dauphiné

This renaissance palace was constructed at the Place Saint André around 1500 and extended in 1539. It was the location of the Parlement of Dauphiné until the French Revolution. It then became the Grenoble courthouse, until the courts were moved to a modern building in 2002. The left wing of the palace was extended in 1897. The front of the former seat of the nearby Dauphiné Parlement combines elements from a gothic chapel and a Renaissance façade.

The building now belongs to the Isère Council (Conseil Général de l'Isère). An ongoing renovation project will give this building a new life whilst preserving its patrimonial character and adding a modern touch.

=== Museum of Grenoble ===
The city's most prized museum, the Museum of Grenoble (Musée de Grenoble), welcomes 200,000 visitors a year. It is primarily renowned for its extensive paintings collection, which covers Western paintings from the Middle Ages to the 21st century. In the early 20th century, the Museum of Grenoble became the first French museum to open its collections to modern art, and its collection of modern and contemporary art has grown to become one of the largest in Europe. The painting holdings include works by painters such as Veronese, Rubens, Zurbarán, Ingres, Delacroix, Renoir, Gauguin, Signac, Monet, Matisse, Picasso, Kandinsky, Joan Miró, Paul Klee, Giorgio de Chirico and Andy Warhol. The museum also presents a few Egyptian antiquities as well as Greek and Roman artifacts. The Sculpture collection features works by Auguste Rodin, Matisse, Alberto Giacometti and Alexander Calder. In April 2010, the prophetess of Antinoe, a 6th-century mummy discovered in 1907 in the Coptic necropolis of Antinoe in Middle Egypt, returned to the Museum of Grenoble, after more than fifty years of absence and extensive restoration.

=== Archaeological museums ===
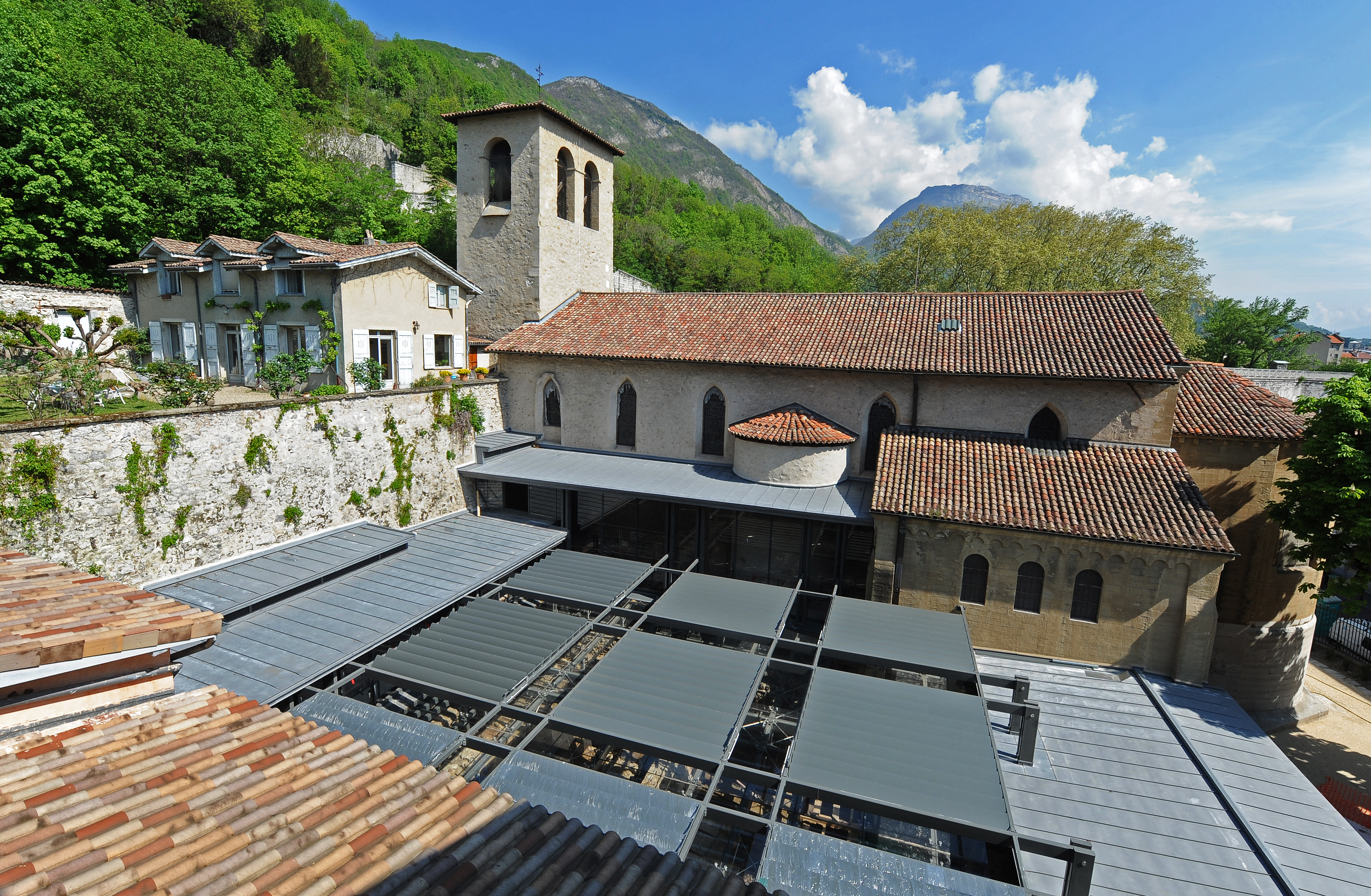
Archaeological museum with the vestiges protected by a new cover of glass and metal (Place Saint-Laurent)

Situated on the right bank of the Isère, on Place Saint-Laurent, the Grenoble Archaeological Museum presents the archaeological excavations done on its location. The vestiges date back to the 3rd century AD and provide a timeline of the history of Christianity in the region. The museum is situated below a 12th-century Benedictine church, under which Jacques Joseph Champollion-Figeac, brother of famed egyptologist Jean-François Champollion, discovered a 6th-century AD church in 1803. It was one of the first classified monuments in France thanks to the intervention of Prosper Mérimée, historic monument inspector. Systematic excavations were conducted from 1978 to 2011, as part of a regional research program on the evolution of churches during the Middle Ages. After eight years of work, the museum reopened on 6 May 2011.

The Musée de l'Ancien Évêché is the second archaeological museum in the city and is located near the Grenoble Cathedral. Installed in 1998, it houses the first baptistery of the city.

The Grenoble town hall hosts a bust of Stendhal by sculptor Pierre Charles Lenoir.

== Education and science ==
=== Secondary level ===
The large community of both foreign students and foreign researchers prompted the creation of an international school. The Cité Scolaire Internationale Europole (CSI Europole) was formerly housed within the Lycée Stendhal across from the Maison du Tourisme, but later moved to its own building in the Europole district. In the centre of the city, two high schools have provided education to the isérois for more than three centuries. The oldest one, the Lycée Stendhal, was founded in 1651 as a Jesuit College. An astronomical and astrological sundial created in the college's main building in 1673 can still be visited today. The second-oldest higher education establishment in Grenoble is the Lycée Champollion, completed in 1887 to offer an excellent education to both high school students and students of preparatory classes.

=== Higher education ===
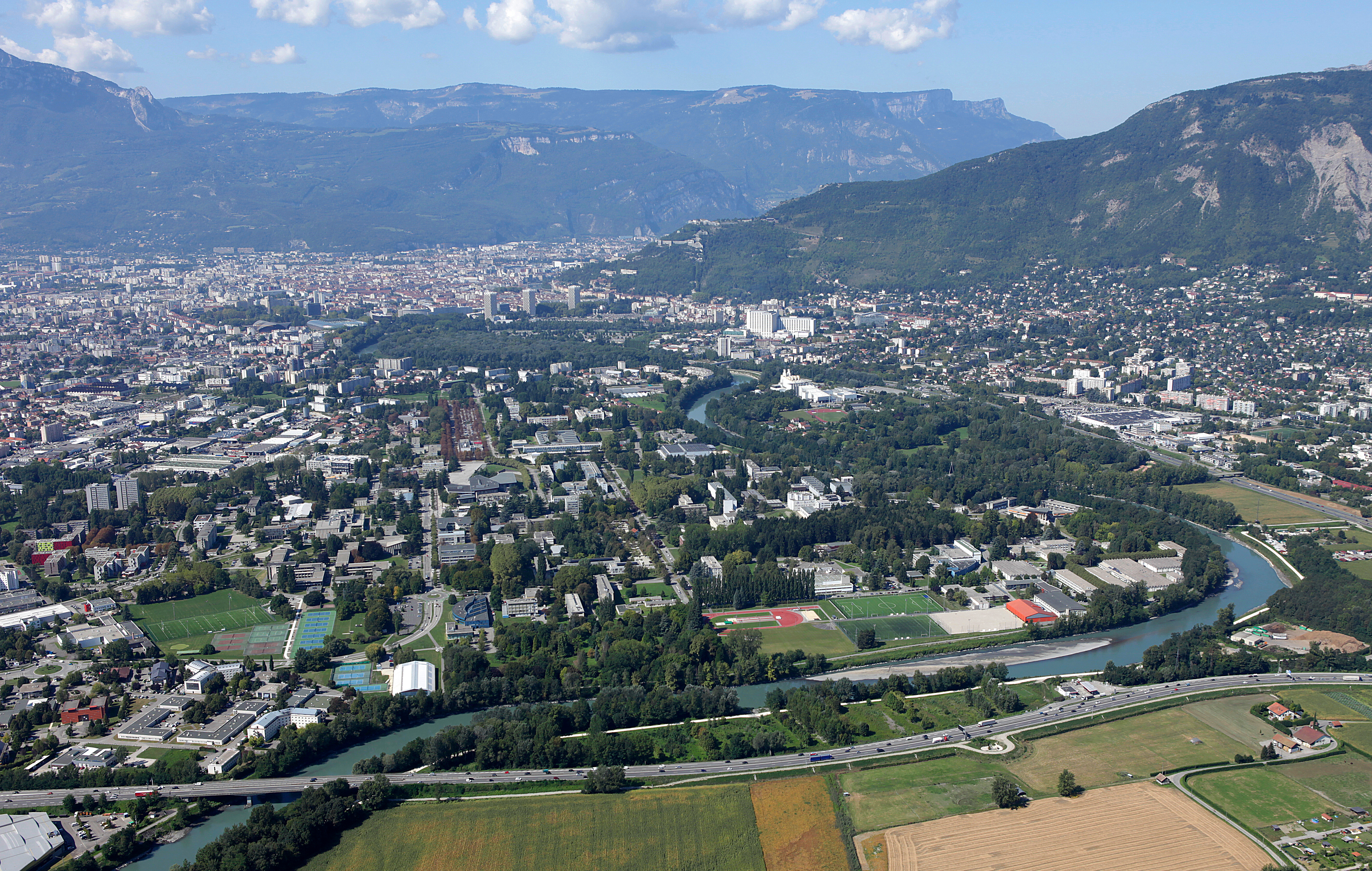
Campus of the Université Grenoble Alpes

The city is an important university centre with over 54,000 students in 2013, of whom 16% arrive from abroad.

In a 1339 papal bull, Pope Benedict XII commissioned the establishment of the University of Grenoble.

In 1965, the university mostly relocated from downtown to a suburban main campus outside of the city in Saint Martin d'Hères (with some parts in Gières). However, smaller campuses remain both downtown and in the northwestern part of the city known as the Polygone Scientifique ("Scientific Polygon").

From 1970 to 2015, the university was divided into four separate institutions sharing the campus grounds, some buildings and laboratories, and even part of their administration:

- Grenoble I – Joseph Fourier University (sciences, health, technologies)
- Grenoble II – Pierre Mendès-France University (social sciences)
  - which includes the Institute of political studies
- Grenoble III – Stendhal University (humanities)
- Grenoble Institute of Technology (INPG or Grenoble-INP) is a federation of engineering colleges.

The first three of those merged back on 1 January 2016 to form the Université Grenoble Alpes, and the last one joined them on 1 January 2020.

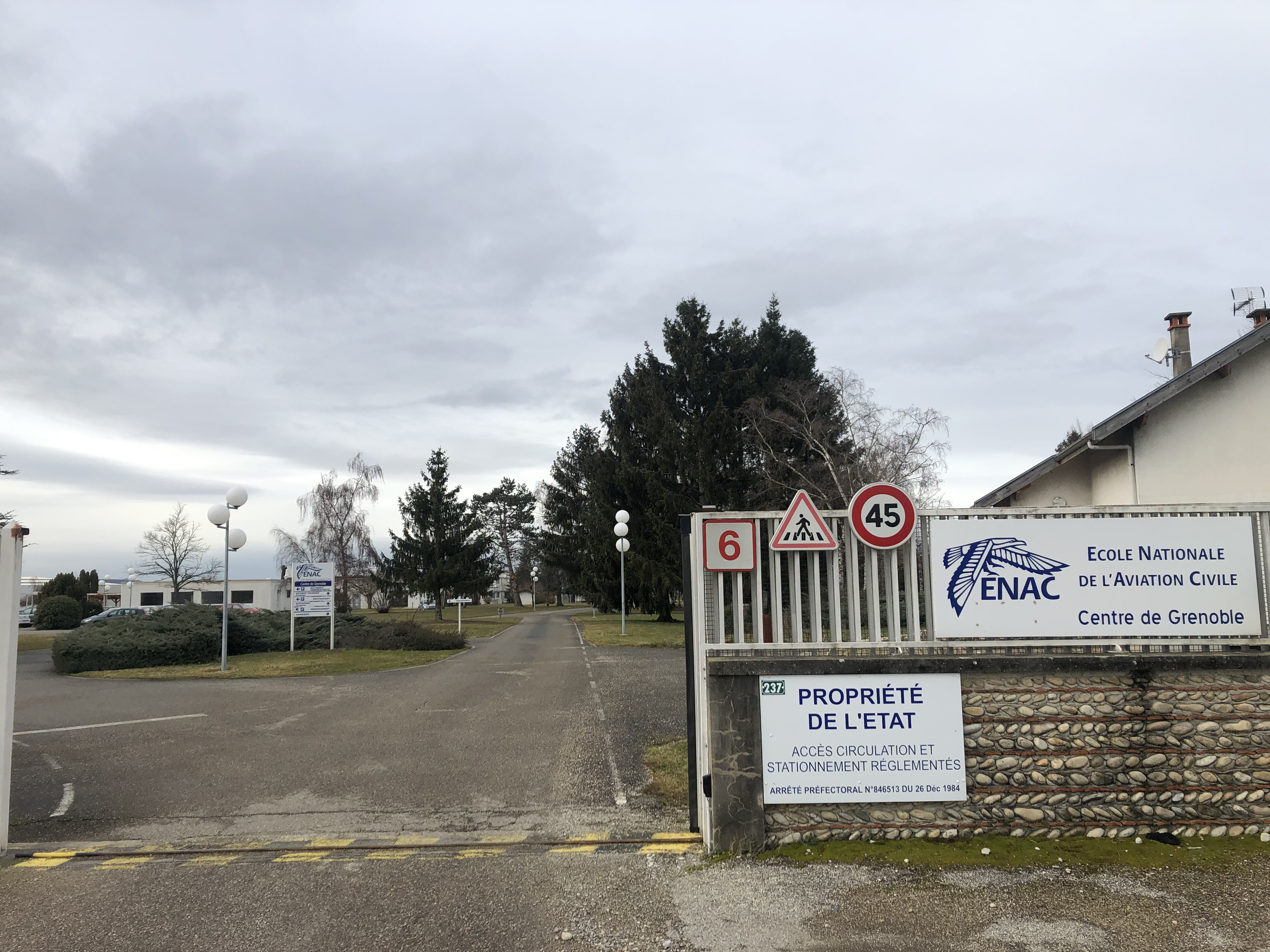
Grenoble Campus of the ENAC

Campuses are also located in Grenoble for:

- École nationale de l'aviation civile (French civil aviation university),
- École d'Architecture de Grenoble (School of Architecture of Grenoble) and
- Grenoble École de Management (Grenoble School of Management) triple accredited AMBA-EQUIS-AACSB Business School.

==== Science and engineering ====
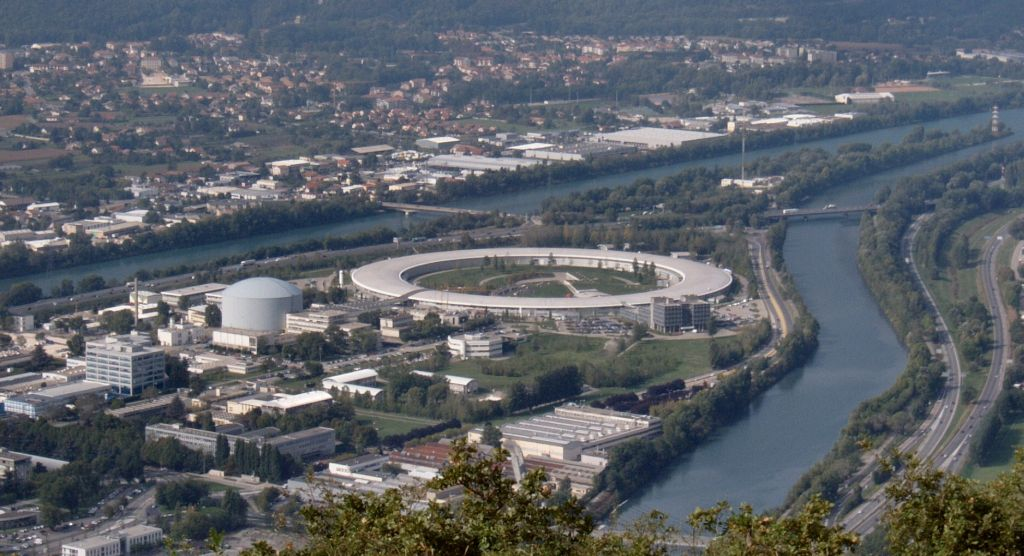
Site of European Synchrotron Radiation Facility, Institut Laue-Langevin and European Molecular Biology Laboratory at the western end of the Polygone Scientifique

Grenoble is a major scientific centre, especially in the fields of physics, computer science, and applied mathematics: Universite Joseph Fourier (UJF) is one of the leading French scientific universities while the Grenoble Institute of Technology trains more than 5,000 engineers every year in key technology disciplines. Grenoble's high-tech expertise is organized mainly around three domains: information technology, biotechnologies, and new technologies of energy.

Many fundamental and applied scientific research laboratories are conjointly managed by Joseph Fourier University, Grenoble Institute of Technology, and the French National Centre for Scientific Research (CNRS). Numerous other scientific laboratories are managed independently or in collaboration with the CNRS and the French National Institute for Research in Computer Science and Control (INRIA).

Other research centres in or near Grenoble include the European Synchrotron Radiation Facility (ESRF), the Institut Laue-Langevin (ILL), the European Molecular Biology Laboratory (EMBL), the Institut de radioastronomie millimétrique, one of the main research facilities of the Commissariat à l'Énergie Atomique (Nuclear Energy Commission, CEA), the LNCMI and the European branch of Xerox Research (whose most notable center was PARC). Leti and the recent development of Minatec, a centre for innovation in micro- and nano-technology, only increases Grenoble's position as a European scientific centre. Biotechnologies are also well represented in the Grenoble region with the molecular biology research center BioMérieux, the Clinatec center, the regional center NanoBio and many ramifications of the global competitiveness cluster Lyonbiopôle.

Meanwhile, Grenoble has large laboratories related to space and to the understanding and observation of the universe as the Institut de radioastronomie millimétrique, the Institut de planétologie et d'astrophysique de Grenoble, the Laboratoire de physique subatomique et de cosmologie de Grenoble, the Institut Néel but also to a lesser extent the Institut des sciences de la Terre (part of the Observatoire des Sciences de l'Univers de Grenoble).

Local institutions and research organizations have united to create the GIANT (Grenoble Innovation for Advanced New Technologies) Campus with the aim at becoming a top campus in research (CEA, CNRS), higher education (INP-UGA, Grenoble Ecole de Management), and high tech.

The city benefits from the highest concentration of strategic jobs in France after Paris, with 14% of the employments, 35,186 jobs, 45% of which specialized in design and research. Grenoble is also the largest research center in France after Paris with 22,800 jobs (11,800 in public research, 7,500 in private research and 3,500 PhD students).

Grenoble has academic research in humanities and political sciences. Its universities, alongside public scientific institutions, host some of the largest research centres in France (in fields such as political science, urban planning or the sociology of organizations).

=== Knowledge and innovation community ===
Grenoble is one of the co-location centres of the European Institute of Innovation and Technology's Knowledge and Innovation Communities for sustainable energy.

== Economy ==
Industry occupies a large part of the local economy. High-tech industries have a significant presence, especially in the field of semiconductors, electronics, and biotechnology. STMicroelectronics, Schneider Electric and Soitec have major manufacturing and R&D facilities. Traditional industries in fields such as heavy equipment manufacturing and chemistry are still present and include Caterpillar, GE Renewable Energy, and Arkema.

The town was once famous for glove manufacturing, for which Xavier Jouvin introduced an innovative technique in the 19th century. A few small companies continue to produce gloves for a very high-end market.

=== Companies ===
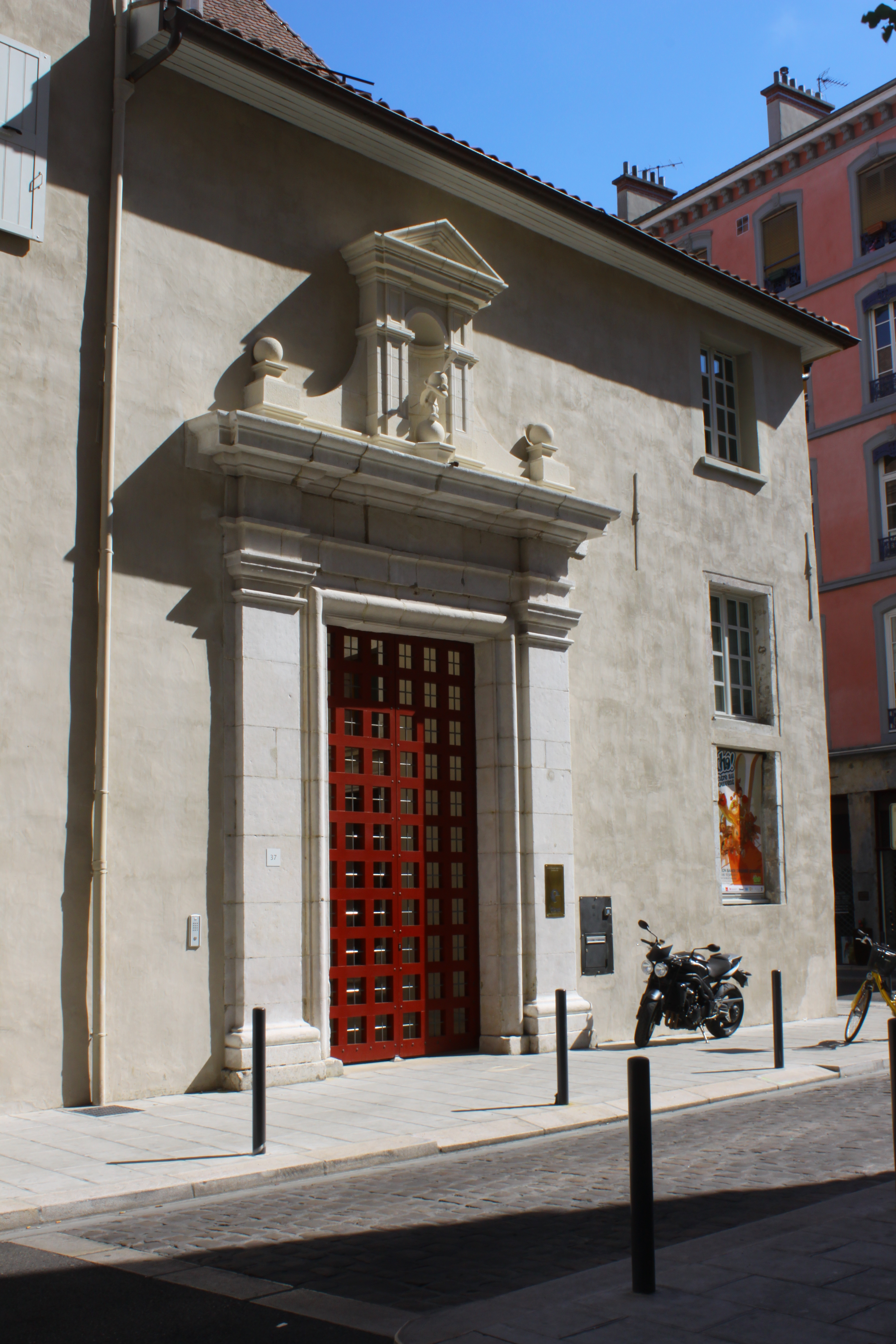
Head office of Glénat

In 2011, the largest employers in the Grenoble metropolitan area were:

Enterprise, location	Number of employees	Sector
STMicroelectronics, Grenoble and Crolles	5,979	Semiconductor manufacturing, R&D
Schneider Electric, Grenoble agglomeration	4,915	Electrical equipment, R&D
Caterpillar France, Grenoble and Echirolles	1,865	Construction of heavy equipment
Hewlett-Packard France, Eybens	1,814	Computer science
Becton Dickinson, Pont-de-Claix	1,736	R&D and production of advanced systems for drugs administration
Carrefour, Grenoble agglomeration	1,165	Hypermarkets
Capgemini, Grenoble	1,100	Information technology consulting and IT service management
Groupe Casino, Grenoble agglomeration	990	Supermarkets
Samse, Grenoble agglomeration	965	Supplier of building materials
Soitec, Bernin	952	Semiconductor manufacturer specialized in the production of SOI wafers

The presence of companies such as HP or Caterpillar in the area has drawn many American and British workers to Grenoble, especially in the surrounding mountain villages. The region has the second largest English-speaking community in France, after Paris. That community has an English-speaking Church and supports the International School. Many of these Americans, British, Australians etc. go to Grenoble with the intention of returning home after some time but the mountains and general lifestyle often keep them there. Some choose to put their children in the international school "cité internationale", while the "American School of Grenoble" is the alternative for those who prefer to have the core curriculum in English. With numerous associations like Open House, this large English-speaking population organizes family events making life in Grenoble harder to turn away from.

Publisher Glénat has its head office in Grenoble. Inovallée is a science park with about 12,000 jobs located at Meylan and Montbonnot-Saint-Martin near Grenoble.

=== Media ===
téléGrenoble Isère is the local TV channel with France 3 Alpes. The local newspaper is Le Dauphiné libéré.

== Sport ==
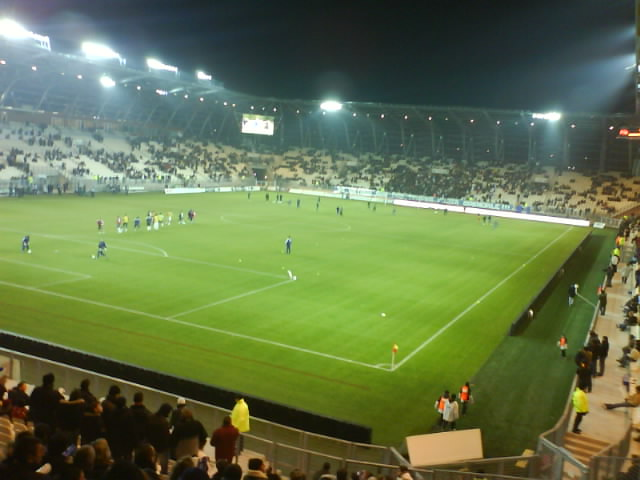
Stade des Alpes

Grenoble hosted the 1968 Winter Olympics. The city is surrounded by ski resorts nestled in the surrounding mountains. Stade Lesdiguières is located in Grenoble and has been the venue for international rugby league and rugby union games.

Grenoble is the home of first rugby union, FC Grenoble, and ice hockey teams, Brûleurs de loups, and a second-tier football team, Grenoble Foot 38.

- Six-Days of Grenoble, a six-day track cycling race held since 1971
- The via ferrata Grenoble is a climbing route located on the hill of the Bastille in Grenoble.

The abundance of natural sites around Grenoble as well as the particular influence of mountaineering practices and history make many Grenoble inhabitants very fond of sports and outdoor activities (e.g., hiking, mountain biking, backcountry skiing, rock climbing, and paragliding). The Tour de France cycling race regularly passes through the city.

== Transport ==
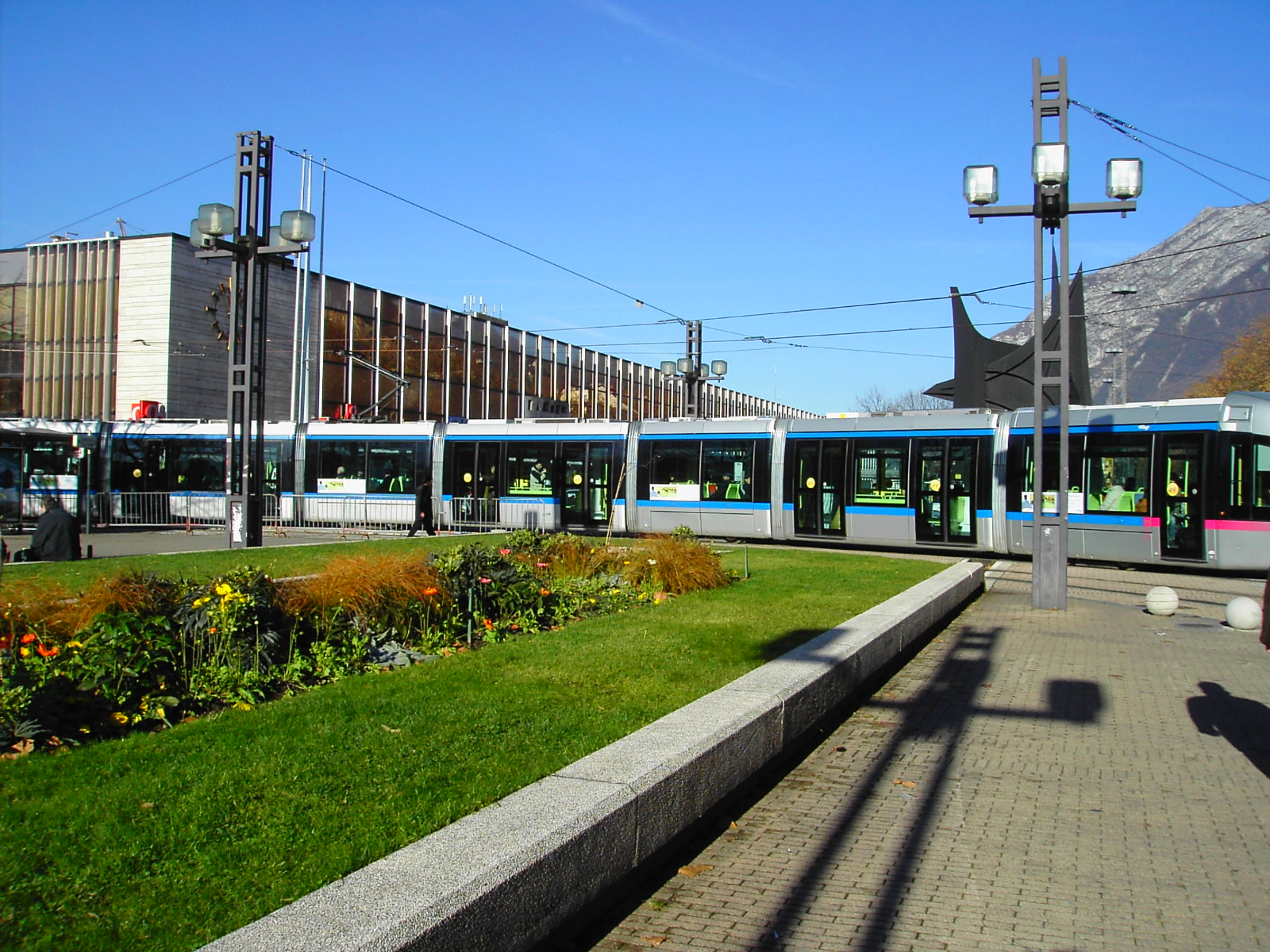
The railway station and a tram (light rail)

A comprehensive bus and tram service operates 26 bus routes and five tram lines. It serves much of greater Grenoble, while a new cable car system known as the Métrocâble is considered for construction. Being essentially flat, Grenoble is also a bicycle-friendly city.

The Gare de Grenoble is served by the TGV rail network, with frequent high-speed services to and from Paris-Gare de Lyon, taking 3 hours, usually with a stop at Lyon Saint-Exupéry Airport. While Grenoble is not directly on any high-speed line, TGVs can run at reduced speeds on the classic network and enable such connections. Local rail services connect Grenoble with Lyon, and less frequently to Geneva, to Valence, and to destinations to the south. Valence and Lyon to the west provides connections with TGV services along the Rhône Valley. Rail and road connections to the south are less developed.

Grenoble can be accessed by air from Grenoble-Isère Airport, Lyon Saint-Exupéry Airport and Geneva International Airport, with the airport bus connections being most frequent to Lyon Saint-Exupéry.

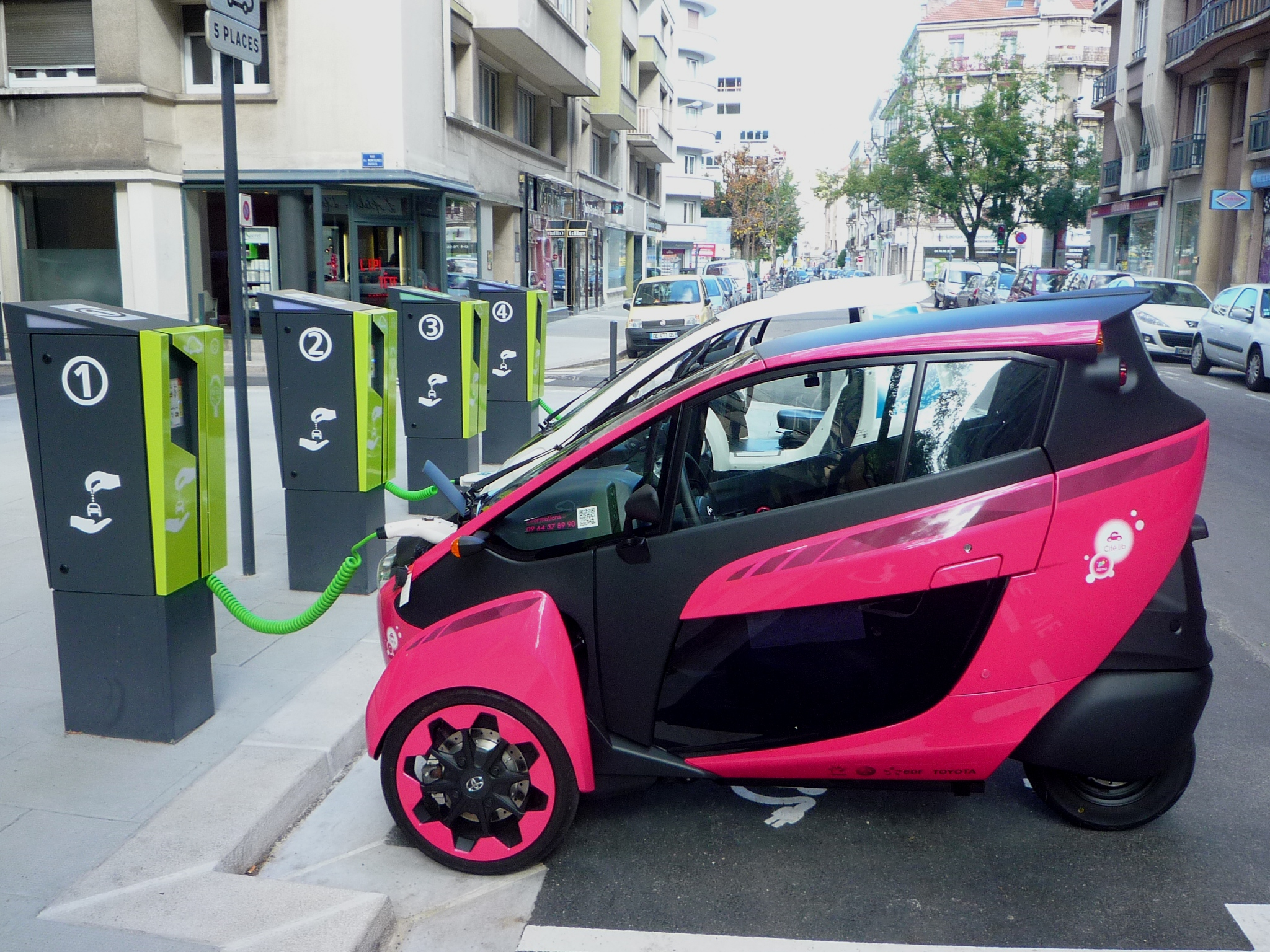
I-Road in Grenoble

Highways link Grenoble to the other major cities in the area including the A48 autoroute to the northwest toward Lyon, the A49 to the southwest toward the Rhone valley via Valence, the A41 to the northeast toward Chambéry, the Alps, and Italy and Switzerland.

A partial ring road around the south of the city, the Rocade Sud, connects the motorway arriving from the northwest (A48) with that arriving from the northeast (A41). A project to complete the ring road, with a tunnel under the Bastille as part of the likely routes, was rejected after its environmental impact studies.

From 2014 to 2017, the city of Grenoble tested the rental of seventy I-Road electric vehicles.

In 2016, the speed limit was lowered to 30 km/h (19 mph) on 80% of the streets of Grenoble and forty-two neighboring municipalities, to both improve safety and reduce pollution levels. The limit, however, remains 50 km/h (31 mph) on the main arteries.

== Culture ==
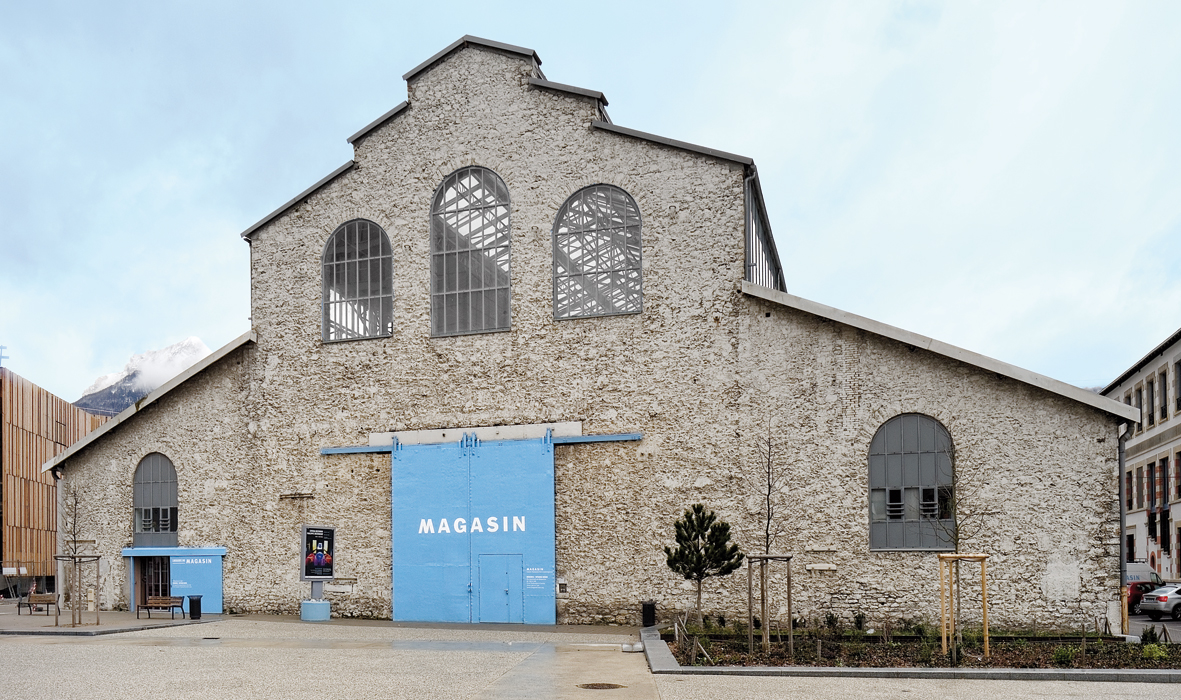
Le Magasin contemporary art centre (2014)

=== Festivals ===
Grenoble hosts several festivals.

The Détours de Babel is a music festival that takes place each March, while another music festival, Cabaret Frappé, is held at the end of July.

The Grenoble Outdoor Short Film Festival has taken place since 1978, with its 49th edition being held in June 2026. Short films are screened at the Cinéma Juliet Berto and in the open air at the Jardin de ville each night, over three days and nights. A number of awards are given to filmmakers of all ages, with some decided by juries and some by audiences. The Grand Prix is awarded by the City of Grenoble, while the Cinémathèque de Grenoble is responsible for many others

=== Venues and performing arts ===
The main cultural centre of the city is called MC2 (for Maison de la culture, version 2), which hosts music, theatre, and dance performances. The Conservatoire de Grenoble, founded in 1935, is close to MC2.

The Summum is the biggest concert hall in Grenoble, and the most famous artists produce there. Another big hall, Le grand angle, is located nearby in Voiron. Smaller halls in the city include the Salle Olivier Messiaen in the Minim Monastery.

There are several theatres in Grenoble, the main one being Grenoble Municipal Theatre (Théatre de Grenoble). Others are the Théâtre de Création, the Théâtre Prémol, and the Théâtre 145. Grenoble also hosts Upstage Productions, which performs once a year through an exclusively English-speaking troupe.

=== Visual arts ===
There are two main art centres in Grenoble: the Centre national d'Art contemporain (also called Le Magasin) and the Centre d'art Bastille.

=== Food ===
Grenoble is known for its walnuts, Noix de Grenoble which enjoy an appellation d'origine contrôlée.

== Crime ==
Crime has been a concern in Grenoble for decades, in particular drug trafficking, and more recently racketeering, especially in the construction field. Crime in Grenoble and its area has grown significantly in the 2020s.

In 2020 there were seven shootings recorded. In 2022, nine different shootings were recorded in under two months. In March 2024, there was a shooting in the suburb of Saint-Bruno, which was one of the primary "deal-points" of rival drug gangs. A few months later, seven shootings were recorded over summer, leading to criticism of the mayor, Éric Piolle. On 12 February 2025, a grenade was thrown into a pub, and a week later, a ram-raid car was used in an arson attack on a recently-opened public library. In March 2025 a former druglord was assassinated on the A41 highway. Several more killings of young men were recorded in December of that year.

== International relations ==
After World War I, one street in the centre of Smederevska Palanka (Serbia) was named French street (Francuska ulica) and one street in Grenoble was named Palanka street (Rue de Palanka). The same neighborhood also has a Belgrade Street (Rue de Belgrade).

=== Twin towns and sister cities ===
Grenoble is twinned with:

Catania, Italy, since 1961; Innsbruck, Austria, since 1963; Essen, Germany, since 1976; Halle, Germany, since 1976; Chișinău, Moldova, since 1977	Oxford, United Kingdom, since 1977; Rehovot, Israel, since 1977; Phoenix, United States, since 1990; Pécs, Hungary, since 1992; (Palestine) Bethlehem, Palestinian Authority, since 1995	Kaunas, Lithuania, since 1997; Sfax, Tunisia, since 1998; Constantine, Algeria, since 1999; Corato, Italy, since 2002; Sevan, Armenia, since 2009; Tsukuba, Japan, since 2013

== Gallery ==
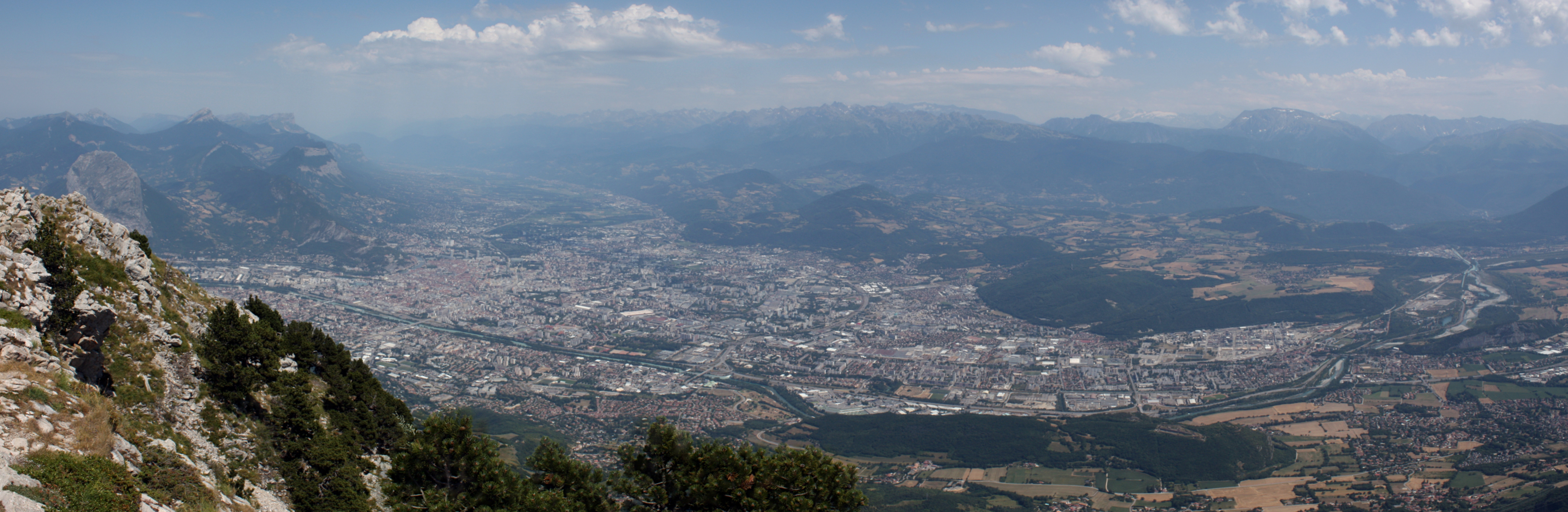
Grenoble from the Vercors ranges

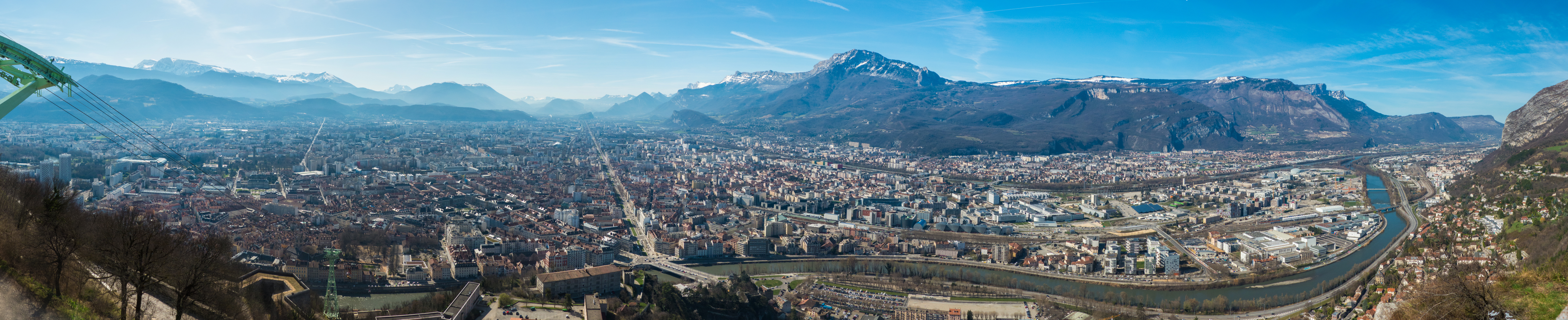
Grenoble (west side) from La Bastille

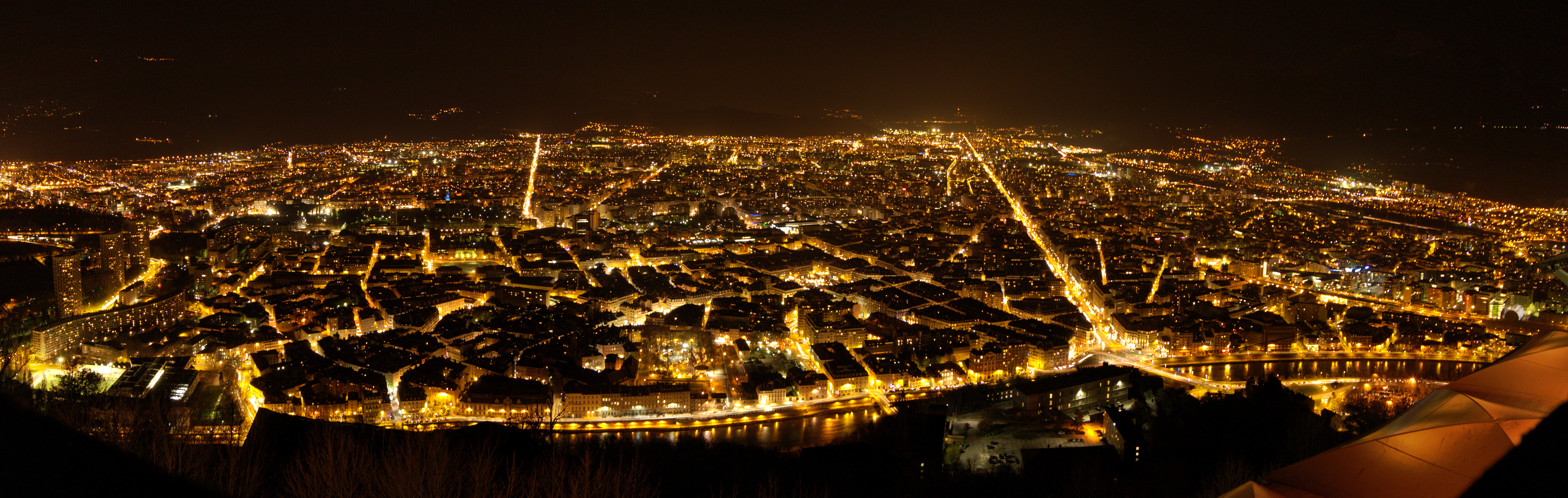
Grenoble at night from La Bastille

== See also ==
- Université Grenoble-Alpes
- Bishopric of Grenoble
- Grand'Place
- List of mayors of Grenoble
- Route Napoléon
- Saint Roch Cemetery
- Arboretum Robert Ruffier-Lanche
- Cellatex
