= Louise Drevet =

French novelist

- Louise Drevet
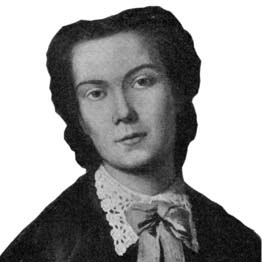
- Born: Marie-Louise Chaffanel; 19 December 1835; Grenoble
- Died: 23 July 1898 (aged 62); Grenoble
- Citizenship: French
- Occupation: novelist
- Spouse: Xavier Drevet
- Writing career
- Pen name: Léo Ferry
- Language: French
- Genre: novel

Louise Drevet, née Marie-Louise Chaffanel (19 December 1835, Grenoble – 23 July 1898, Grenoble) was a French novelist. She was co-founder, editor and contributor to newspaper Le Dauphiné.

== Life ==
Marie-Louise Chaffanel was born in Grenoble on 19 December 1835 to a family from Grésivaudan. Her first literary work was published in Le Voeu national in 1855. In 1857, she married an editor Xavier Drevet. Together they founded a newspaper Le Dauphiné with the aim to increase awareness of the Dauphiné Alps.

Under the pseudonym Léo Ferry Louise Drevet wrote weekly column for Le Dauphiné and remained its editor for 35 years. At the same time, under her married name Louise Drevet, she published numerous fictionalized works on Dauphinoise legends or local history, grouped under the title Nouvelles et légendes dauphinoises.

Her stories were so popular in the region that she was called the Walter Scott of the Dauphiné. She has also collaborated on works intended to make the Dauphiné better known, such as Les Promenades en Dauphiné. Although it is difficult to estimate the exact number of her publications, Louise Drevet, is said to have written more than 60 novels, short stories and legends.

Louise Drevet died on 23 July 1898 in Grenoble.

A street in Grenoble is named after her.

== Works (selection) ==
- Dauphiné bon cœur, 1876
- La Perle du Trièves, 1883
- Iserette, 1888
- Héros sans gloire, 1889
- Nouvelles et légendes dauphinoises, 1891
- Le Petit-fils de Bayard, 1892
- La Dernière Dauphine, Béatrix de Hongrie
- Philis de Charce, 1893
- Les Légendes de Paladru, 1896
- Une aventure de Mandrin, 1898
- La Maison des îles du Drac, 1898
- Les Bessonnes du Manilier
