= Rampe de Laffrey =

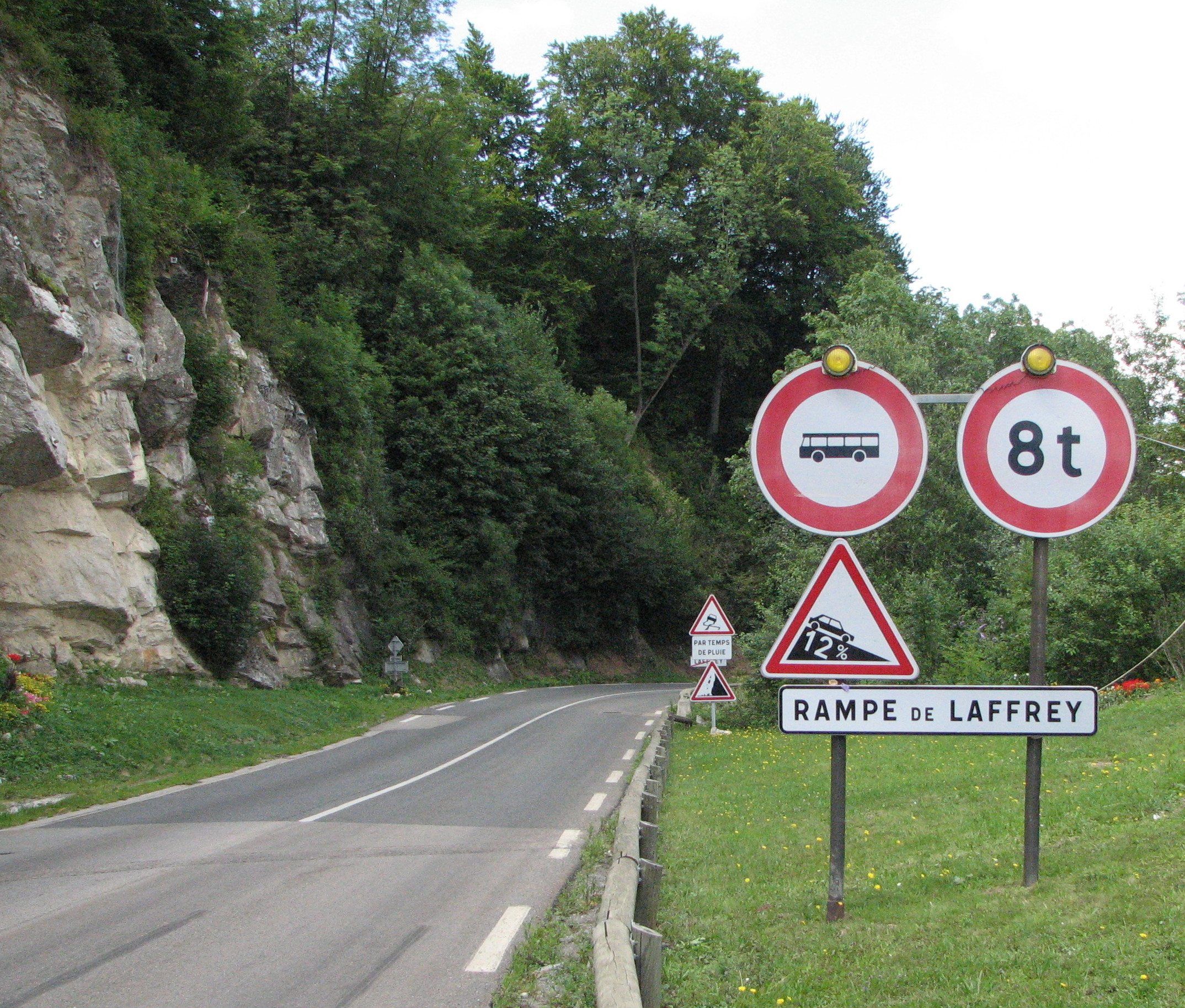
- Beginning of the roadway at the exit of the village of Laffrey

- Location within France
- Elevation: 910 metres (2,990 ft)

Third Approach
- Location: France
- Coordinates: 45°02′11″N 5°46′01″E

The rampe de Laffrey (sometimes called the descente de Laffrey or the côte de Laffrey) is a section of France's Route nationale 85, itself part of the route Napoléon. It connects the communes of Laffrey and Vizille in the department of Isère, about 15 kilometers southeast of Grenoble.

This steep and mostly relatively straight section of road ends in a sharp turn, and it is known for the high number of fatal accidents that have occurred in this final curve. Four of them, in 1946, 1973, 1975, and 2007, involved buses of pilgrims returning from Notre Dame de la Salette, and are among the deadliest in French history.

== Design of the ramp ==
The slope begins in the center of the village of Laffrey at a height of 910 meters, right on the edge of the Matheysine plateau. It descends over 600 metres along the mountainside, passing through the territories of Saint-Pierre-de-Mésage and Notre-Dame-de-Mésage. It then veers sharply to the right at the bridge over the Romanche and entering the town of Vizille, at a height of 300 meters. The road is only slightly sinuous, but at its beginning contains many broad turns while remaining relatively stable near its end. Its steep slope is its most notable feature, averaging 12% along its lower portion and 16 to 18% in some places; it finishes with a 110° turn before the bridge on the Romanche it. Because of its unusual design, Berliet used it until 1970 for testing its trucks. It was also used for motorcycle races beginning in 1960, and at one time was considered a possibility for an Alpine stage of the Tour de France.

== Accidents ==
Many accidents have taken place along this stretch of road; at least 150 deaths have been recorded at the site between 1946 and 2007, primarily of pilgrims returning from Our Lady of La Salette. It is the deadliest roadway section anywhere in France.

- In 1946, a bus transporting pilgrims from Our Lady of La Salette crashed into a ravine, killing 18; today a memorial to the dead stands along the roadside near Saint-Pierre-de-Mésage.
- In 1956, a Dutch bus suffered the same fate at the same place; seven were killed.
- In 1968, a truck flew off the road, killing its two occupants.
- In 1970, another bus transporting pilgrims flew over several walls before coming to a stop; five passengers, from Nord, were killed. The cause of this accident was later determined to be excessive speed.
- Another bus full of pilgrims, returning again from Our Lady of La Salette, crashed near the base of the road in 1973; 43 Belgians were killed.
- In 1974, a truck without brakes hit a car, killing four.
- Another bus returning from Our Lady of La Salette crashed near the base of the road in 1975, in the same location as the previous bus; 29 were killed.
- In 2007, yet another bus full of pilgrims, this time from Poland, crashed on the road, killing 26.

=== 1946 French bus accident ===
The 1946 accident was the first in a string of fatal accidents along this stretch of road, which has been claimed as one of the deadliest in France. 18 people were killed when a bus lost the use of its brakes, flying off the road and into a ravine along the Romanche; the bus was transporting pilgrims from Beaujolais on a return journey from Our Lady of La Salette, where they had been celebrating the Marian Year. A memorial to the dead was later erected near the town of Saint-Pierre-de-Mésage, close to the accident site.

=== 1973 Belgian bus accident ===
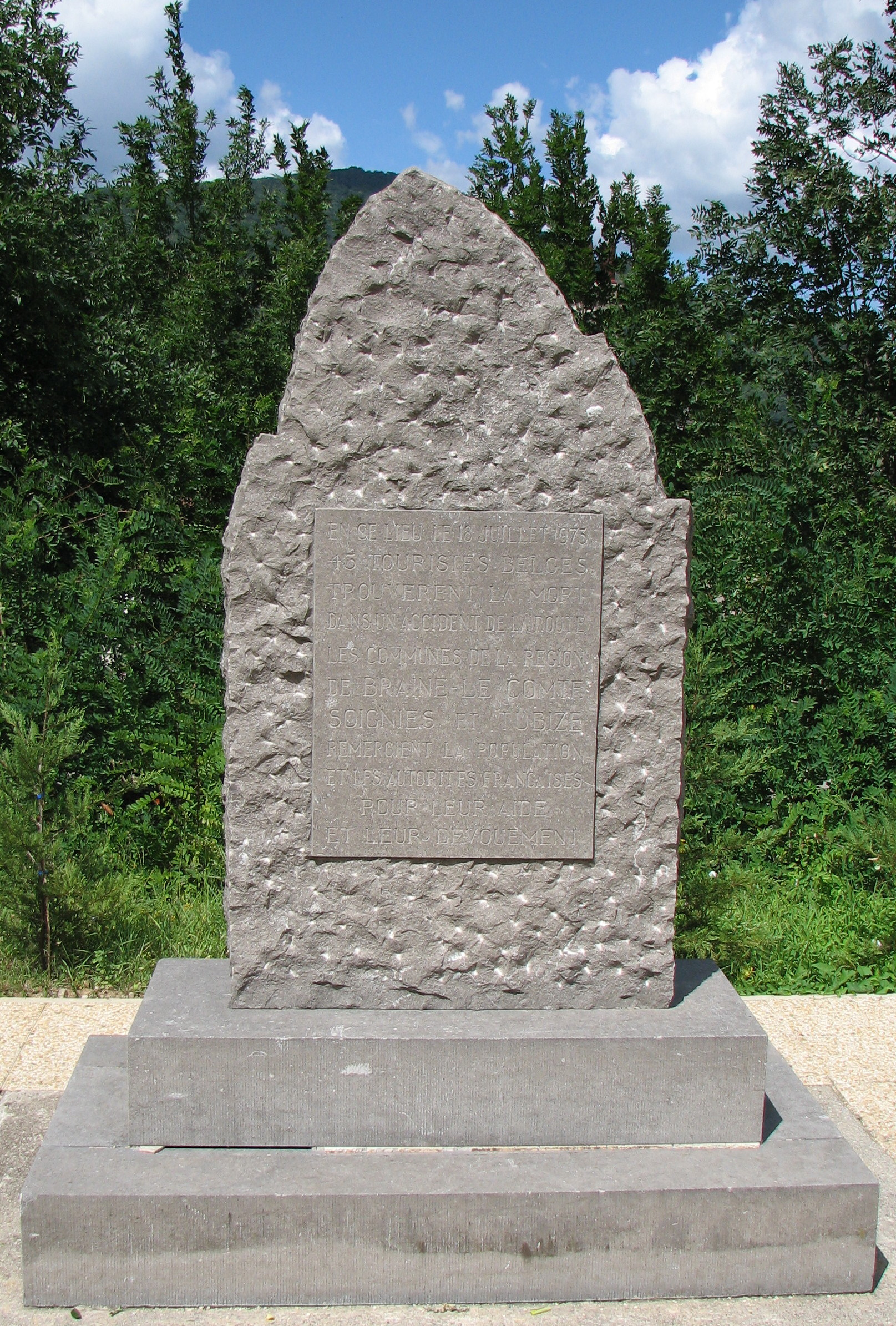
Memorial to the pilgrims killed in the 1973 accident

The 18 July 1973 accident remains, as of 2007, the worst ever to have occurred along that stretch of roadway. A bus was carrying Belgian pilgrims from Braine-le-Comte returning from a visit to the shrine of Our Lady of La Salette; it missed a curve at the base of the road, near its intersection with the bridge over the Romanche, and overturned. Forty-three people were killed and six injured in the resulting crash. After the crash the mayor of Laffrey condemned the route as being particularly dangerous, as it had already claimed over one hundred lives over the previous quarter-century.

The accident is sometimes referred to as the accident de Vizille because it occurred very close to the entrance of the town of that name; the crash site, however, is actually located within the boundaries of the commune of Notre-Dame-de-Mésage. Today a memorial to the victims stands at the site of the accident; it claims the number of dead as forty-five.

=== 1975 French bus accident ===
In an accident on 2 April 1975, 29 pilgrims from Sully-sur-Loire in Loiret were killed when their bus lost its brakes at the bottom of the road, causing it to fly over a ravine at a speed estimated at 120 kilometers an hour; it then crashed into a garden and overturned. As a result of this crash, more careful regulation of electronic braking systems was instituted across France, as were annual inspections of heavy vehicles.

=== 2007 Polish bus accident ===
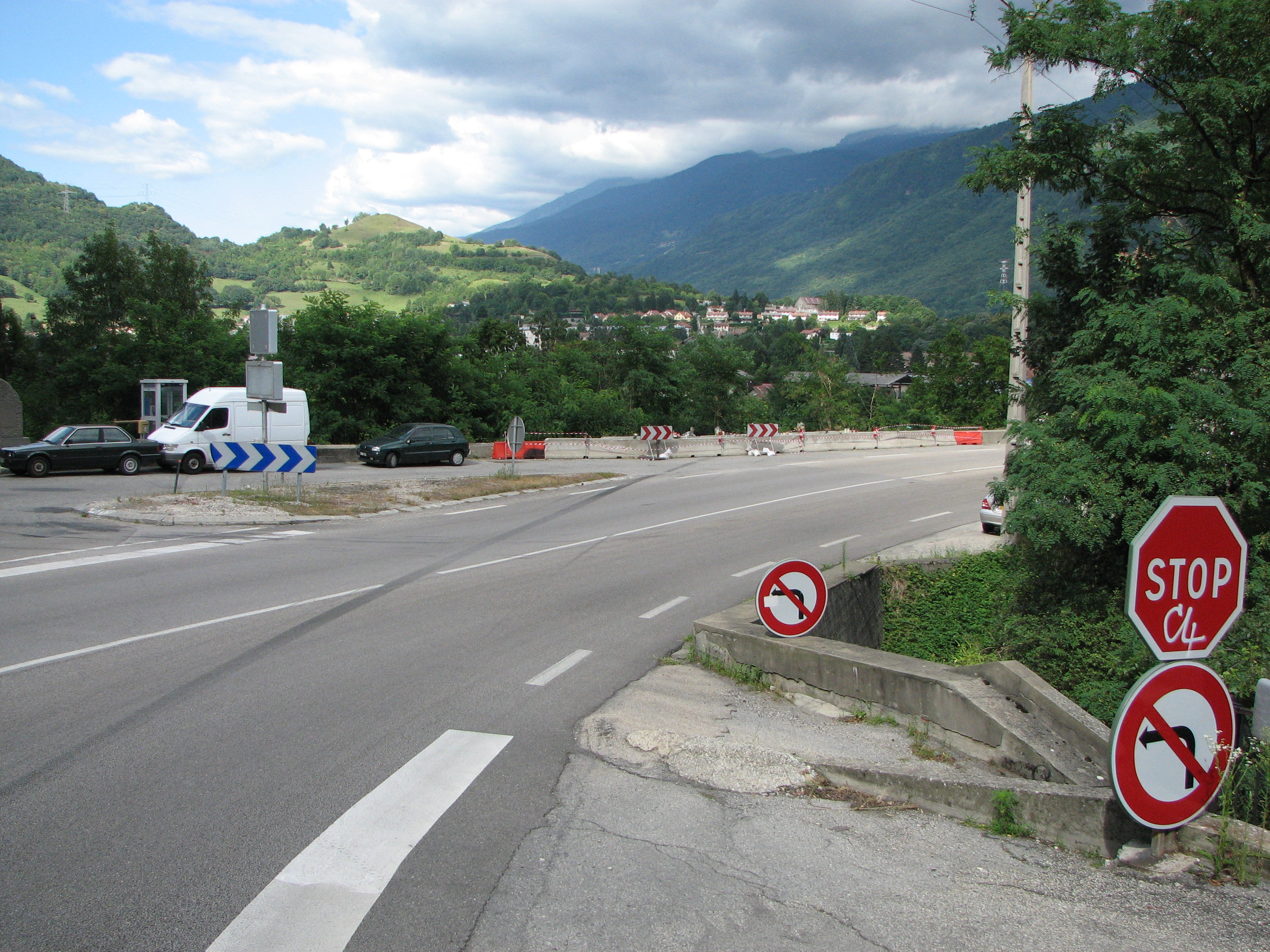
View of the accident site, with the destroyed wall and tire tracks from the bus still visible

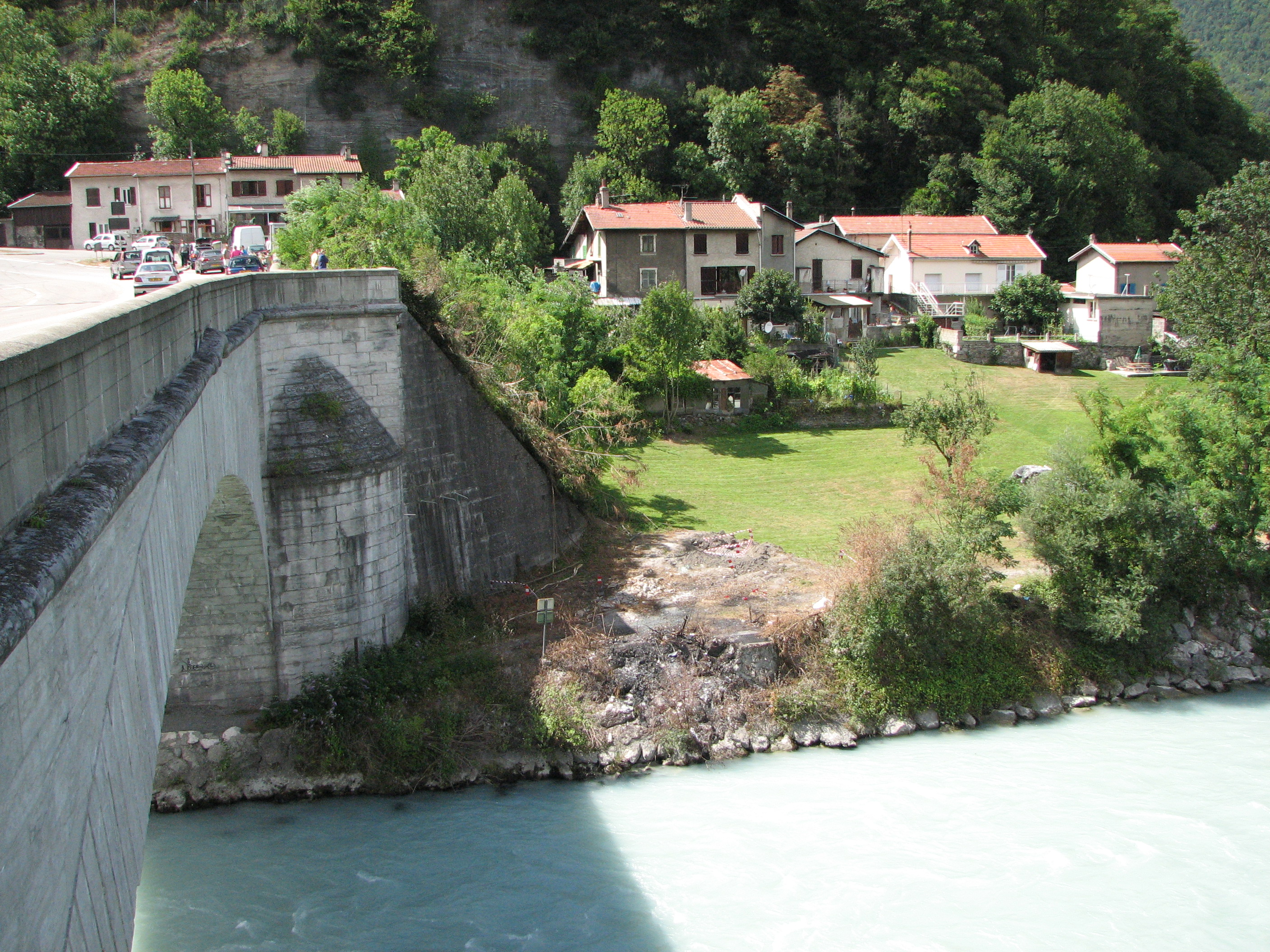
View of the accident site taken eight days later from near the town of Vizille

In circumstances similar to those of the two previous accidents, on 22 July 2007 at 9:30 am, a Polish bus carrying fifty people apparently lost the use of its brakes at the base of the hill. It missed the final curve of the descent and overturned into a ravine near the Romanche, where it immediately burst into flames. The accident occurred at almost the same spot at which a Belgian bus suffered the same fate in 1973, killing 43. Provisional figures as of 9 August put the death toll at 26, with 24 injured, 9 of them seriously, and 3 in intensive care. The accident provoked an outpouring of public support both in France and in Poland. French Prime Minister François Fillon and Jean-Louis Borloo, then the Minister of Ecology and in charge of transport, immediately went to the scene of the accident. Polish president Lech Kaczyński quickly came to Grenoble, where he was met by French president Nicolas Sarkozy; together, the two men visited the bedsides of several victims who had been transported to various local hospitals.

The bus, loaded with pilgrims from Szczecin, Świnoujście, Warsaw and Stargard Szczeciński, had left Poland on 10 July for the start of a tour of Marian sanctuaries in southern Europe. It had made stops at Our Lady of Fatima in Portugal and at Our Lady of Lourdes, and finished at the sanctuary of Our Lady of La Salette. It crashed on its return trip to Poland; 47 pilgrims, a chaperone, and two drivers, all Polish, were on board.

==== Inquiry ====
An inquiry immediately established that the bus should never have been driving along the Rampe in the first place, as use of the road is severely restricted, and forbidden to heavy vehicles without local authorization. This authorization was rarely given, and only for specially equipped vehicles on local transport routes. Eyewitness testimony from survivors indicated that the driver, who, at 22, was the younger of the two assigned to the tour and had had his driver's license for only 10 months, had voluntarily ignored the itinerary. He had chosen instead to follow a shorter route indicated on his GPS, in the process passing no fewer than 14 signs indicating that passage on the road was forbidden to heavy vehicles. Both the other driver and the chaperone were severely injured but survived the crash.

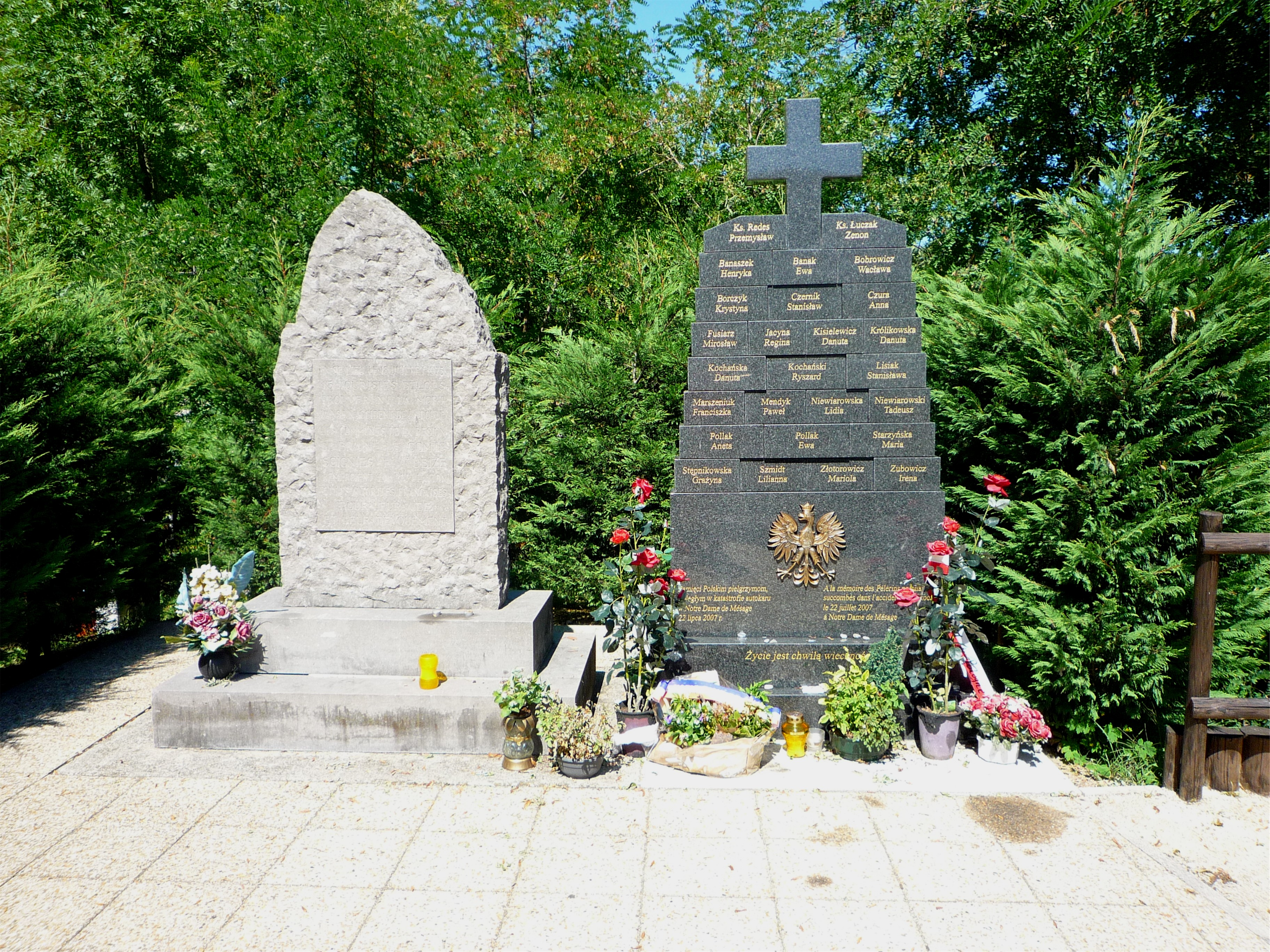
Memorials to the two accidents, in 1973 and 2007.

The bus involved in the accident was a Scania that had entered into circulation in July 2000. According to the Polish operator of the tour, it had passed a technical inspection in Germany three weeks prior to the accident without question. It is not known if the bus was equipped with a speed-reduction system; similar recently built vehicles have been designed with a backup system, either electromagnetic or hydraulic, in addition to the usual brakes.

Motorists who were following the bus during its descent indicated that the brake lights appeared to be working normally. Other drivers, however, indicated that they had seen sparks coming from the undercarriage, suggesting that the brakes may have indeed failed. In addition, a survivor said in her testimony that the driver had warned passengers during the descent, crying out that the brakes had gone; she also said that just before this she had heard something crack under the bus.

==== Aftermath ====
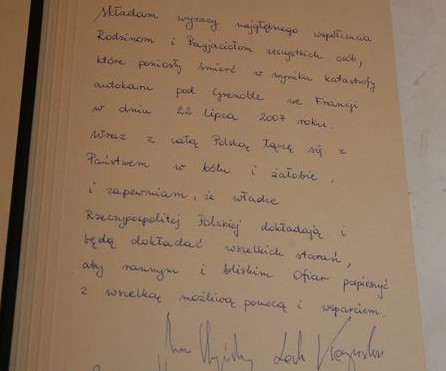
President Kaczynski's entry in a condolence book for the victims

At a press conference on 25 July, Prime Minister Fillon announced that additional restrictions along the roadway would immediately be planned. Flashing signs were to be installed, as were speed bumps as high as the former signs at the location. At the end of September special gantries were also to have been placed, preventing the entry of vehicles over a certain height. A barrier was also planned, containing a magnetic card designed to recognize only certain service vehicles that are authorized to use the road. By January 2008, no gantries had been placed at the site, and only a few of the signs were ready for use. Furthermore, there was a good deal of evidence that unauthorized vehicles still used the road.

The gantries were inaugurated in July 2008.

On 8 October 2007 President Kaczynski presented a special decoration to 32 people who had participated in rescue efforts after the accident. The ceremony took place at the Polish embassy in Paris.

=== Regulations and signage up to July 2007 ===
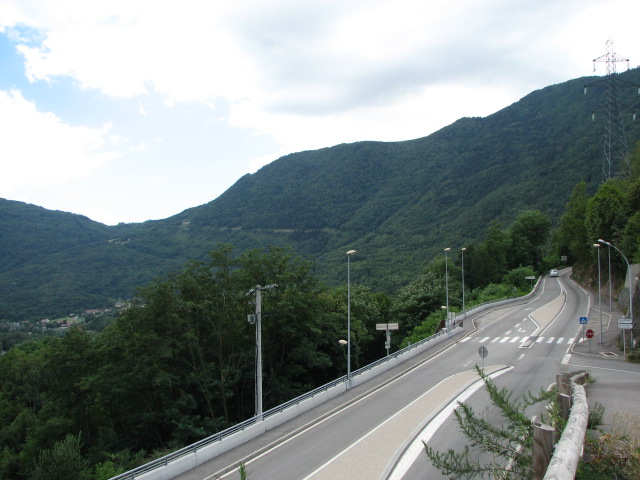
View of the roadway near the town of Notre-Dame-de-Mésage

After a pair of accidents in the 1970s, the route was heavily reworked to make it safer for light vehicles and load-bearing vehicles, but modifications to safely accommodate buses were considered too expensive and difficult. The road was widened, and several sections near the summit were expanded to three lanes. Vehicles over eight tons and buses, except those serving regular local routes, were banned from using the road without specific authorization from the local prefect. Those local and regular services are allowed only on specially designed vehicles with speed-reducers. Buses and trucks coming from the regular route are requested to exit at La Mure and to take secondary road 529 past the massif of Conest towards Grenoble. Many violations of this rule have been noted, though. To discourage violators, a sign with a skull with flickering eyes was formerly installed at the top of the road; however, it was soon removed after being considered in poor taste and politically incorrect.

=== Changes after the accident of 22 July 2007 ===
On 25 July 2007, as a result of the most recent accident on the ramp, French Prime Minister François Fillon held a press conference to announce a series of measures to prevent such a heavy vehicle from attempting the descent again. Flashing signs were installed within days, as were speed bumps at the level of the road signs, designed to ensure driver attention to these signs. In July 2008, height gauges were also set up to physically prevent access for vehicles over a certain height. Authorised vehicles, such as local buses equipped with an improved braking system, are issued with a magnetic card allowing them to bypass the height gauge.

== Appearances in Tour de France ==
The section was first included in the Tour de France in 1951 and has since featured 8 times, most recently in 2010.

Year	Stage	Category	Start	Finish	Leader at the summit
2010	10	1	Chambéry	Gap	Mario Aerts (BEL)
1989	18	2	Le Bourg-d'Oisans	Villard-de-Lans	Laurent Biondi (FRA)
1987	20	1	Villard-de-Lans	Alpe d'Huez	Federico Echave (ESP)
1984	17	1	Grenoble	Alpe d'Huez	Luis Herrera (COL)
1971	11	2	Grenoble	Orcières-Merlette	Joaquim Agostinho (POR)
1970	13	2	Grenoble	Gap	Andrés Gandarias (ESP)
1954	18	2	Grenoble	Briançon	Federico Bahamontes (ESP)
1951	21	2	Briançon	Aix-les-Bains	Gino Bartali (ITA)
