= Cantons of the Isère department =

The following is a list of the 29 cantons of the Isère department, in France, following the French canton reorganisation which came into effect in March 2015:

- Bièvre
- Bourgoin-Jallieu
- Chartreuse-Guiers
- Charvieu-Chavagneux
- Échirolles
- Fontaine-Seyssinet
- Fontaine-Vercors
- Le Grand-Lemps
- Grenoble-1
- Grenoble-2
- Grenoble-3
- Grenoble-4
- Le Haut-Grésivaudan
- L'Isle-d'Abeau
- Matheysine-Trièves
- Meylan
- Morestel
- Le Moyen Grésivaudan
- Oisans-Romanche
- Le Pont-de-Claix
- Roussillon
- Saint-Martin-d'Hères
- Le Sud Grésivaudan
- La Tour-du-Pin
- Tullins
- La Verpillière
- Vienne-1
- Vienne-2
- Voiron
