= Mayres-Savel =

- Commune
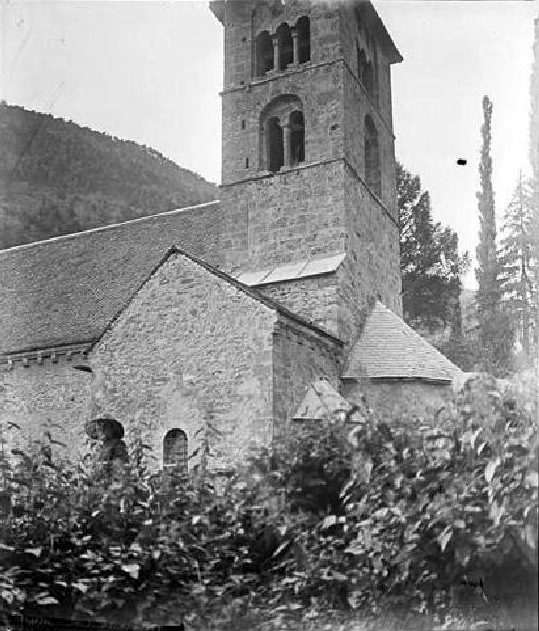
- The church of Saint-Jean-Baptiste in Mayres, at the start of the 20th century
- Location of Mayres-Savel
- Location within France Location within Auvergne-Rhône-Alpes
- Coordinates: 44°52′31″N 5°43′21″E
- Country: France
- Region: Auvergne-Rhône-Alpes
- Department: Isère
- Arrondissement: Grenoble
- Canton: Matheysine-Trièves

Government
  - Mayor (2020–2026): Jean-Michel Brugnera
- Area^{1}: 13 km^{2} (5.0 sq mi)
- Highest elevation: 1,769 m (5,804 ft)
- Lowest elevation: 484 m (1,588 ft)
- Population (2023): 94
  - Density: 7.2/km^{2} (19/sq mi)
- Time zone: UTC+01:00 (CET)
  - Summer (DST): UTC+02:00 (CEST)
- INSEE/Postal code: 38224 /38350
- ^{1} French Land Register data, which excludes lakes, ponds, glaciers > 1 km^{2} (0.386 sq mi or 247 acres) and river estuaries.

Mayres-Savel (French pronunciation: [mɛʁ savɛl]) is a commune in the Isère department in southeastern France. It borders the communes of Marcieu to the west, Saint-Arey to the east and Prunières to the north.

The largest alpine pasture in France, which is called Senépy and is at an altitude of 1769m, is within the boundaries of the commune. It hosts a herd of around 1000 cattle. Mayres-Savel is separated from Saint-Arey by a large ravine. At the border with Saint-Arey, but within the borders of the commune of Mayres-Savel is an unusual rock formation called 'La Demoiselle' (which is French for 'The Maiden'). 'Demoiselle coiffée' is a French word for the rock formation called a hoodoo in English.

== History ==
The Chateau de Savel, at the centre of the eponymous seigneurie ( or fiefdom), was described as a fortified house by Raymond del Sers in a census from 1399 who said "quod dictum castrum non nomiauitur castrum I sed domum fortem" which approximately translates to "as for the castle, it is not called a castle but a fortified house." The Lord of the castle at the time was Lantelme Eynard. The ruins of the Chateau are still within the bounds of Mayre-Savel.

The old bridge across the Drac, the mountain tributary which marked out the limit of the fiefdom, was knocked down in 1720 to isolate the village and protect its inhabitants from the plague.

The commune of Savel was submerged when the Monteynard Dam was built in 1962. To preserve the memory of Savel, its name was incorporated in that of the neighbouring commune of Mayres along with the remaining land from former Savel which was still above water.

== Population ==
Historical population
Year	Pop.	±% p.a.
1968	97	—
1975	78	−3.07%
1982	91	+2.23%
1990	100	+1.19%
1999	107	+0.75%
2007	98	−1.09%
2012	117	+3.61%
2017	97	−3.68%
2023	94	−0.52%
Source: INSEE

Its inhabitants are called Mayrants or Mayrantes in French.

== See also ==
- Communes of the Isère department
