= Ambel, Isère =

Ambel
- Commune
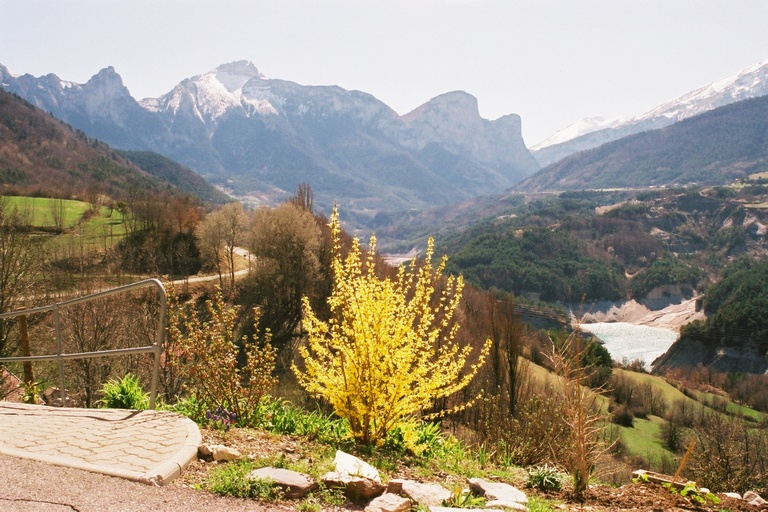
- Valley of the Souloise and the Dévoluy seen from Ambel

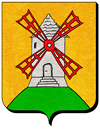
- Coat of arms
- Location of Ambel
- Location within France Location within Auvergne-Rhône-Alpes
- Coordinates: 44°48′21″N 5°55′52″E
- Country: France
- Region: Auvergne-Rhône-Alpes
- Department: Isère
- Arrondissement: Grenoble
- Canton: Matheysine-Trièves
- Intercommunality: Matheysine

Government
  - Mayor (2020–2026): Jean-Claude Abert
- Area^{1}: 5 km^{2} (1.9 sq mi)
- Highest elevation: 1,596 m (5,236 ft)
- Lowest elevation: 735 m (2,411 ft)
- Population (2023): 35
  - Density: 7.0/km^{2} (18/sq mi)
- Time zone: UTC+01:00 (CET)
  - Summer (DST): UTC+02:00 (CEST)
- INSEE/Postal code: 38008 /38970
- ^{1} French Land Register data, which excludes lakes, ponds, glaciers > 1 km^{2} (0.386 sq mi or 247 acres) and river estuaries.

Ambel (French pronunciation: [ɑ̃bˈɛl]) is a commune in the Isère department in the Auvergne-Rhône-Alpes region of southeastern France.

== Geography ==
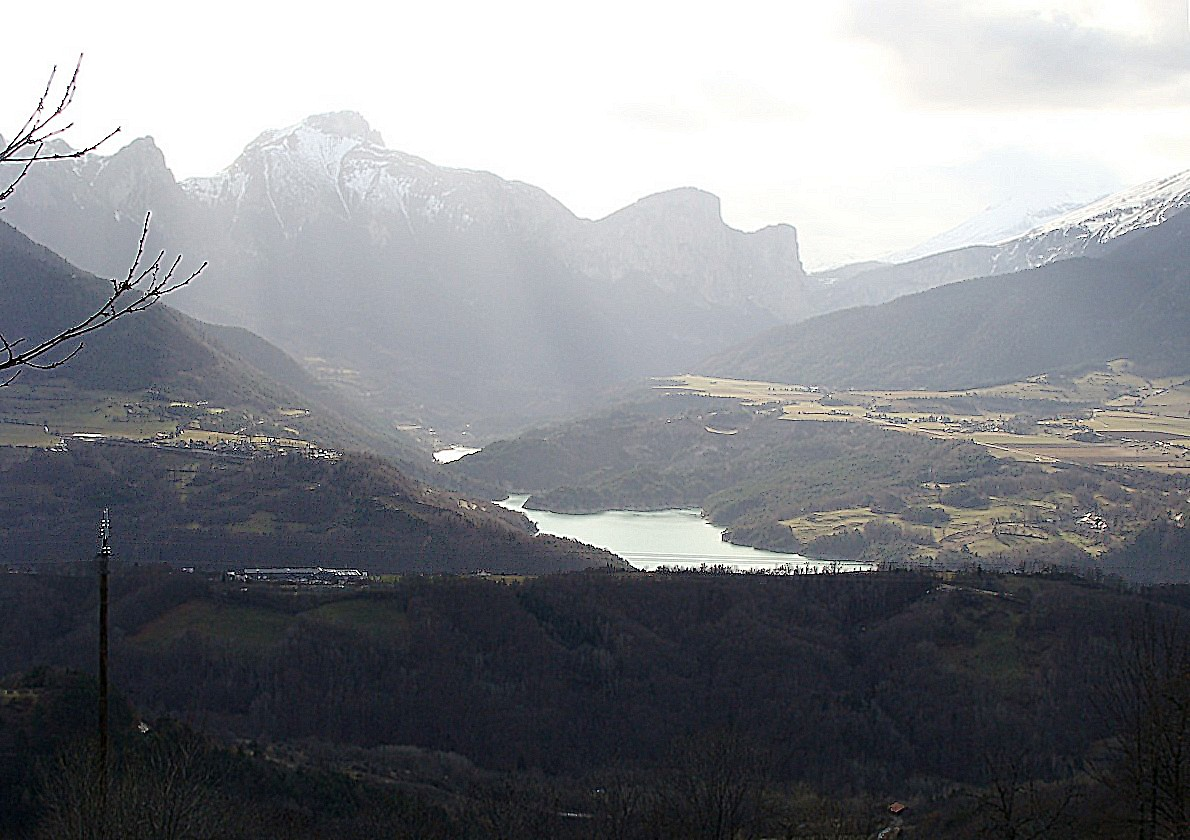
Ambel, next to the Souloise.

Ambel is located at the southern end of the department of Isère, in the Beaumont area, on a small plateau extending north of Faraud Mountain on the eastern edge of the Dévoluy massif between the Drac river which forms the north-eastern border and the Souloise river which forms the western border. The commune is some 20 km south-west of La Mure and some 50 km north by north-east of Veynes although is not directly accessible from the places. Access to the commune is by minor road D217 which branches from national route N85 at Le Motty to the east of the commune. The D217 goes west to the village then turn south to Monestier-d'Ambel.

Ambel overlooks Lake Sautet which is formed by a dam located 1 kilometre north of the village, and dams the two rivers on two sides of the commune. The Plateau of Ambel is one of the residues of an ancient alluvial plain created by a glacial barrier which was at the location of the current dam and subsequently cut through by the Drac and Souloise.Corps to the east and Pellafol to the west are located on the lateral edges of the plain at the same altitude. This gives the local landscape a distinctive aspect with the three villages facing and partially embedded inside the gorge.

== Toponymy ==
Ambel takes its name from the Latin root amb- meaning "with two sides" which refers to the geographical position of the village on a promontory between the Souloise and the Drac valleys: Ambilis in Taraone in low-Latin, Hembel or Hembellum in the 15th century.

== History ==
There was a lordship with a castle at Ambel which existed at the end of the 8th century. Ardradus, son of Bysardon, had a son Eldrade (781-844?) who became a monk and gave up all his rights to Novalesa Abbey in Piedmont, Italy.

The Saracens destroyed everything in the early years of the 10th century. Ambel was part of the Comte de Provence but was liberated in the year 973, then was part of Forcalquier in 1054, then Dauphiné in 1209. When creating the Castellany in 1250, Ambel was part of Corps.

The Lordship of Ambel, which was composed of the two parishes of Ambel and Monestier, was established on 11 March 1315, by dismantling the mandate of Corps in favour of Pierre of Ambel and "as needed" his brother Humbert. Peter had, by concession from the Dauphin, high, middle, and low jurisdiction rights over Ambel. The lordship was transmitted through four generations of the Ambel family until the death of Raymond III around 1445. His eldest son Stephen had died ten years earlier and Raymond left only daughters; the Salic law did not apply to dauphinoise land so the eldest, Burguette, became Lady Ambel and her husband, Raymond de la Villette was Lord "of his wife's head" until his death. In 1470 their two sons, John and Aymar de la Villette, become co-lords of Ambel on the death of their mother and sold the lordship to Jean de Bonne, whose eldest son Peter in 1500 gave rights to his brother Reynaud over Monestier which then became a separate lordship.

The lordship of Ambel, which was now reduced to a mere parish of Ambel, was sold by Pierre de Bonne to Guillaume of Vienne in 1504. The Viennese were Catholic. The Wars of religion raged in Ambel: the village was destroyed and the castle taken and retaken five times between 1562 and 1577. In 1578, Lesdiguières besieged Ambel; Bertrand III Raimbault de Simiane, Baron of Gordes, dislodged him but Lesdiguières returned and took the castle again. Pierre III of Poligny bought the lordship in Vienne in 1617 and resold it to Jean Achard around 1645. Antoine Achard, nephew and heir of Jean, emigrated in 1867 and his fief was confiscated and given to his younger son Judéon. Pierre Achard, the son of Judéon, passed it to his cousin and adopted son Richard Gautier. Marc-Richard, his son, was deposed by the French Revolution.

In 1790 the commune was, like its neighbours, integrated into the department of Hautes-Alpes then a few years later to the department of Isère in the Canton of Corps.

The building of the Sautet Dam in 1935 physically separated Ambel from Corps and Pellafol and this forced long detours to reach the neighbouring communes. A ferry link was attempted, but abandoned after a capsize.

=== The lords of the Ambel family ===
(Dates are not given as they are too uncertain)

- Pierre, created Lord by the Dauphin in 1315 (Pierre I), and Humbert, his brother, Lord "as needed"
- Raymond, son of Pierre I (Raymond I) and Pierre called Perret, his brother (Pierre II) co-Lords
- Henri, son of Raymond I, and Raymond, his brother (Raymond II), co-Lords
- Aymar, son of Henri, Lord, childless
- Raymond, nephew of Henry and Raymond II (Raymond III), Lord, died without male issue in 1445 (date uncertain).

During the wars of religion, a Stephen Ambel, Protestant, whose kinship with the previous Lords was not established, was briefly lord of Ambel.

=== The succession of Raymond III ===
Raymond had five children but his only son, the eldest of the five, died before him. On his death the elder branch of Ambel was extinguished and the eldest daughter, Burguette, passed the lordship of Ambel to her children. The other three sisters, Clemence, Lantelme, and Catherine inherited the lands of high- Valgaudemar which entered the family by the marriage of their great-uncle Henri to Alix de Bonne. Clemence's land remained known as Clemence-d'Ambel until the middle of the 20th century. Those of Catherine passed to her daughter Marguerite whose husband Guillaume Pérouse bought Lantelme's share constituting the territory now known as Guillaume-Pérouse.

=== Heraldry ===
Arms of Ambel	Blazon: Or, a windmill of argent port and window sable with sails gules posed on a hillock vert.

== Administration ==
List of Successive Mayors

From	To	Name
2001	2026	Jean-Claude Abert

== Demography ==
The inhabitants of the commune are known as Ambellons or Ambellonnes in French.

Historical population

Year	Pop.	±% p.a.
1793	139	—
1821	159	+0.48%
1846	273	+2.19%
1872	253	−0.29%
1901	161	−1.55%
1926	100	−1.89%
1936	77	−2.58%
1946	43	−5.66%
1954	51	+2.16%
1962	33	−5.30%

Year	Pop.	±% p.a.
1968	26	−3.90%
1975	27	+0.54%
1982	22	−2.88%
1990	38	+7.07%
1999	22	−5.89%
2007	26	+2.11%
2012	19	−6.08%
2017	28	+8.06%
2023	35	+3.79%

Source: EHESS and INSEE

== Sites and monuments ==
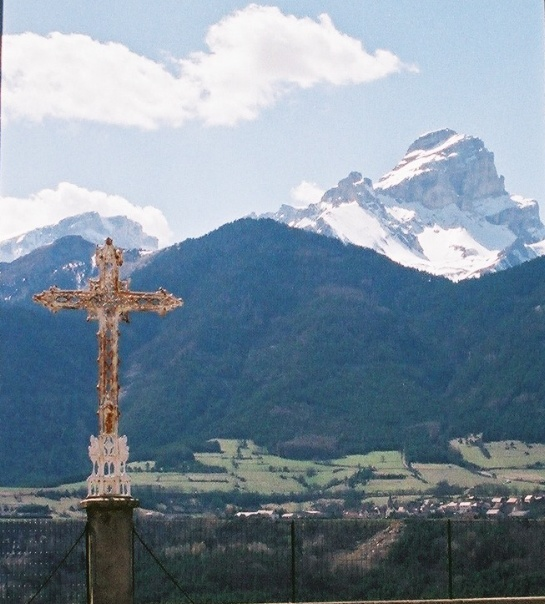
A view of Obiou from Ambel

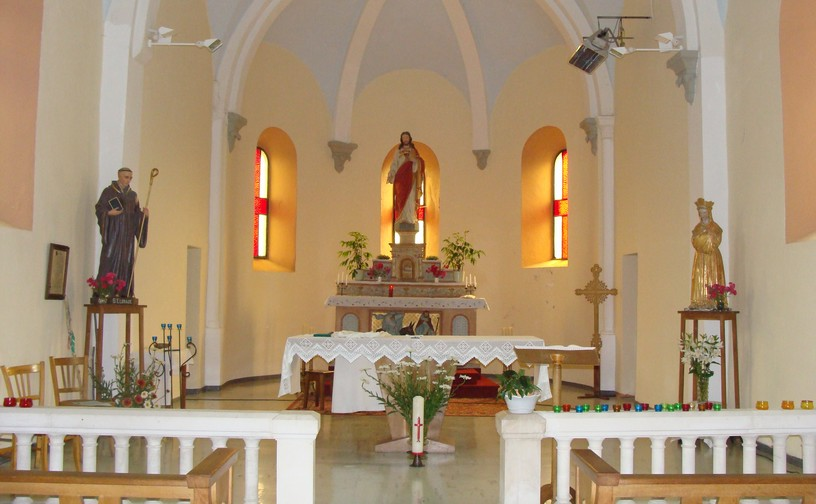
View of the interior of the church. On the left a statue of Saint-Eldrade

On the hill overlooking the village there is surmised to be the remains of the ancient castle.

A little further down is a small 19th-century church. In the forecourt is a view of the Dévoluy and Lake Sautet (the Souloise side) dominated by the Obiou.

== Notable people ==
- Saint Eldrade was born in 781 in Ambel, the son of Lord Aldradus, he chose to be a monk and became superior of Novalesa Abbey in Piedmont. An annual pilgrimage is held from Monestier-d'Ambel towards Ambel. Pilgrims come from the region and sometimes from Le Monêtier-les-Bains and Italy to commemorate the saint.

== See also ==
- Communes of the Isère department

== Bibliography ==
- Jean Gueydan, The Lords of Beaumont, ed. du Cosmogone, 2003, ISBN 2-914238-40-1 (in French).
