= Sousville =

- Commune
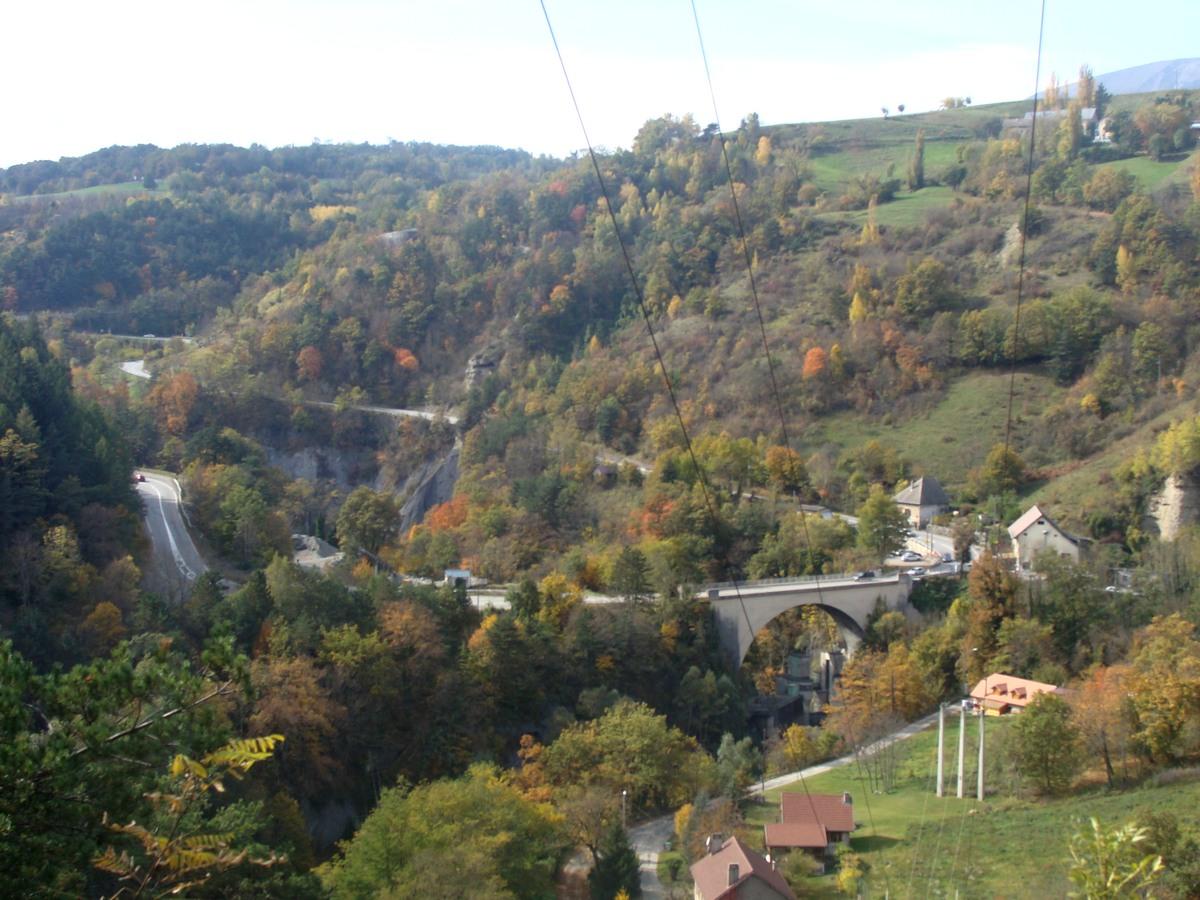
- The high bridge over the Bonne, on the Route Napoléon
- Location of Sousville
- Location within France Location within Auvergne-Rhône-Alpes
- Coordinates: 44°54′51″N 5°48′29″E
- Country: France
- Region: Auvergne-Rhône-Alpes
- Department: Isère
- Arrondissement: Grenoble
- Canton: Matheysine-Trièves

Government
  - Mayor (2022–2026): Denis Poncet
- Area^{1}: 3 km^{2} (1.2 sq mi)
- Elevation: 760 m (2,490 ft)
- Highest elevation: 942 m (3,091 ft)
- Lowest elevation: 560 m (1,840 ft)
- Population (2023): 141
  - Density: 47/km^{2} (120/sq mi)
- Time zone: UTC+01:00 (CET)
  - Summer (DST): UTC+02:00 (CEST)
- INSEE/Postal code: 38497 /38350
- ^{1} French Land Register data, which excludes lakes, ponds, glaciers > 1 km^{2} (0.386 sq mi or 247 acres) and river estuaries.

Sousville (French pronunciation: [suvil]) is a commune in the Isère department in southeastern France.

== Population ==
Historical population
Year	Pop.	±% p.a.
1968	108	—
1975	89	−2.73%
1982	85	−0.65%
1990	98	+1.79%
1999	124	+2.65%
2007	132	+0.78%
2012	146	+2.04%
2017	140	−0.84%
2023	141	+0.12%
Source: INSEE

== See also ==
- Communes of the Isère department
