= Laffrey =

- Commune
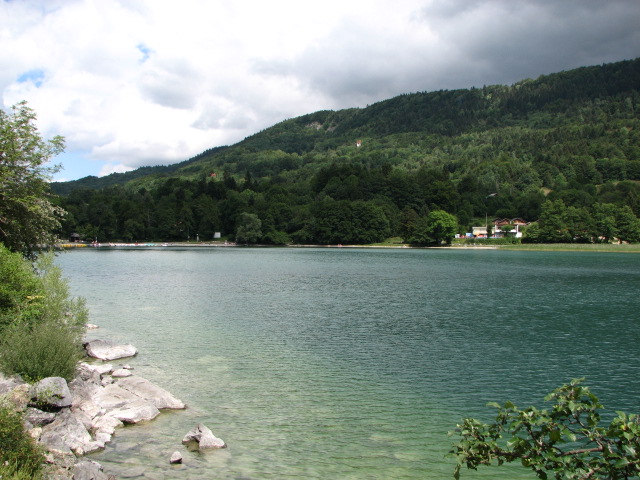
- Laffrey Lake

- Coat of arms
- Location of Laffrey
- Location within France Location within Auvergne-Rhône-Alpes
- Coordinates: 45°01′30″N 5°46′22″E
- Country: France
- Region: Auvergne-Rhône-Alpes
- Department: Isère
- Arrondissement: Grenoble
- Canton: Matheysine-Trièves
- Intercommunality: Matheysine

Government
  - Mayor (2020–2026): Philippe Faure
- Area^{1}: 6.72 km^{2} (2.59 sq mi)
- Highest elevation: 1,262 m (4,140 ft)
- Lowest elevation: 680 m (2,230 ft)
- Population (2023): 466
  - Density: 69.3/km^{2} (180/sq mi)
- Time zone: UTC+01:00 (CET)
  - Summer (DST): UTC+02:00 (CEST)
- INSEE/Postal code: 38203 /38220
- ^{1} French Land Register data, which excludes lakes, ponds, glaciers > 1 km^{2} (0.386 sq mi or 247 acres) and river estuaries.

Laffrey (French pronunciation: [lafʁɛ]) is a commune in the Isère department in southeastern France. It stands at the top of the Rampe de Laffrey, which is known for a large number of deadly automobile accidents.

== History ==
Napoleon passed through the village on 7 March 1815, during his return from Elba at the beginning of the Hundred Days. At a site in Laffrey now known as the "field of the encounter" (prairie de la Rencontre), Napoleon and the handful of troops accompanying him were met by a battalion of soldiers of the royal 5th Regiment of the Line, who had come to arrest him. Leaving behind his men, Napoleon presented himself to the soldiers and declared, "If any of you will shoot his Emperor, here I am". The soldiers defected to his cause, crying Vive l'Empereur! ("Long live the Emperor!"). An equestrian statue of Napoleon by Emmanuel Frémiet, installed on the field in 1930, commemorates this event.

== Population ==
Historical population
Year	Pop.	±% p.a.
1968	238	—
1975	198	−2.59%
1982	211	+0.91%
1990	249	+2.09%
1999	311	+2.50%
2007	357	+1.74%
2012	402	+2.40%
2017	455	+2.51%
2023	466	+0.40%
Source: INSEE

== See also ==
- Communes of the Isère department
- Rampe de Laffrey
- Grand lac de Laffrey
- Route Napoléon
