= Arboretum de Combe Noire =

Arboretum near La Mure, Isère, Rhône-Alpes, France

Coordinates: 44.96°N 5.783°E

The Arboretum de Combe Noire (20 hectares) is an arboretum located near La Mure, Isère, Rhône-Alpes, France. It is open daily without charge in the warmer months.

The arboretum was established in 1992 by teachers in La Mure to help mingle mentally handicapped children with those of normal schooling. In collaboration with the National Forestry Office, teachers and children cleared and planted fallow land at an altitude of about 1400 meters in Signaraux. Hundreds of trees were planted in that first year, with follow-up plantings and trail maintenance since. There are currently two trail circuits through the site.

== See also ==
- List of botanical gardens in France
