= Pellafol =

- Commune
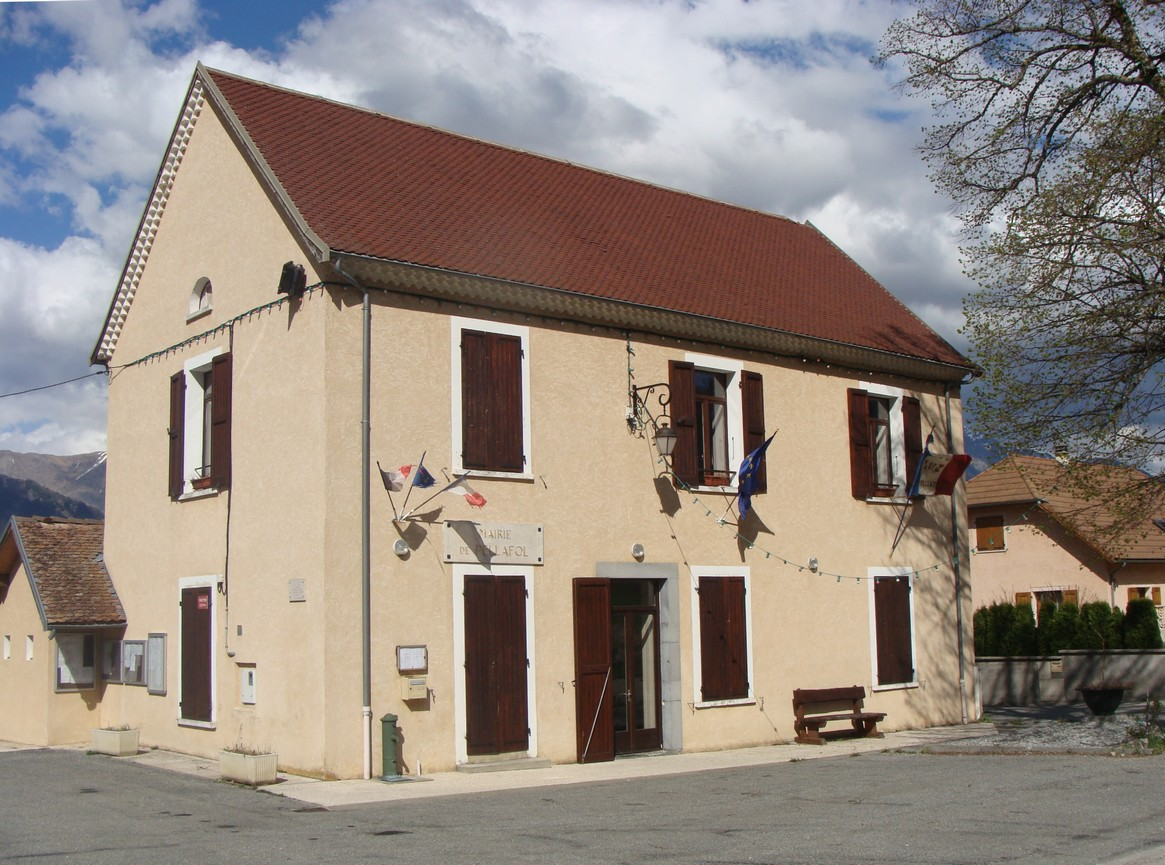
- The town hall of Pellafol
- Location of Pellafol
- Location within France Location within Auvergne-Rhône-Alpes
- Coordinates: 44°47′50″N 5°54′39″E
- Country: France
- Region: Auvergne-Rhône-Alpes
- Department: Isère
- Arrondissement: Grenoble
- Canton: Matheysine-Trièves

Government
  - Mayor (2020–2026): Thierry Joubert
- Area^{1}: 35 km^{2} (14 sq mi)
- Elevation: 934 m (3,064 ft)
- Highest elevation: 2,793 m (9,163 ft)
- Lowest elevation: 639 m (2,096 ft)
- Population (2023): 136
  - Density: 3.9/km^{2} (10/sq mi)
- Time zone: UTC+01:00 (CET)
  - Summer (DST): UTC+02:00 (CEST)
- INSEE/Postal code: 38299 /38970
- ^{1} French Land Register data, which excludes lakes, ponds, glaciers > 1 km^{2} (0.386 sq mi or 247 acres) and river estuaries.

Pellafol (French pronunciation: [pɛlafɔl]) is a commune in the Isère department in southeastern France.

== Geography ==
Pellafol is situated 7 km (4.3 mi) to the south of Dauphiné and Dévoluy (midway between Grenoble and Gap) on a plateau near Lake Sautet, It has limited entry to the departments of Isère and Hautes-Alpes.

== Neighboring communes ==
Corps, Cordéac, Ambel, Beaufin, Saint-Étienne-en-Dévoluy.

== History ==
Historically, Pellafol was a former fort château.

== Administration ==
Since 2014, Thierry Joubert has been the mayor of Pellafol. He was re-elected in the 2020 municipal elections.

List of successive mayors
Term	Name
2001–2008	Yves Moutin
2008	Jean Pierre Arneaudo
2008–2014	Agnès Robert
2014–2026	Thierry Joubert

== Population ==
Historical population
Year	Pop.	±% p.a.
1968	245	—
1975	200	−2.86%
1982	152	−3.84%
1990	149	−0.25%
1999	137	−0.93%
2007	135	−0.18%
2012	136	+0.15%
2017	136	+0.00%
2023	136	+0.00%
Source: INSEE

== See also ==
- Communes of the Isère department
