= La Mure =

- Commune
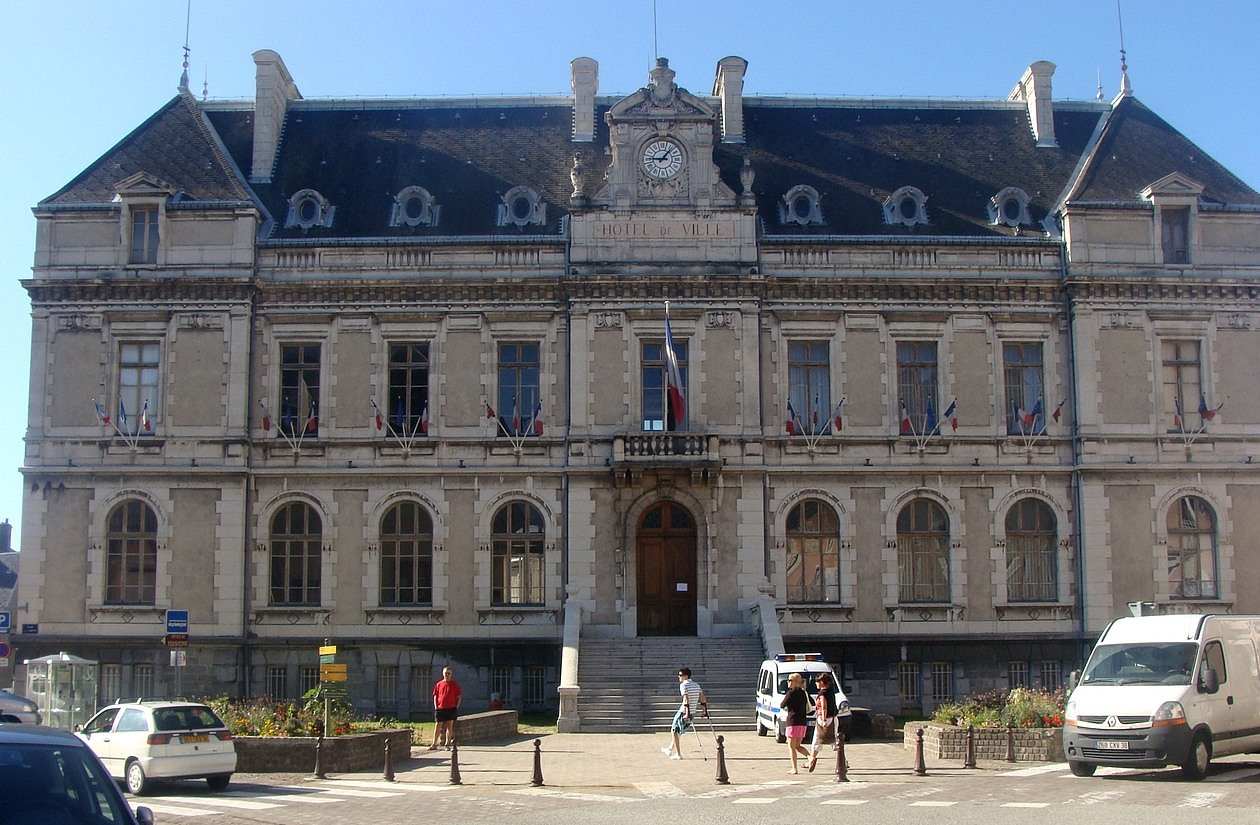
- Town hall

- Coat of arms
- Location of La Mure
- Location within France Location within Auvergne-Rhône-Alpes
- Coordinates: 44°54′14″N 5°47′17″E
- Country: France
- Region: Auvergne-Rhône-Alpes
- Department: Isère
- Arrondissement: Grenoble
- Canton: Matheysine-Trièves
- Intercommunality: La Matheysine

Government
  - Mayor (2020–2026): Éric Bonnier
- Area^{1}: 8 km^{2} (3.1 sq mi)
- Elevation: 886 m (2,907 ft)
- Highest elevation: 1,204 m (3,950 ft)
- Lowest elevation: 720 m (2,360 ft)
- Population (2023): 4,963
  - Density: 620/km^{2} (1,600/sq mi)
- Time zone: UTC+01:00 (CET)
  - Summer (DST): UTC+02:00 (CEST)
- INSEE/Postal code: 38269 /38350
- ^{1} French Land Register data, which excludes lakes, ponds, glaciers > 1 km^{2} (0.386 sq mi or 247 acres) and river estuaries.

La Mure (French pronunciation: [la myʁ]) is a commune in the Isère département in southeastern France. It is located 35 km (22 mi) south of Grenoble on the plateau Matheysin.

The commune is listed as a Village étape.

== Population ==
Historical population

Year	Pop.	±% p.a.
1793	2,147	—
1800	1,686	−3.39%
1806	1,818	+1.26%
1821	1,933	+0.41%
1831	2,785	+3.72%
1836	3,097	+2.15%
1841	3,106	+0.06%
1846	3,439	+2.06%
1851	3,648	+1.19%
1856	3,319	−1.87%
1861	3,628	+1.80%
1866	3,565	−0.35%
1872	3,577	+0.06%
1876	3,560	−0.12%
1881	3,526	−0.19%
1886	3,574	+0.27%
1891	3,401	−0.99%
1896	3,384	−0.10%
1901	3,377	−0.04%

Year	Pop.	±% p.a.
1906	3,466	+0.52%
1911	3,595	+0.73%
1921	3,711	+0.32%
1926	3,906	+1.03%
1931	4,423	+2.52%
1936	4,420	−0.01%
1946	4,922	+1.08%
1954	5,595	+1.61%
1962	6,111	+1.11%
1968	6,196	+0.23%
1975	5,522	−1.63%
1982	5,657	+0.35%
1990	5,480	−0.40%
1999	5,190	−0.60%
2007	5,076	−0.28%
2012	5,028	−0.19%
2017	4,948	−0.32%
2023	4,963	+0.05%

Source: EHESS and INSEE (1968-2023)

== Sights ==
- The Chemin de fer de la Mure is a small touristic train using a railway initially built for the transportation of coal between Saint-Georges-de-Commiers and La Mure. The line was inaugurated on 24 July 1888.
- The Arboretum de Combe Noire is a nearby arboretum created by teachers and staff

== Personalities ==
- Saint Pierre-Julien Eymard, Roman Catholic priest founder of Congregation of the Blessed Sacrament and canonized in 1962, was born in la Mure on 4 February 1811.

== Neighbouring communes ==
- Prunières
- Sousville
- Susville
- Ponsonnas
- Pierre-Châtel
- Saint-Honoré

== International relations ==
La Mure is twinned with Marktredwitz, Germany.

== See also ==
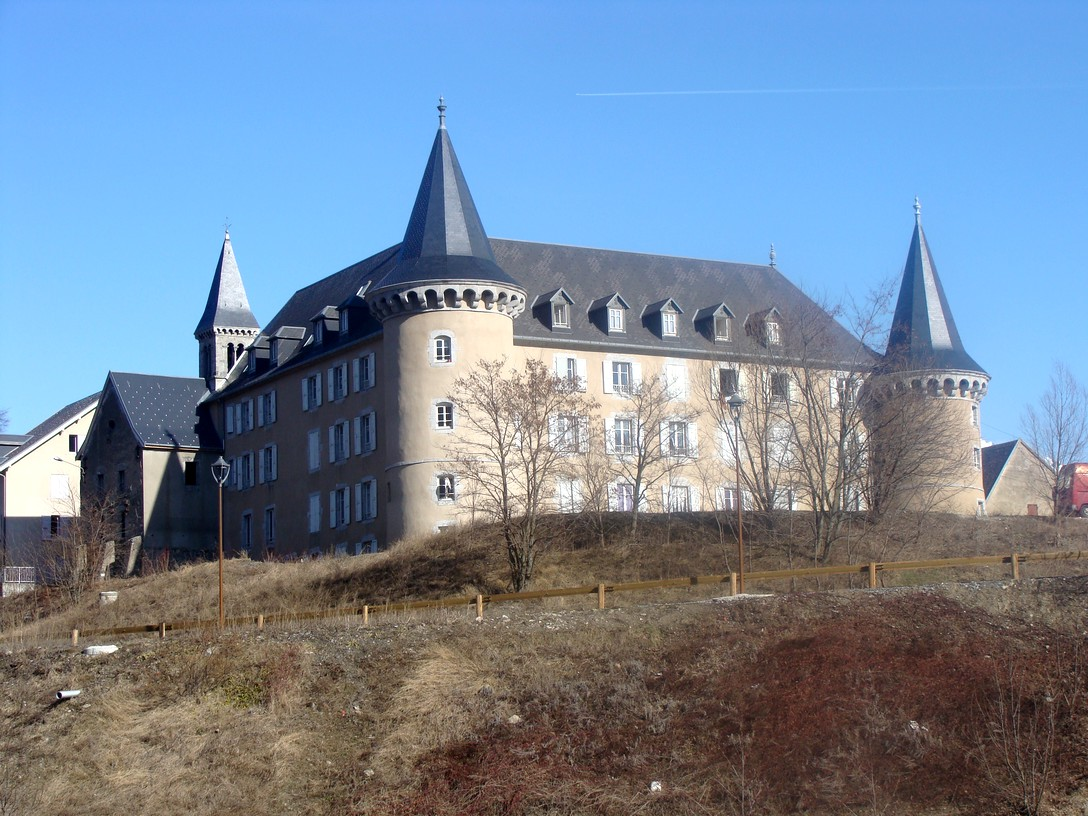
Le château de Beaumont

- Communes of the Isère department
- Route Napoléon
