= Saint-Pierre-de-Mésage =

- Commune
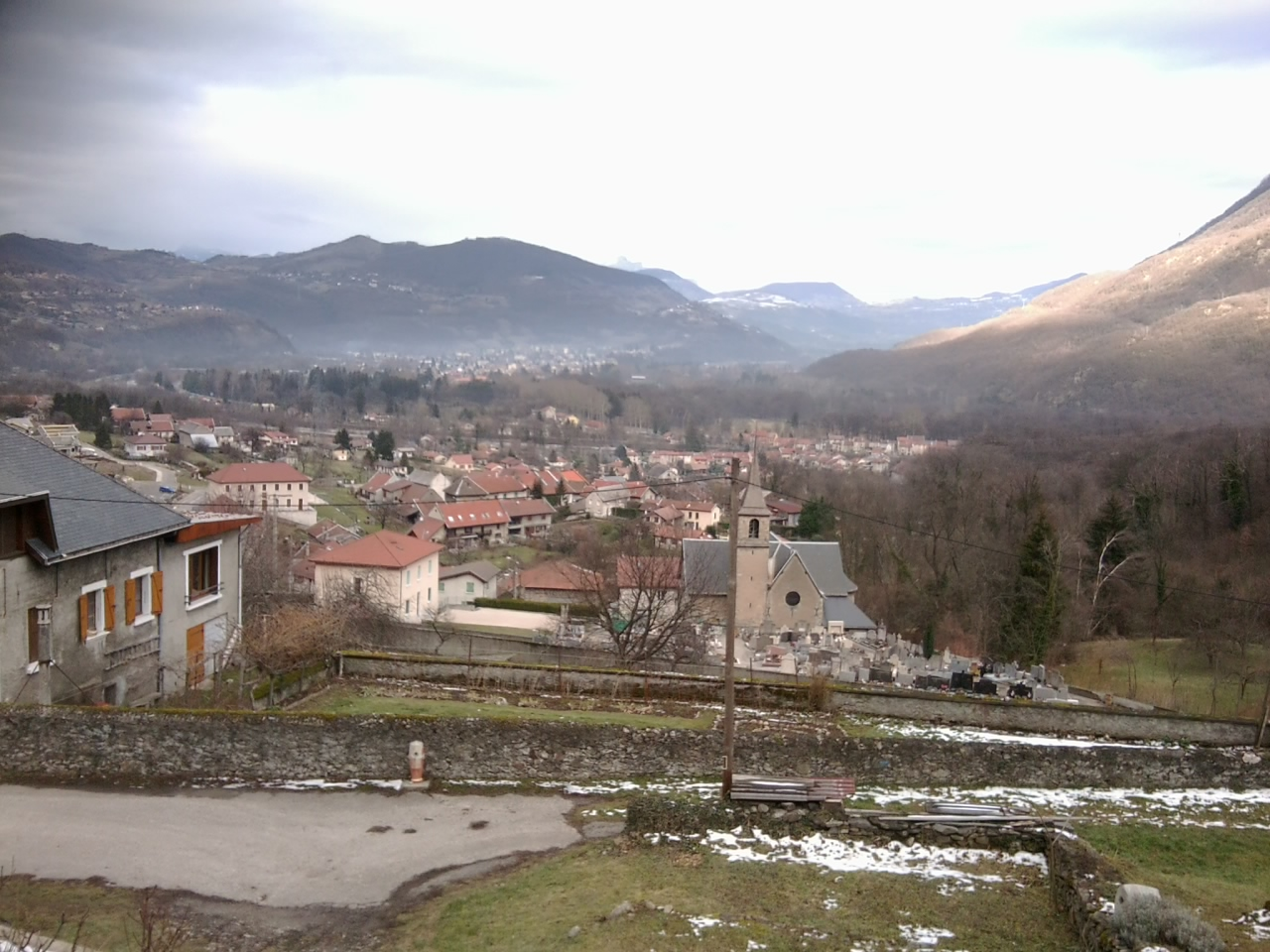
- A general view of Saint-Pierre-de-Mésage
- Location of Saint-Pierre-de-Mésage
- Location within France Location within Auvergne-Rhône-Alpes
- Coordinates: 45°03′14″N 5°45′51″E
- Country: France
- Region: Auvergne-Rhône-Alpes
- Department: Isère
- Arrondissement: Grenoble
- Canton: Oisans-Romanche
- Intercommunality: Grenoble-Alpes Métropole

Government
  - Mayor (2020–2026): Christian Masnada
- Area^{1}: 7.03 km^{2} (2.71 sq mi)
- Elevation: 340 m (1,120 ft)
- Highest elevation: 1,342 m (4,403 ft)
- Lowest elevation: 289 m (948 ft)
- Population (2023): 784
  - Density: 112/km^{2} (289/sq mi)
- Time zone: UTC+01:00 (CET)
  - Summer (DST): UTC+02:00 (CEST)
- INSEE/Postal code: 38445 /38220
- ^{1} French Land Register data, which excludes lakes, ponds, glaciers > 1 km^{2} (0.386 sq mi or 247 acres) and river estuaries.

Saint-Pierre-de-Mésage (French pronunciation: [sɛ̃ pjɛʁ də mezaʒ]; Arpitan: Sant-Pierro-de-Mèsâjo) is a commune in the Isère department in southeastern France.

Saint-Pierre-de-Mésage is located next to the mountain of Connex and between the Vercors and Taillefer. Near Vizille and Grenoble.

In 1946 an accident along the Rampe de Laffrey killed 18 near here.

== Population ==
Historical population
Year	Pop.	±% p.a.
1968	510	—
1975	508	−0.06%
1982	584	+2.01%
1990	660	+1.54%
1999	674	+0.23%
2007	708	+0.62%
2012	735	+0.75%
2017	764	+0.78%
2023	784	+0.43%
Source: INSEE

== See also ==
- Communes of the Isère department
