= Monestier-d'Ambel =

- Commune
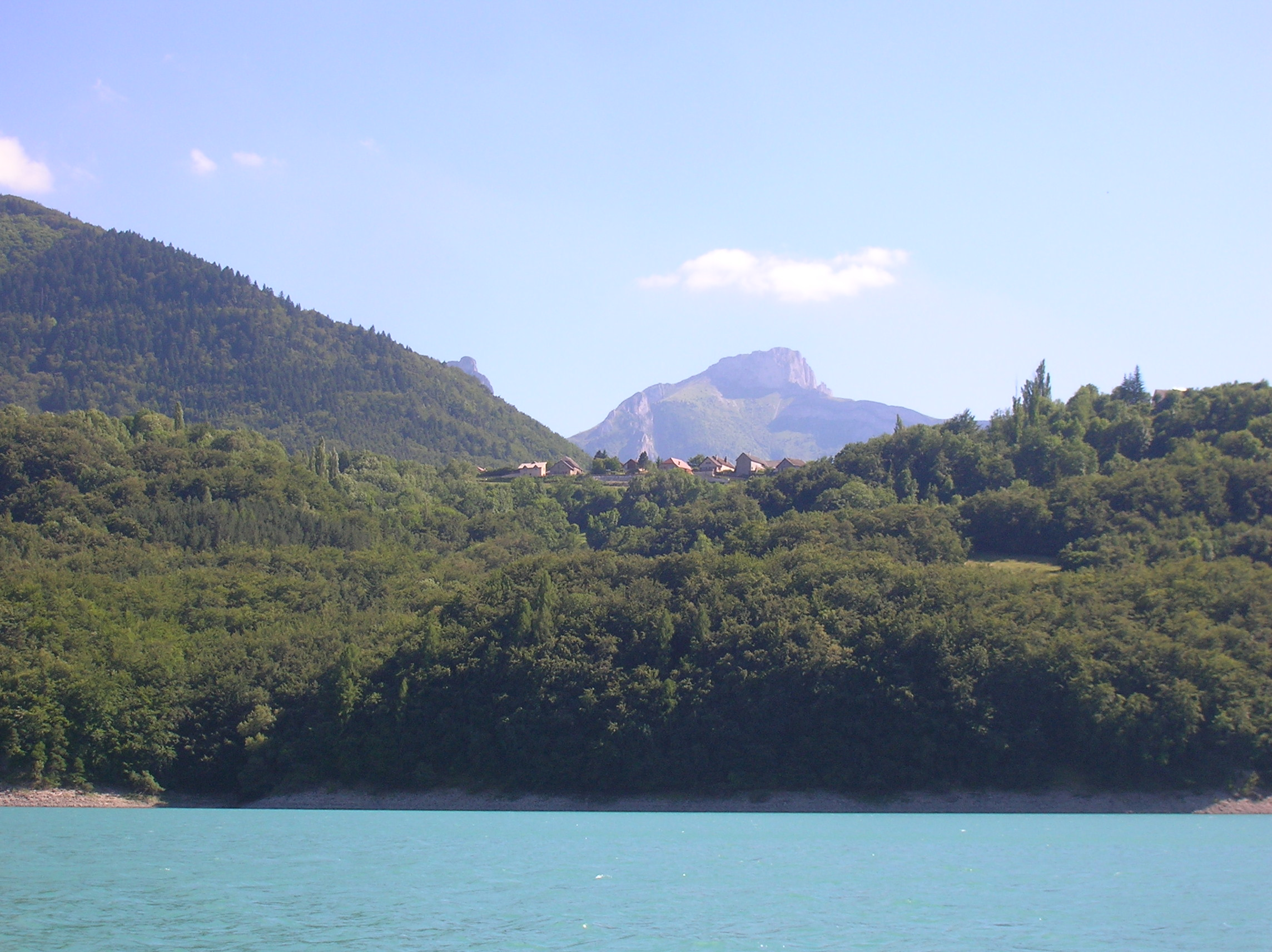
- The village seen from the Lac du Sautet
- Location of Monestier-d'Ambel
- Location within France Location within Auvergne-Rhône-Alpes
- Coordinates: 44°46′41″N 5°55′27″E
- Country: France
- Region: Auvergne-Rhône-Alpes
- Department: Isère
- Arrondissement: Grenoble
- Canton: Matheysine-Trièves
- Intercommunality: Matheysine

Government
  - Mayor (2020–2026): Franck Gerbi
- Area^{1}: 11 km^{2} (4.2 sq mi)
- Elevation: 950 m (3,120 ft)
- Highest elevation: 2,378 m (7,802 ft)
- Lowest elevation: 746 m (2,448 ft)
- Population (2023): 14
  - Density: 1.3/km^{2} (3.3/sq mi)
- Time zone: UTC+01:00 (CET)
  - Summer (DST): UTC+02:00 (CEST)
- INSEE/Postal code: 38241 /38970
- ^{1} French Land Register data, which excludes lakes, ponds, glaciers > 1 km^{2} (0.386 sq mi or 247 acres) and river estuaries.

Monestier-d'Ambel (French pronunciation: [mɔnɛstje dɑ̃bɛl], literally Monestier of Ambel) is a commune in the Isère department in southeastern France.

== Population ==
Historical population
| Year | Pop. | ±% p.a. |
|---|---|---|
| 1968 | 32 | — |
| 1975 | 30 | −0.92% |
| 1982 | 48 | +6.94% |
| 1990 | 64 | +3.66% |
| 1999 | 20 | −12.12% |
| 2007 | 22 | +1.20% |
| 2012 | 22 | +0.00% |
| 2017 | 21 | −0.93% |
| 2023 | 14 | −6.53% |
Source: INSEE

== See also ==
- Communes of the Isère department
- Grande Tête de l'Obiou
