= Beaufin =

- Commune
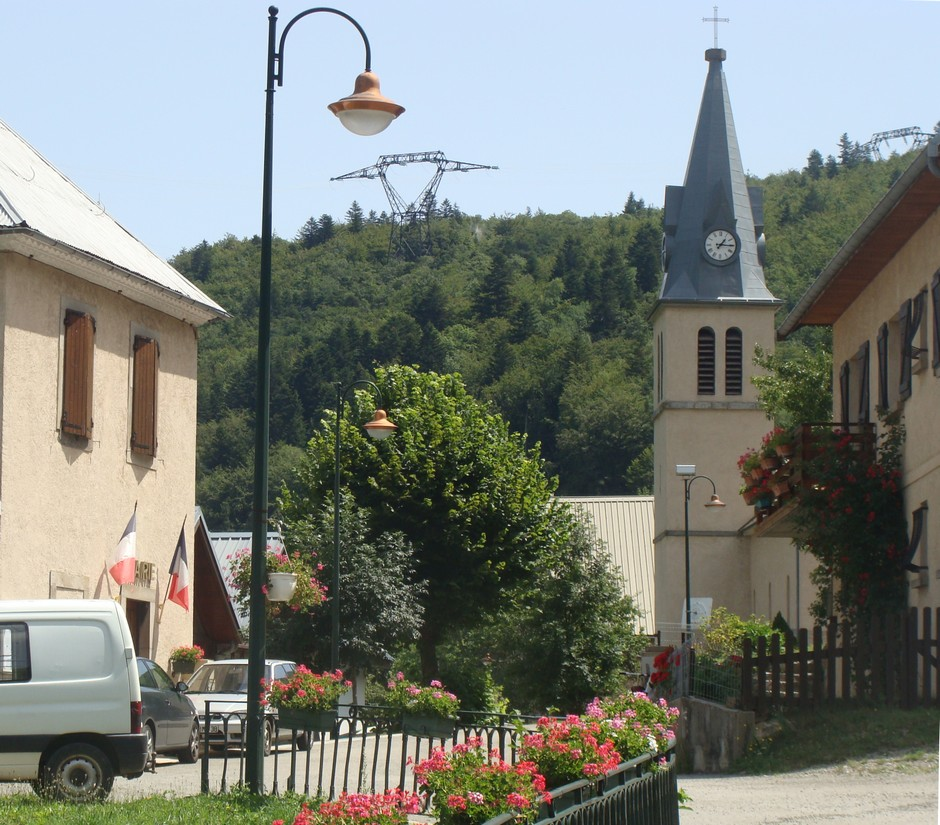
- The village; left is the Town Hall, right is the church
- Location of Beaufin
- Location within France Location within Auvergne-Rhône-Alpes
- Coordinates: 44°47′19″N 5°57′39″E
- Country: France
- Region: Auvergne-Rhône-Alpes
- Department: Isère
- Arrondissement: Grenoble
- Canton: Matheysine-Trièves

Government
  - Mayor (2020–2026): Emmanuel Serre
- Area^{1}: 6 km^{2} (2.3 sq mi)
- Highest elevation: 2,080 m (6,820 ft)
- Lowest elevation: 744 m (2,441 ft)
- Population (2023): 19
  - Density: 3.2/km^{2} (8.2/sq mi)
- Time zone: UTC+01:00 (CET)
  - Summer (DST): UTC+02:00 (CEST)
- INSEE/Postal code: 38031 /38970
- ^{1} French Land Register data, which excludes lakes, ponds, glaciers > 1 km^{2} (0.386 sq mi or 247 acres) and river estuaries.

Beaufin (French pronunciation: [bofɛ̃]) is a commune in the Isère department in the Auvergne-Rhône-Alpes region of south-eastern France.

== Geography ==
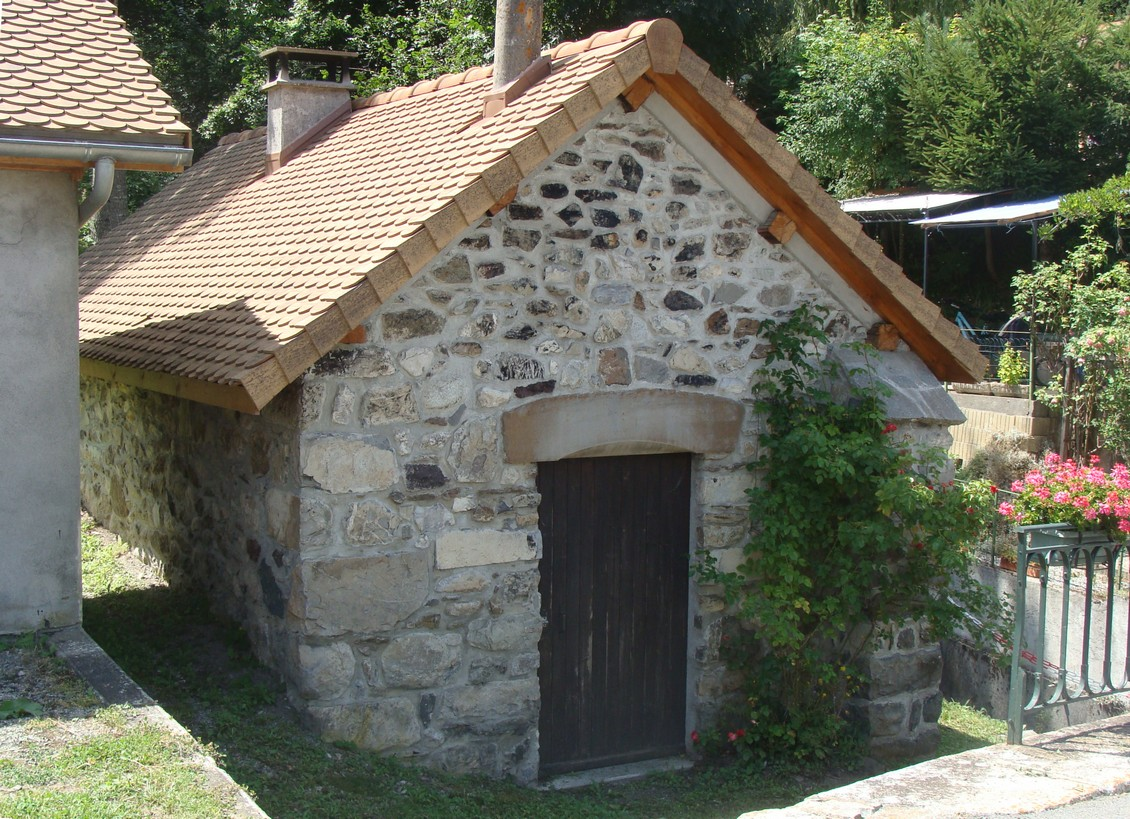
The Communal oven

Beaufin is located some 50 km south by south-east of Grenoble and 25 km north by north-west of Gap. Access to the commune is by the D217 road from Ambel in the north-west which continues east across the river to join the Route nationale N85. The D57L from Le Glaizil in the south-east also passes through the commune and across the river without connecting to the road to the village. The only access to the village is by the D217A which branches off the D217 in the commune and is a dead-end road due to the collapse of a tunnel on the road leading south. The commune has three well-defined areas: in the west and south are the slopes of Mount Faraud with bare rock in the higher parts (over 1600 metres) and forests in their lower part; in the centre is a cultivated plain where the village is located; in the north and east the wooded slopes descend towards the river Drac.

The Drac forms the northern and eastern border of the commune with the upper reaches of the artificial Lac du Sautet to the north of the commune. The Drac is also the departmental boundary with Hautes-Alpes until the south-eastern corner of the commune where the departmental border becomes the southern border of the commune. One small stream flows north from Mount Faraud, through the village and into Lake Sautet.

== Toponymy ==
Beaufin appears as Baufin on the 1750 Cassini Map and as Bausin on the 1790 version.

== Administration ==
List of Successive Mayors

From	To	Name
2001	2003	Alphonse Bonthoux
2003	2026	Emmanuel Serre

== Demography ==
The inhabitants of the commune are known as Beaufinois or Beaufinoises in French.

Historical population

Year	Pop.	±% p.a.
1793	157	—
1821	201	+0.89%
1846	172	−0.62%
1872	171	−0.02%
1901	106	−1.64%
1921	80	−1.40%
1926	48	−9.71%
1931	51	+1.22%
1936	35	−7.25%
1946	44	+2.31%
1954	32	−3.90%

Year	Pop.	±% p.a.
1962	31	−0.40%
1968	29	−1.11%
1975	21	−4.51%
1982	25	+2.52%
1990	27	+0.97%
1999	25	−0.85%
2007	24	−0.51%
2012	22	−1.73%
2017	20	−1.89%
2023	19	−0.85%

Source: EHESS and INSEE

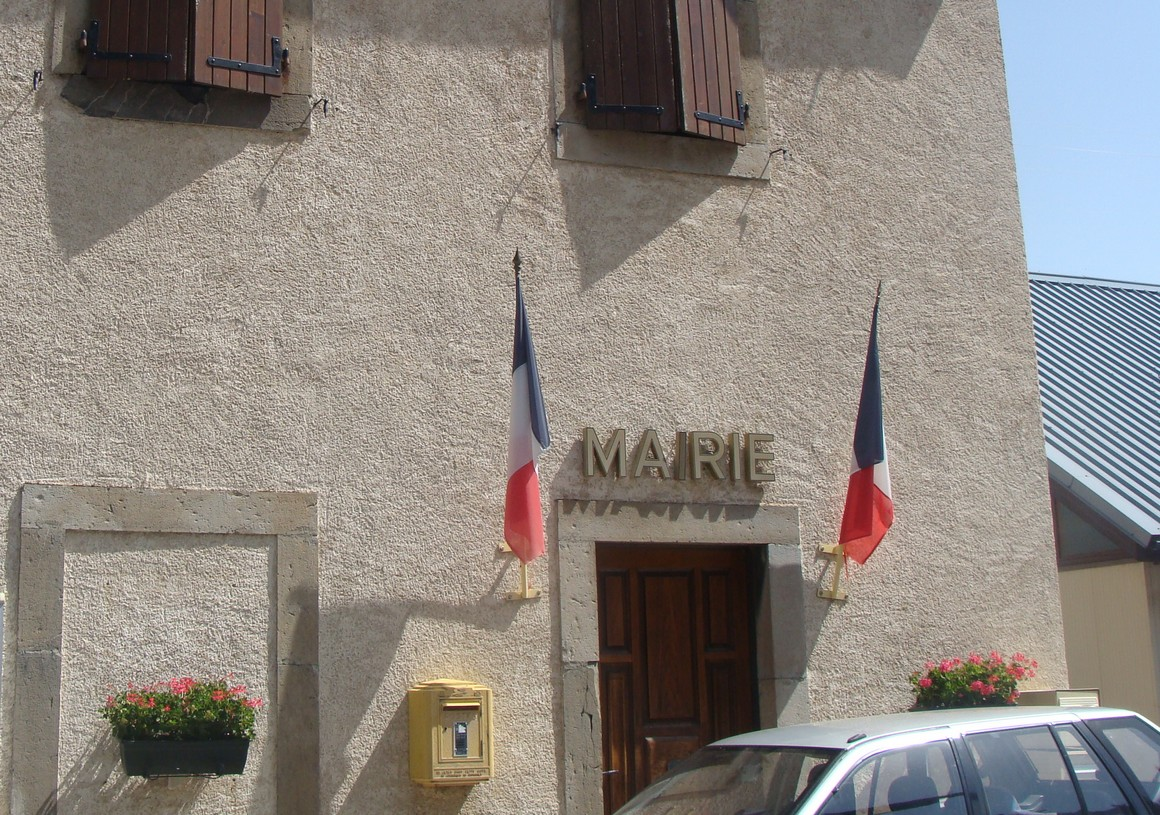
The Town Hall

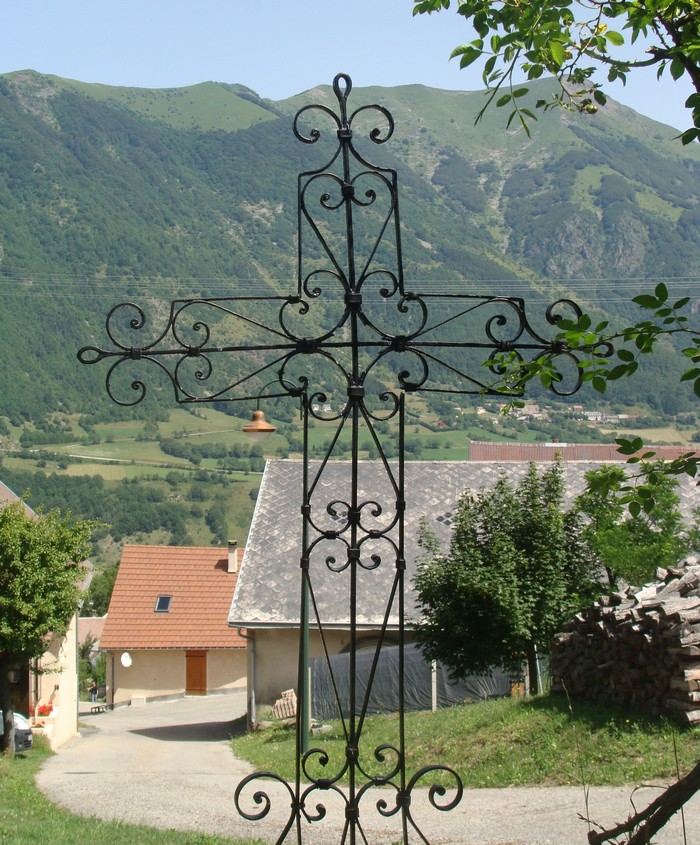
An Iron wayside cross

== Sites and Monuments ==
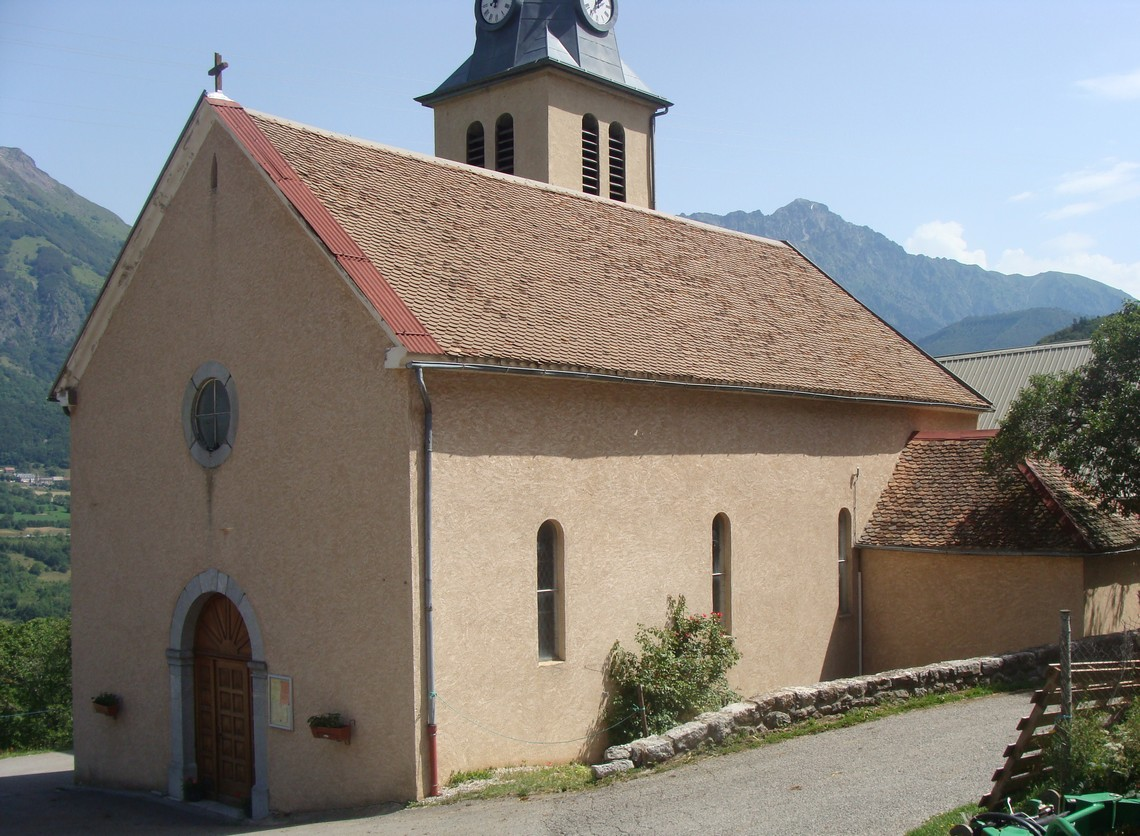
The Church

- A Church from the 19th century with a unique nave, some marble in the interior (the altar, a foot stoup, a baptismal font)
- Remains of a castle from the early 15th century
- Red Rock lava flows.

== See also ==
- Communes of the Isère department
