= Saint-Arey =

- Commune
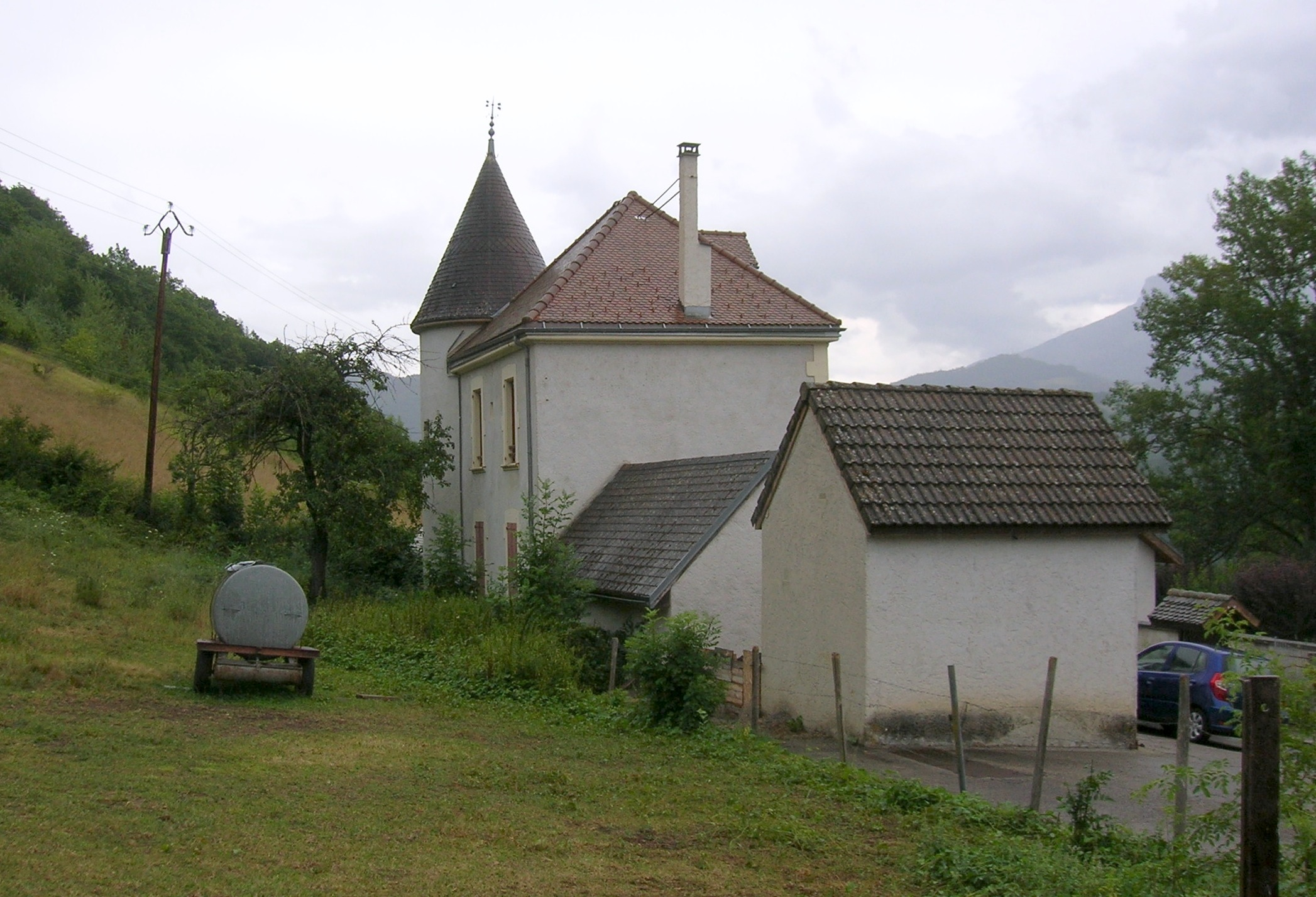
- The town hall of Saint-Arey
- Location of Saint-Arey
- Location within France Location within Auvergne-Rhône-Alpes
- Coordinates: 44°52′22″N 5°44′04″E
- Country: France
- Region: Auvergne-Rhône-Alpes
- Department: Isère
- Arrondissement: Grenoble
- Canton: Matheysine-Trièves

Government
  - Mayor (2020–2026): Anne Stutz
- Area^{1}: 7 km^{2} (2.7 sq mi)
- Elevation: 658 m (2,159 ft)
- Highest elevation: 1,483 m (4,865 ft)
- Lowest elevation: 487 m (1,598 ft)
- Population (2023): 71
  - Density: 10/km^{2} (26/sq mi)
- Time zone: UTC+01:00 (CET)
  - Summer (DST): UTC+02:00 (CEST)
- INSEE/Postal code: 38361 /38350
- ^{1} French Land Register data, which excludes lakes, ponds, glaciers > 1 km^{2} (0.386 sq mi or 247 acres) and river estuaries.

Saint-Arey (French pronunciation: [sɛ̃.t‿aʁɛ]) is a commune in the Isère department in southeastern France.

== Population ==
Historical population
| Year | Pop. | ±% p.a. |
|---|---|---|
| 1968 | 69 | — |
| 1975 | 55 | −3.19% |
| 1982 | 57 | +0.51% |
| 1990 | 53 | −0.91% |
| 1999 | 57 | +0.81% |
| 2007 | 78 | +4.00% |
| 2012 | 85 | +1.73% |
| 2017 | 84 | −0.24% |
| 2023 | 71 | −2.76% |
Source: INSEE

== See also ==
- Communes of the Isère department
