= Canton of Grenoble-4 =

Coordinates: 45.18°N 5.72°E

The canton of Grenoble-4 is an administrative division of the Isère department, eastern France. Its borders were modified at the French canton reorganisation which came into effect in March 2015. Its seat is in Grenoble.

It consists of the following communes:

1. Grenoble (partly)
