= Notre-Dame-de-Mésage =

- Commune
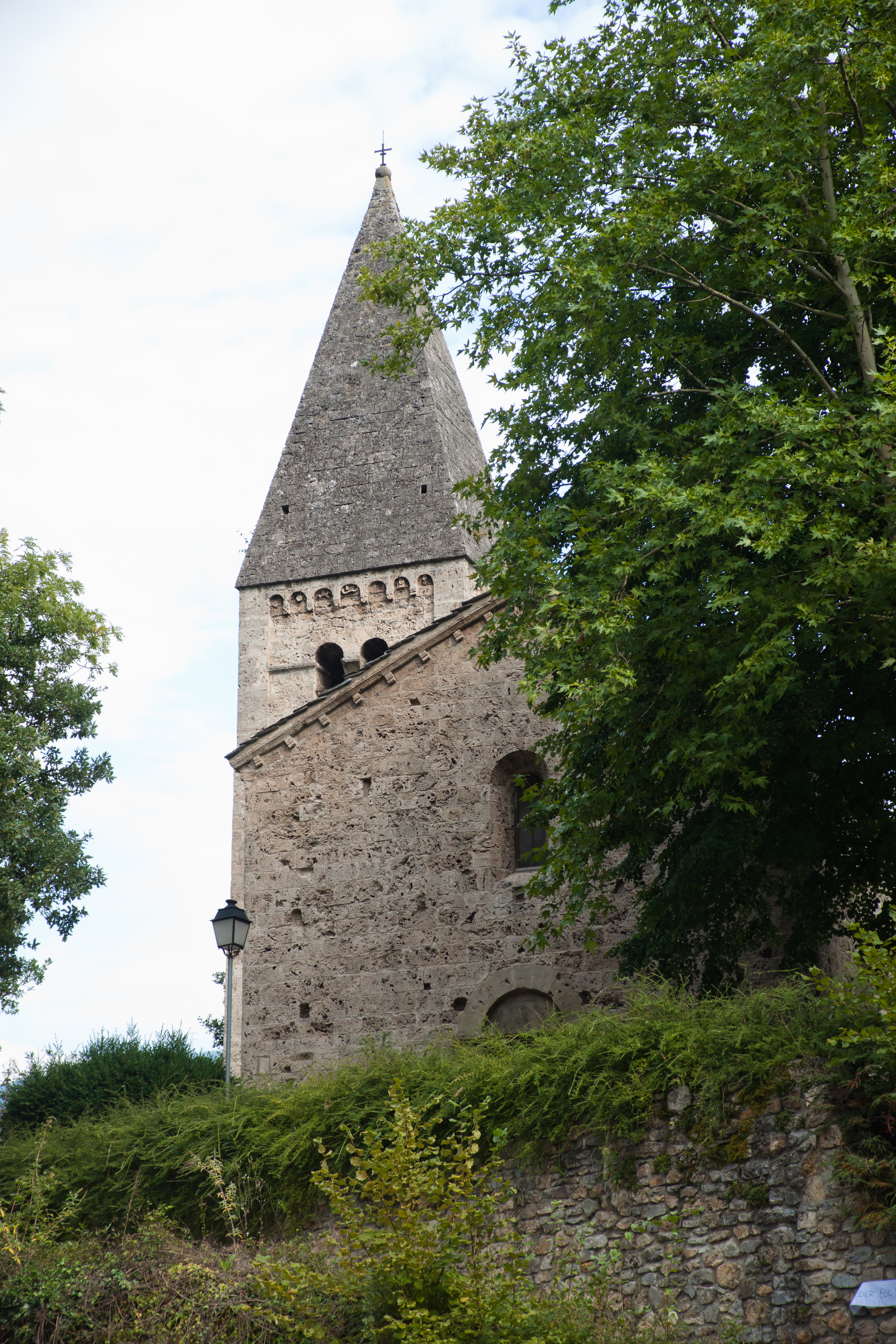
- The chapel of Saint-Firmin
- Location of Notre-Dame-de-Mésage
- Location within France Location within Auvergne-Rhône-Alpes
- Coordinates: 45°04′16″N 5°45′23″E
- Country: France
- Region: Auvergne-Rhône-Alpes
- Department: Isère
- Arrondissement: Grenoble
- Canton: Oisans-Romanche
- Intercommunality: Grenoble-Alpes Métropole

Government
  - Mayor (2020–2026): Jérôme Buisson
- Area^{1}: 4.53 km^{2} (1.75 sq mi)
- Highest elevation: 1,276 m (4,186 ft)
- Lowest elevation: 270 m (890 ft)
- Population (2023): 1,129
  - Density: 249/km^{2} (645/sq mi)
- Time zone: UTC+01:00 (CET)
  - Summer (DST): UTC+02:00 (CEST)
- INSEE/Postal code: 38279 /38220
- ^{1} French Land Register data, which excludes lakes, ponds, glaciers > 1 km^{2} (0.386 sq mi or 247 acres) and river estuaries.

Notre-Dame-de-Mésage (French pronunciation: [nɔtʁ dam də mezaʒ]) is a commune in the Isère département in southeastern France.

== Population ==
Historical population
Year	Pop.	±% p.a.
1968	240	—
1975	273	+1.86%
1982	928	+19.10%
1990	1,297	+4.27%
1999	1,203	−0.83%
2007	1,215	+0.12%
2012	1,203	−0.20%
2017	1,147	−0.95%
2023	1,129	−0.26%
Source: INSEE

== See also ==
- Communes of the Isère department
