= Route Napoléon =

Route taken by Napoleon in 1815

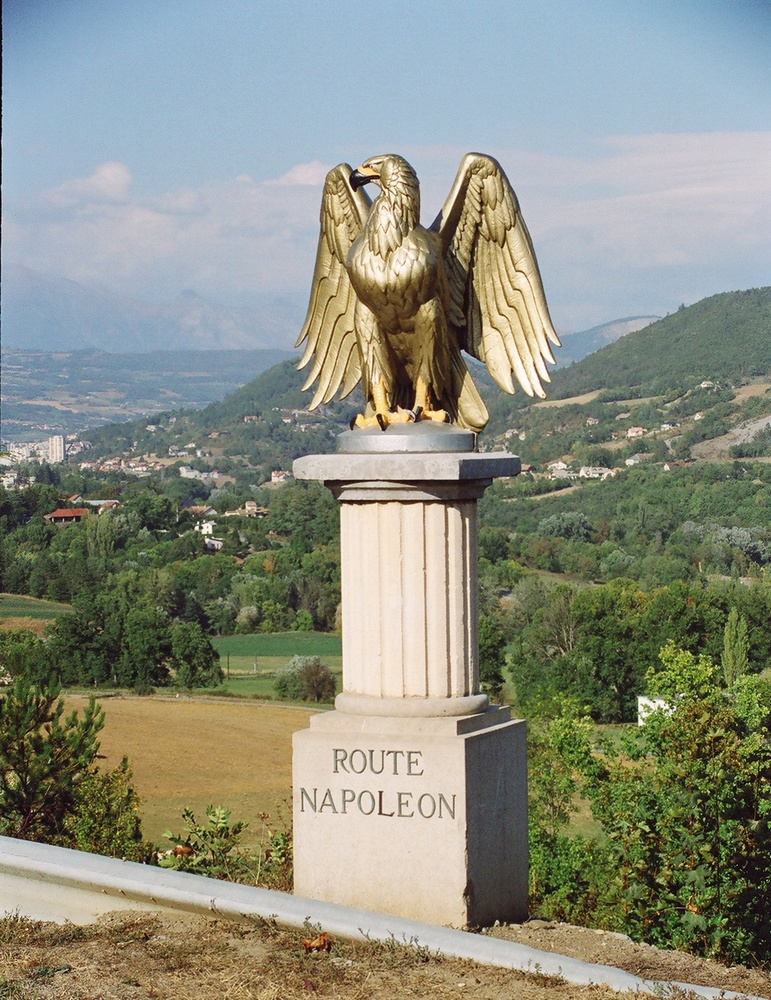
Gilded eagle marker along the Route Napoléon, on the southern approach to Gap, Hautes-Alpes

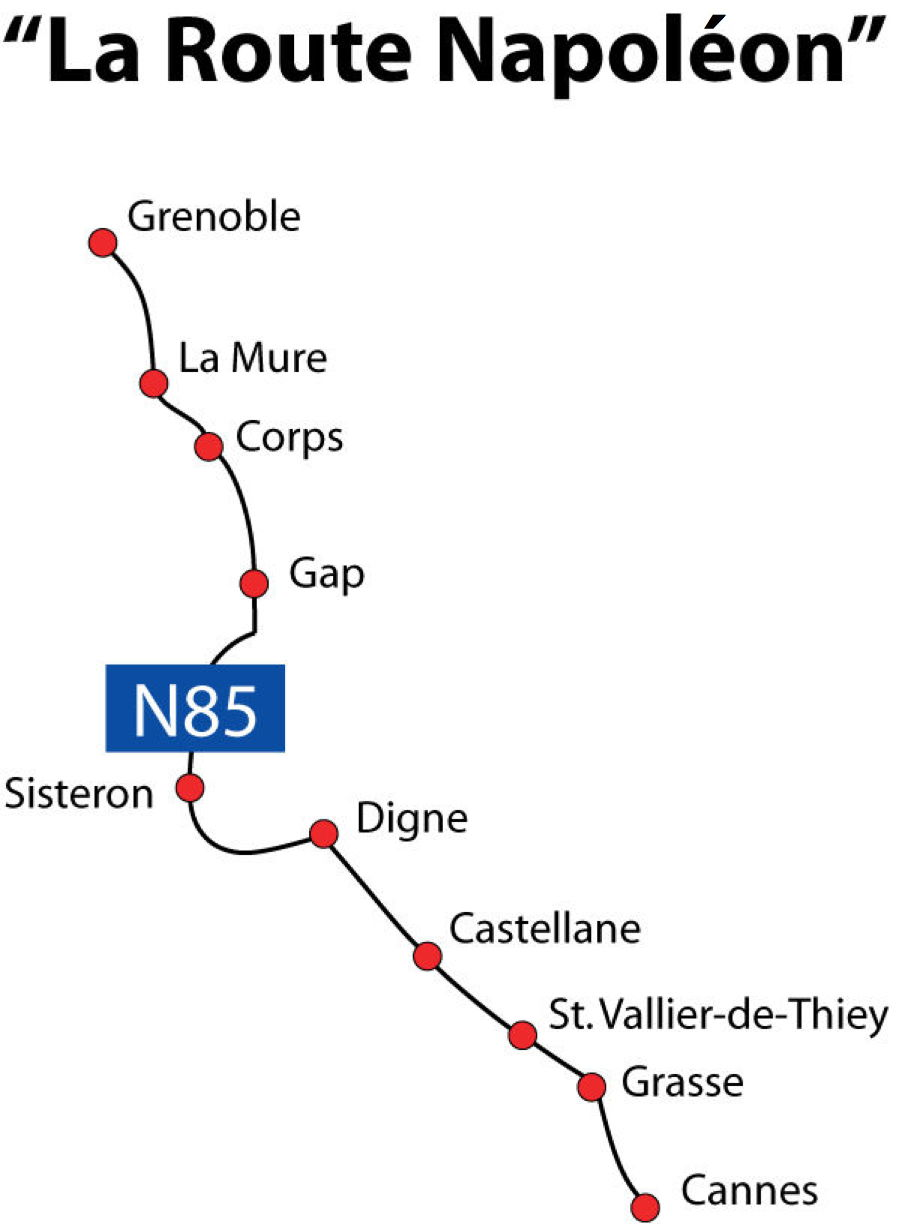
Map of the Route Napoléon

The Route Napoléon is the route taken by Napoleon I from Golfe-Juan (near Cannes) to Grenoble on his return from Elba in 1815. It is now concurrent with sections of route N85, and Routes D1085, D4085, and D6085.

The route begins at Golfe-Juan, where Napoleon disembarked on 1 March 1815, beginning the Hundred Days that ended at Waterloo. Napoleon led around 1,000 men, horses and equipment, and completed the journey in less than seven days, reaching Grenoble on 7 March 1815. From there he proceeded to Paris, where, as Balzac wrote, 'France gave herself to Napoleon, just as a pretty girl abandons herself to a Lancer'.

The Route was inaugurated in 1932 and meanders from the French Riviera north-northwest along the foothills of the Alps. Among the highlights of the route are the towns of Grasse, Castellane and Sisteron, and the Gorges du Verdon, which can be reached with a slight diversion from the main route.

== Route ==
From south to north:

- Antibes
- Grasse
- Saint-Vallier-de-Thiey
- Castellane
- Digne
- Sisteron
- Gap
- Col Bayard (1,246 m)
- Corps
- La Mure
- Laffrey
- Grenoble

== Gallery ==
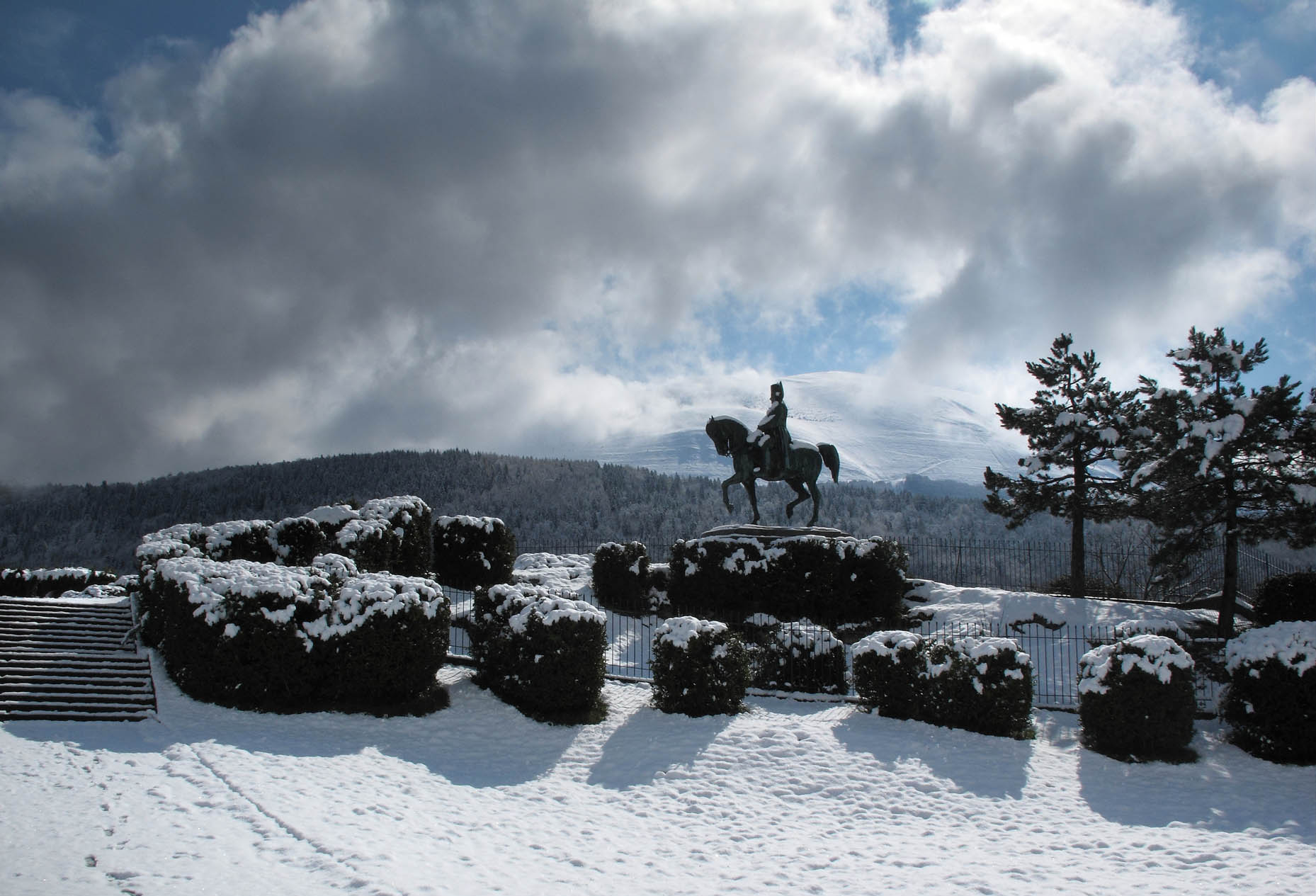
Route Napoleon, Prairie de la Rencontre, Laffrey

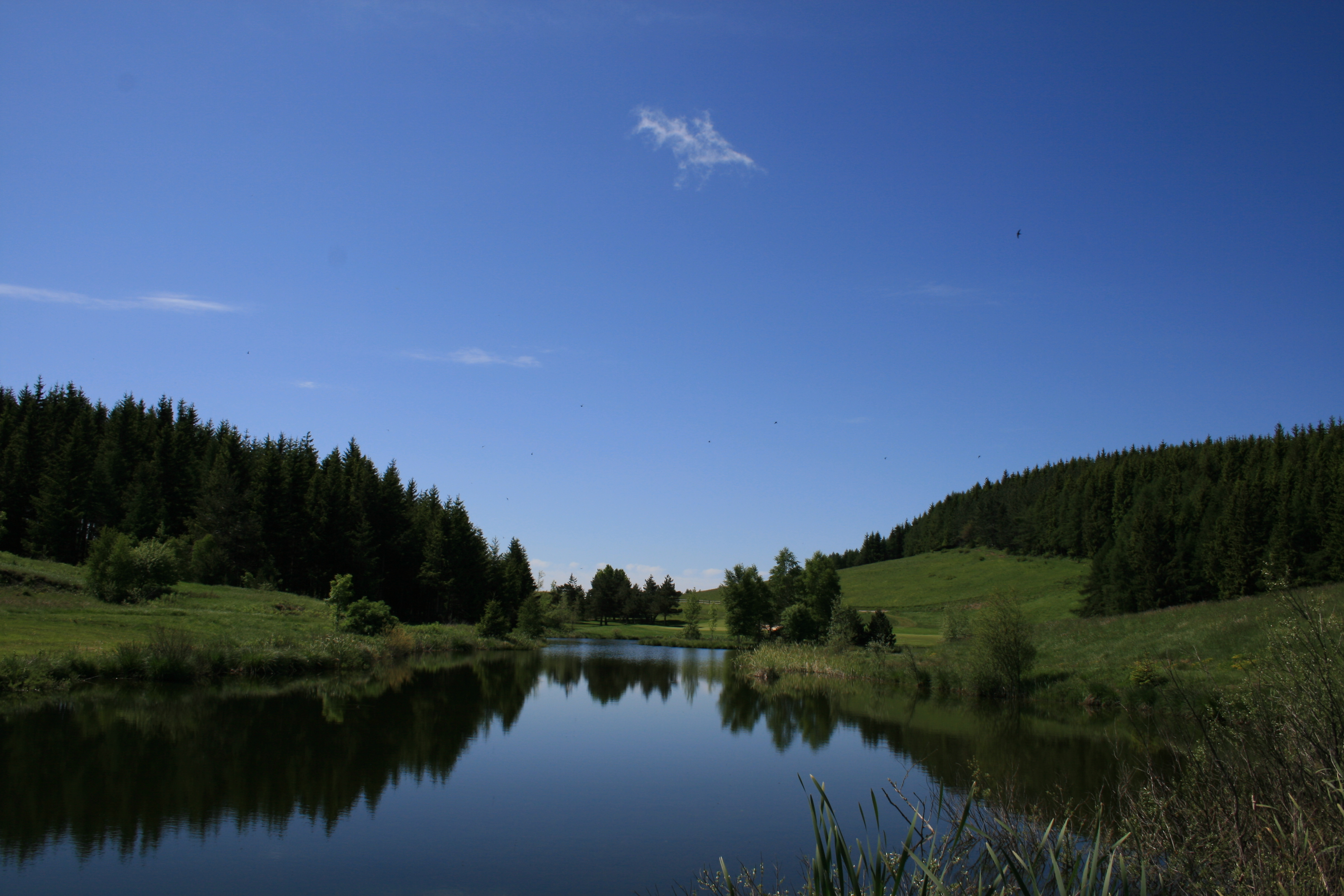
Lake on the Col Bayard
