= Prunières, Isère =

Prunières
- Commune
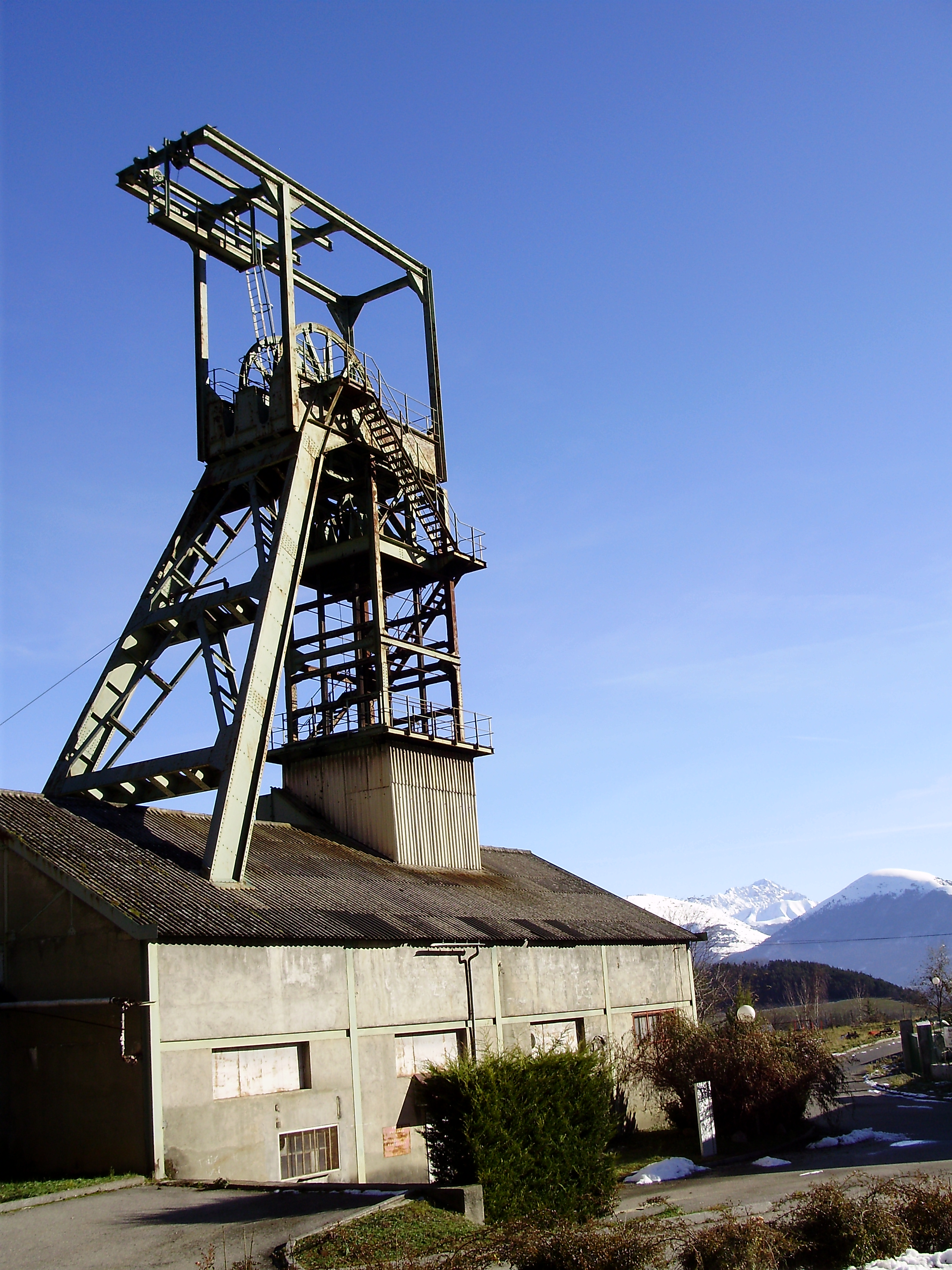
- The Rioux mine
- Location of Prunières
- Location within France Location within Auvergne-Rhône-Alpes
- Coordinates: 44°53′38″N 5°45′49″E
- Country: France
- Region: Auvergne-Rhône-Alpes
- Department: Isère
- Arrondissement: Grenoble
- Canton: Matheysine-Trièves

Government
  - Mayor (2020–2026): Michel Toscan
- Area^{1}: 8 km^{2} (3.1 sq mi)
- Elevation: 820 m (2,690 ft)
- Highest elevation: 1,617 m (5,305 ft)
- Lowest elevation: 592 m (1,942 ft)
- Population (2023): 381
  - Density: 48/km^{2} (120/sq mi)
- Time zone: UTC+01:00 (CET)
  - Summer (DST): UTC+02:00 (CEST)
- INSEE/Postal code: 38326 /38350
- ^{1} French Land Register data, which excludes lakes, ponds, glaciers > 1 km^{2} (0.386 sq mi or 247 acres) and river estuaries.

Prunières (French pronunciation: [pʁynjɛʁ]) is a commune in the Isère department in southeastern France.

== Population ==
Historical population
Year	Pop.	±% p.a.
1968	331	—
1975	268	−2.97%
1982	263	−0.27%
1990	299	+1.62%
1999	312	+0.47%
2007	372	+2.22%
2012	378	+0.32%
2017	355	−1.25%
2023	381	+1.18%
Source: INSEE

== See also ==
- Communes of the Isère department
