= Bastille (disambiguation) =

The Bastille was a prison in France.

Bastille may also refer to:

== Places and structures ==
- Bastille (fortification), a form of urban fortification
- In Paris:
  - Bastille station (Paris Metro), a rapid transit station in Paris
  - Gare de la Bastille, a former railway station in Paris
  - Opéra Bastille, an opera house in Paris
  - Place de la Bastille, a square in Paris where the Bastille prison once stood
- Bastille (Grenoble), a fortress in Grenoble, France
- Bastille Peak, a mountain in Nunavut, Canada
- Beuzeville-la-Bastille, a commune in Basse-Normandie, France

== People ==
- Guillaume Bastille, a Canadian short-track speed skater

== Arts and entertainment ==
- Bastille (band), a British indie band
- Bastille (film), a Dutch film
- Siege of the Bastille (Cholat), a painting by Claude Cholat

== History ==
- Storming of the Bastille, an event in the French Revolution
- Governor of the Bastille, a list of commanders of the Bastille
- Operation Bastille, an operation in Iraq

== Other uses ==
- Grenoble-Bastille cable car, a French cable car

== See also ==
- Bastille Day (disambiguation)
