= Bastille Day (disambiguation) =

Bastille Day is the common name for the French National Day, celebrated on 14 July each year.

Bastille Day may also refer to:

- Bastille Day (1933 film), a French romantic comedy by René Clair
- Bastille Day (2016 film), a film starring Idris Elba
- "Bastille Day" (Battlestar Galactica), an episode of Battlestar Galactica
- "Bastille Day" (song), a song by Rush

== See also ==
- Bastille (disambiguation)
- Bastille Day attack, a list of attacks
- Bastille Day solar storm, a solar storm on July 14, 2000
- Bastille Day Military Parade, a French military parade held on Bastille Day
