= Bastille (Grenoble) =

Fortress overlooking Grenoble, France

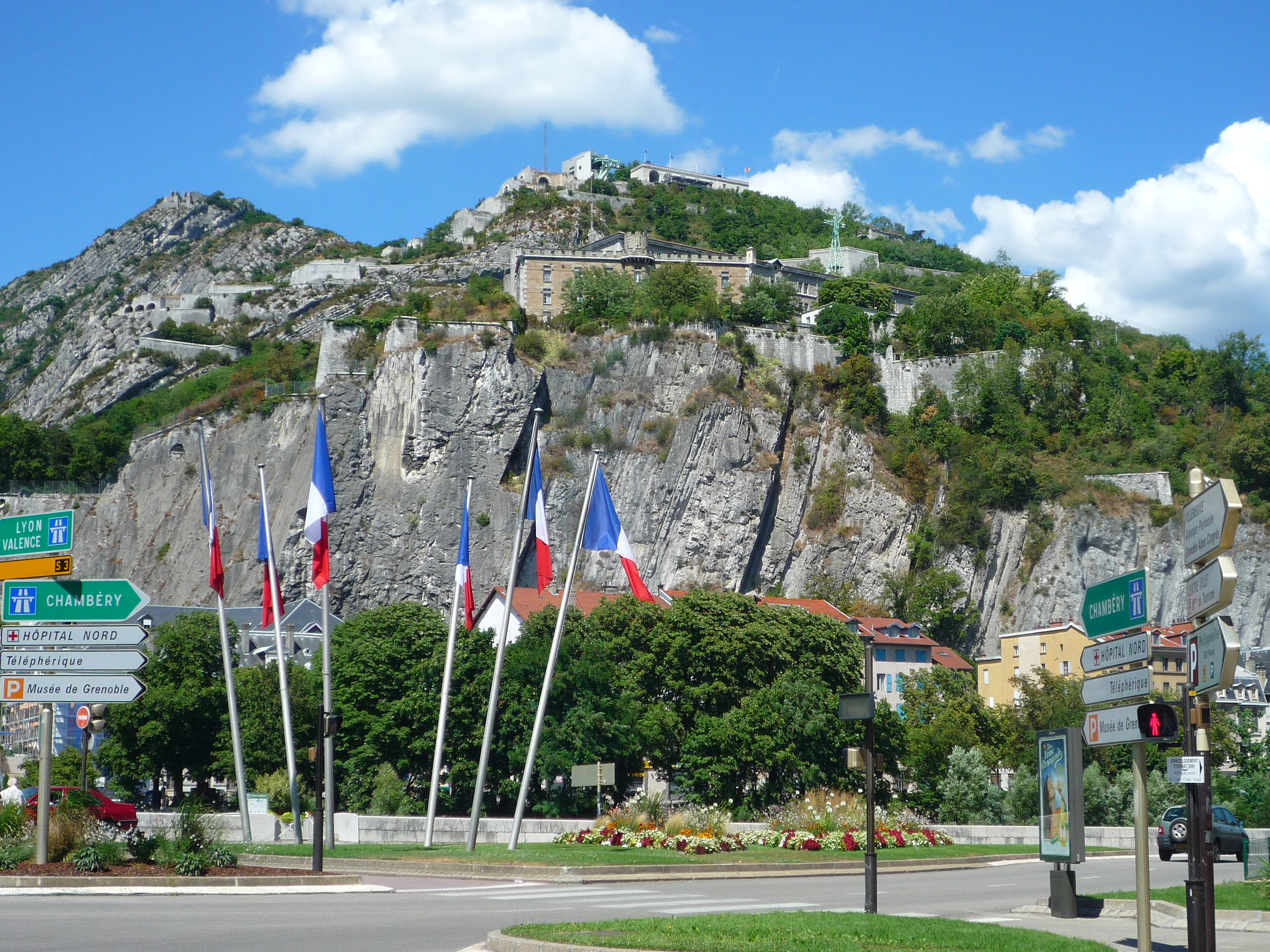
Hill and fortress of the Bastille

The Bastille is a fortress culminating at 476 m (1,561ft) above sea level, located at the south end of the Chartreuse Mountains and overlooking the city of Grenoble, France. The Bastille, which also gives its name to the hill, is the main tourist site of the Grenoble area, with 600,000 visitors per year.

== Geography ==
The fortress lies on the final promontory of Mount Rachais, a narrow mountain that is the most southerly of the Chartreuse range.

The plateau of the fortress' main fortifications is situated 264 metres above a singularly flat valley floor which is glacial in origin. The melting of the Isère glacier approximately 25,000 years ago led to the formation of a vast lake stretching from Voiron to Albertville and which remained for approximately 10,000 years. The filling-in of this lake by alluvial deposits created the perfectly flat valley floors that are in evidence today.

The location was chosen for a fort because it facilitated the surveillance and control of the city of Grenoble, from the 19th century onward, as well as the valleys of the Isère and the Drac, all the while being difficult to attack and overthrow because of the cliffs and steep ground by which it is surrounded.

== History ==
Francis I in 1538 and Charles IX in 1566 both asked that this hill be fortified, but these requests were not acted upon.

=== The Lesdiguières Era ===
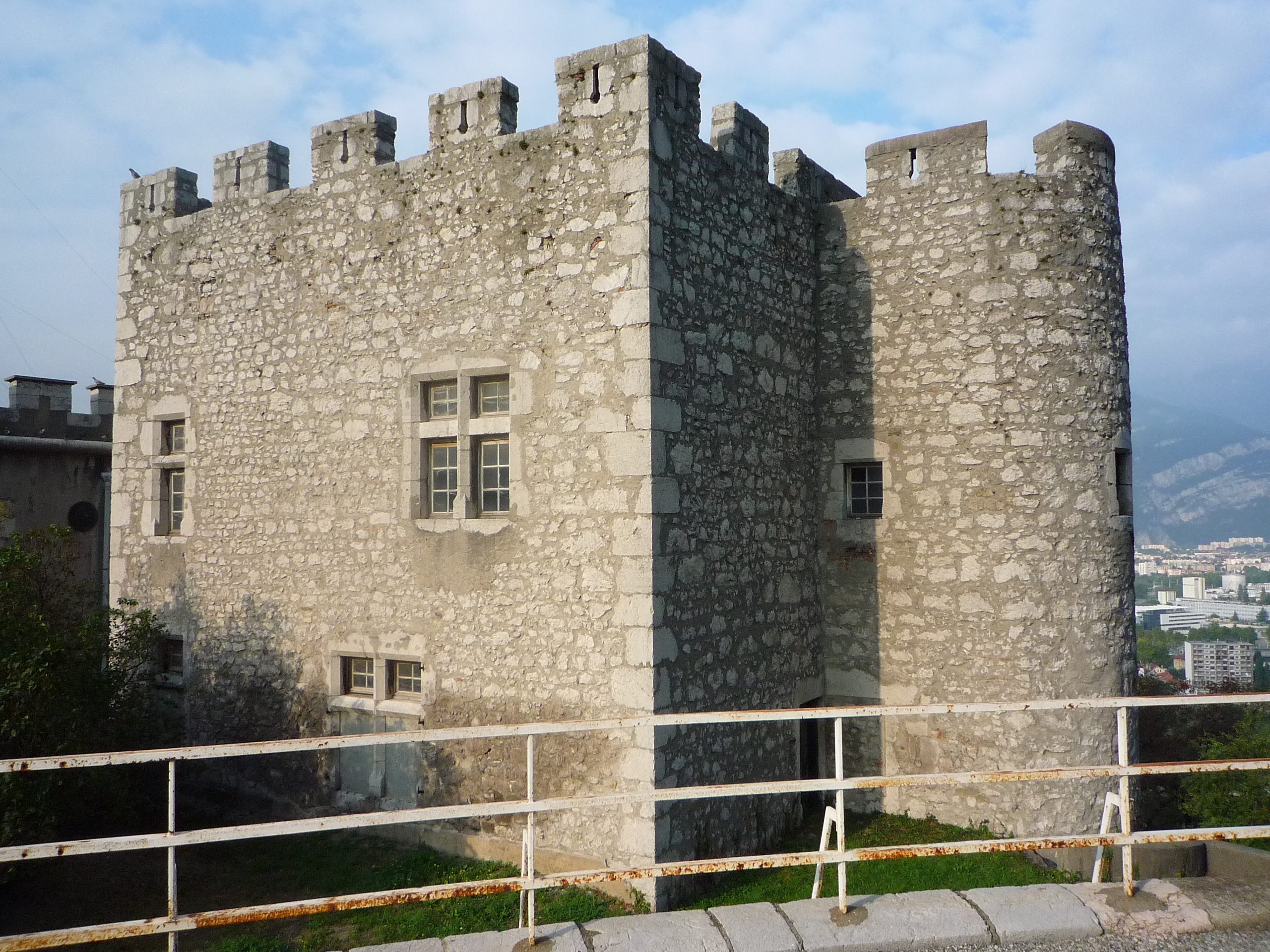
Rabot Citadel, 15th century

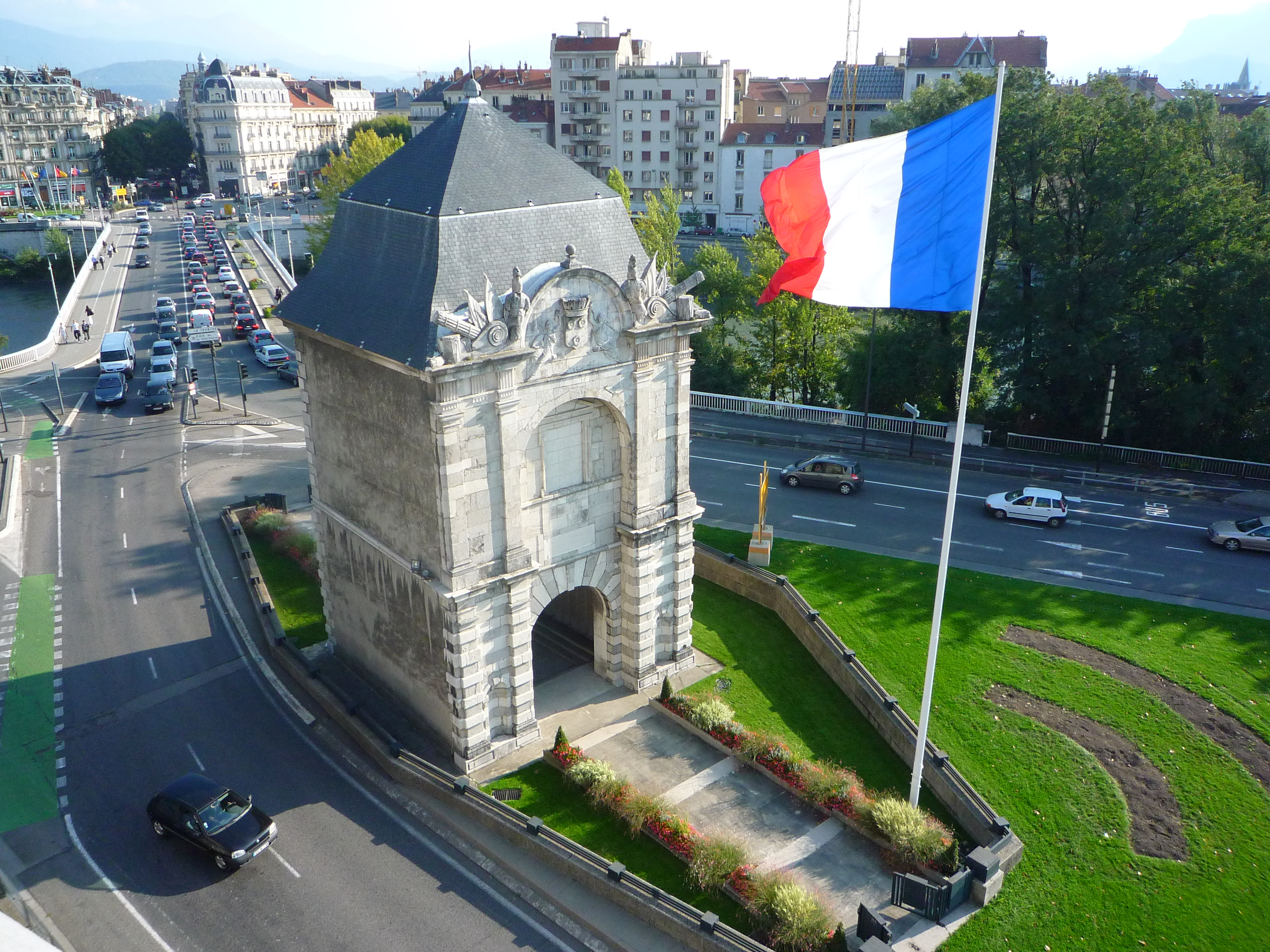
Porte de France (1620)

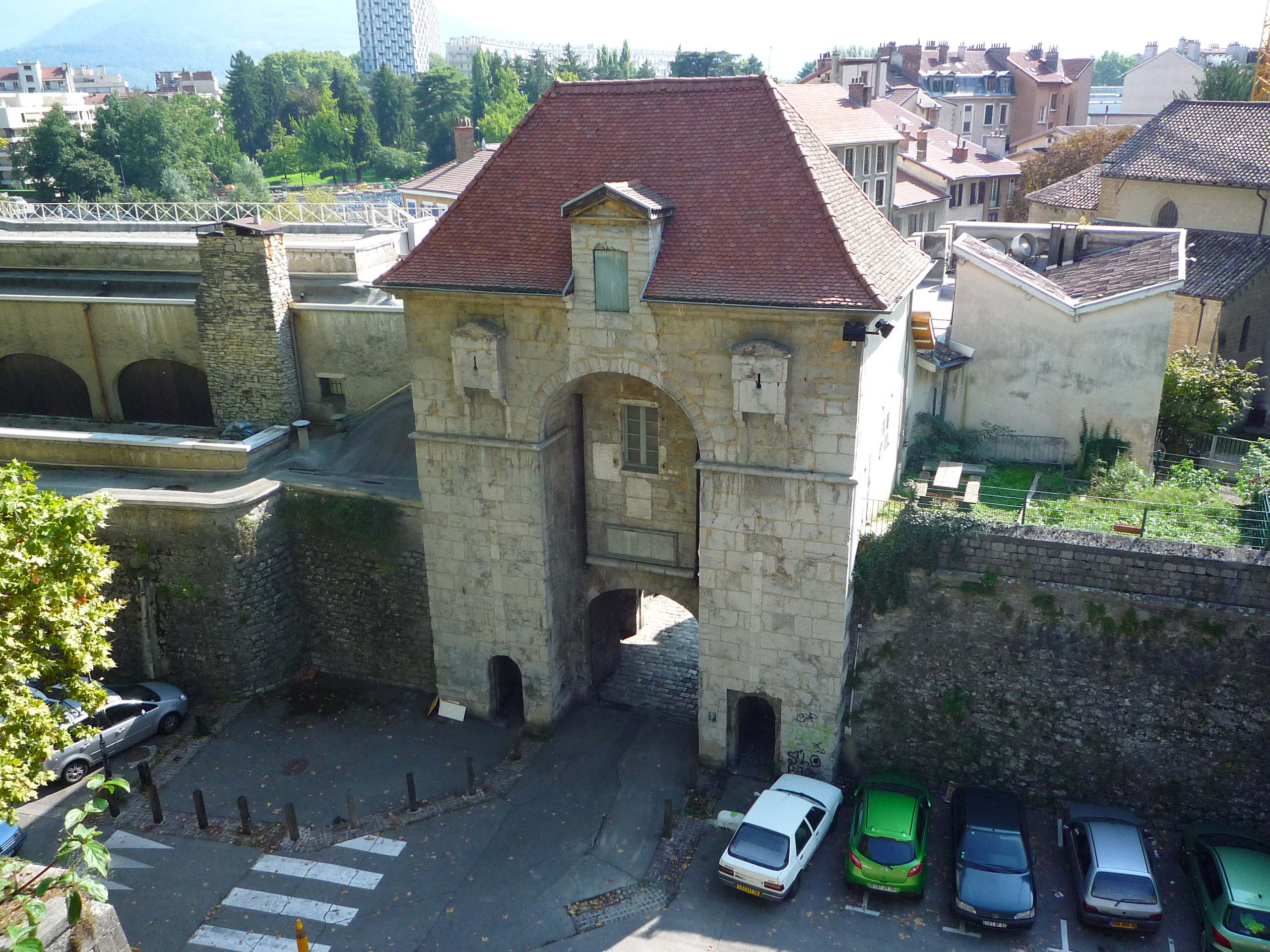
Porte Saint Laurent (1615)

In December 1590, Lesdiguières, (Note: He did not become a duke until 1611.) head of the Huguenots in the Dauphiné, took control of the city of Grenoble from the Roman Catholic side during the eighth and last Wars of Religion. With an army of 1,200 men gathered at Moirans, he marched towards Grenoble, passing through Saint-Martin-le-Vinoux and then over the spur of Mount Rachais called the Rabot, avoiding a fortified stronghold there. (Note: This fortified house dating from the 15th century is thought to be the earliest fortification built on the hill.) A single cannon was positioned on the slopes of Mount Rachais, because this rocky spur was thought to be enough of a natural barrier to deter the advance of hostile forces. But in spite of a permanent state of alert and 24 watch points in the city, Grenoble fell to Lesdiguières after more than three weeks under siege.

In 1591, having become governor of Grenoble, Lesdiguières immediately ordered the construction of two new defensive elements for the city. First, a small fortified citadel around the Tour de l'Isle (a square tower built on the banks of the Isère, which today stands next to the Museum of Grenoble) so as to have a safe place to withdraw to in case the city was attacked. Second, a fortress on the summit of the hill so that no enemy could as he did approach the city from the Chartreuse without being challenged. This fortress, or bastille, which would give its name to the hill, was completed the following year in 1592. Comprising a tower and a series of small bastions, and with a building to lodge the troops, it was encircled by a wall approximately 1.3 metres thick around an area 68 metres long and 50 metres wide.

At the same time as these works were taking place, the Roman city wall, 13 centuries old and ill-adapted to withstand the artillery of the time, was removed. New defensive walls were built, equipped with six bastions and two half-bastions capable of resisting artillery assault. The works encompassed the suburbs that had grown up around the original Roman city walls, thereby increasing the surface area of the city by 21 hectares (52 acres), (Note: The city therefore now had a surface area of 36 hectares.) and were finished by December 1606.

In the first few years Lesdiguières used the Piedmont architect Ercole Negro, then later, from 1611, the royal engineer Jean de Beins. In 1611, after a pause in the works, construction began on the fortifications descending from either side of the Bastille towards two new monumental gates situated at points on the banks of the Isère approximately 1 km apart.

The Porte Saint Laurent upstream on the Savoy side of Grenoble was finished in 1615, and the Porte de France downstream was finished in 1620. A road was for the first time cut in the rocks along the banks of the Isère, which allowed to get from one gate to the other without crossing over the rocky spur by the Montée de Chalemont. These two monumental gates still exist today, but as for the fortifications there remain only the vestiges of three bartizans (Note: Two were reused in the fortifications of the 19th century on the hill and the other can be seen near the Musée de Grenoble.) and a staircase in the form of a tower in the Jardin des Dauphins. These works on the two branches of fortifications were completed in July 1619.

=== The Vauban Era ===
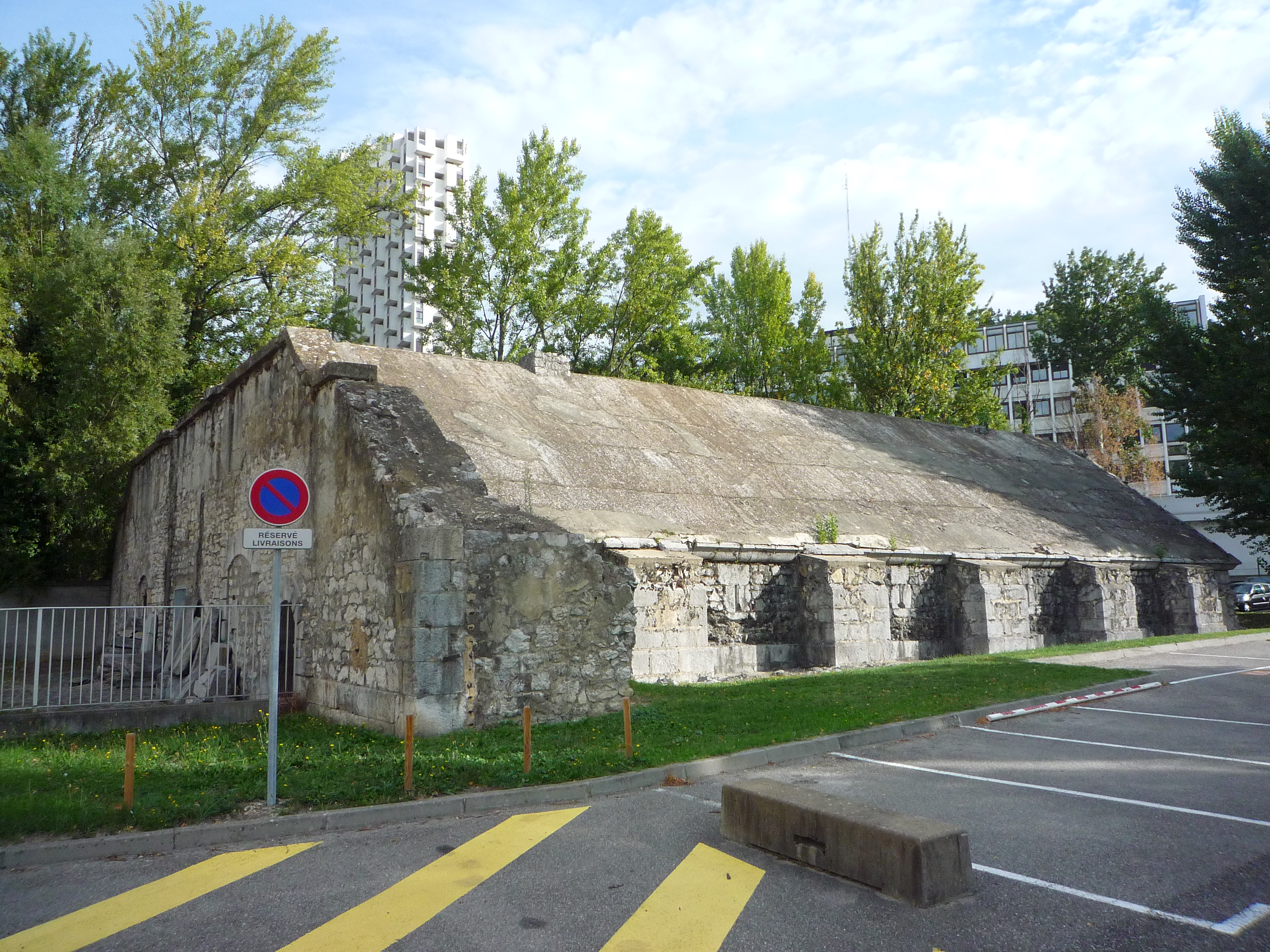
Vauban Powder Magazine in Grenoble

A century after the construction of the Bastille, the military architect Vauban, during his first inspection of the fortifications of the Alps in September 1692, alerted the king, Louis XIV, to the weaknesses of the defences of Grenoble. In his report, he described them as "weak, unfinished, poorly maintained, especially those of the Bastille", which he said were "badly cut, or rather a closed bauble, but without rhyme or reason, occupied by a vintner who is the governor, or at least who has the keys, with twelve cows, eight goats, a mare and a donkey for the whole garrison!".

However, his program of improvements to the fortifications of the Bastille would be ignored, as was his project for the enlargement of the city walls to the south that he proposed during a second visit in July 1700. Only a few terraces and two powder magazines were built. (Note: Only one powder magazine remains today, behind the Hôtel de Police. It is the only evidence of the passage of Vauban in Grenoble.)

During the 18th century, the absence of any threat from the frontier of the Alps led to the lack of interest in any more military projects for Grenoble and the fortifications were no longer maintained.

In addition, due to the extensive flooding of the Isere in September 1733, and December 1741, what monopolized the minds of the authorities were what to implement to overcome these disasters' possible occurrence in the future. Many projects developed by engineers and surveyors between 1741, and 1787, were plans to divert waters of the river south of the city. But due to lack of resources, these projects remained for the approval by the board of Bridges and Roads; they were permanently abandoned in 1790.

=== The Haxo Era ===
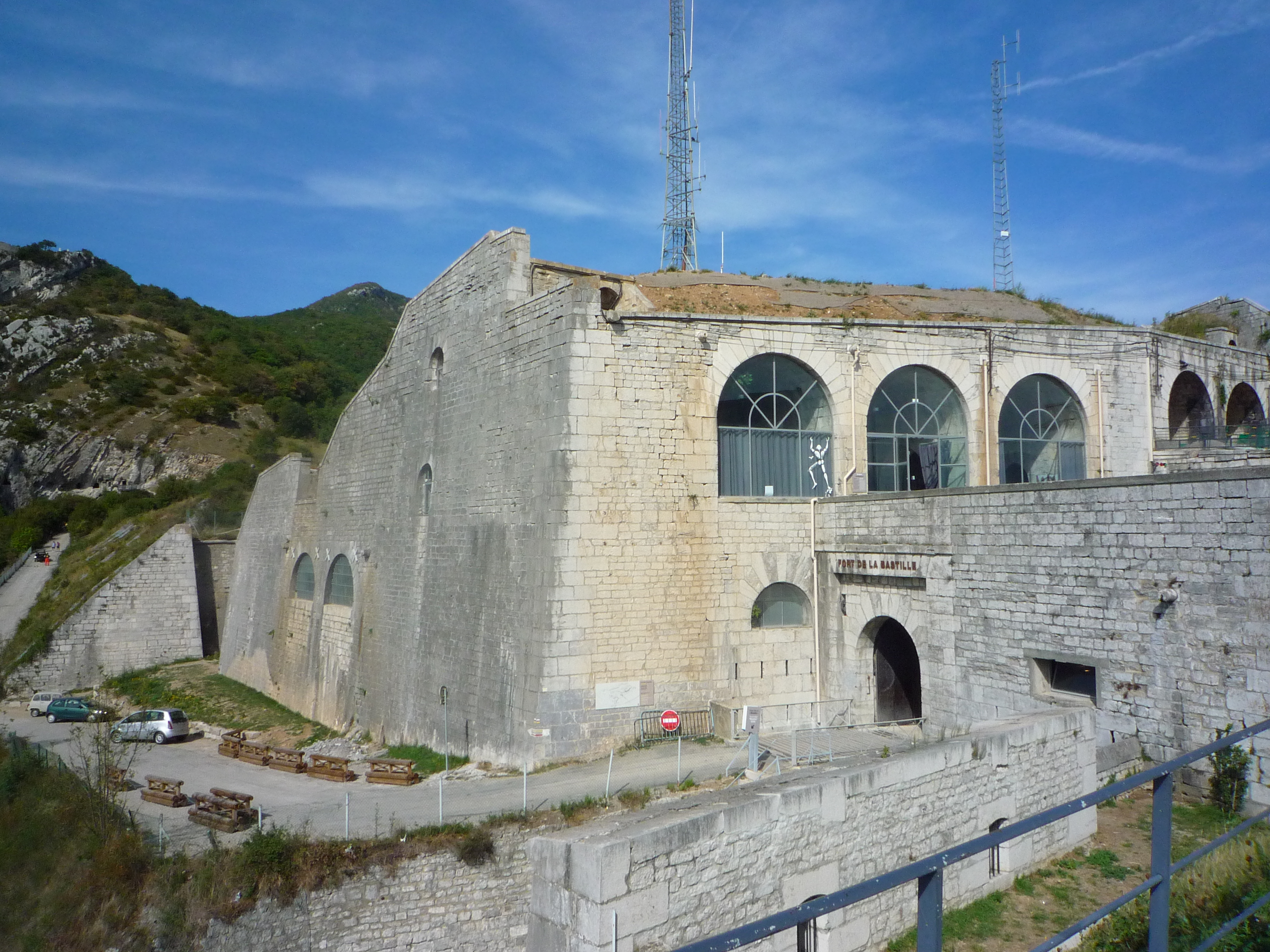
The Bastille (the keep)

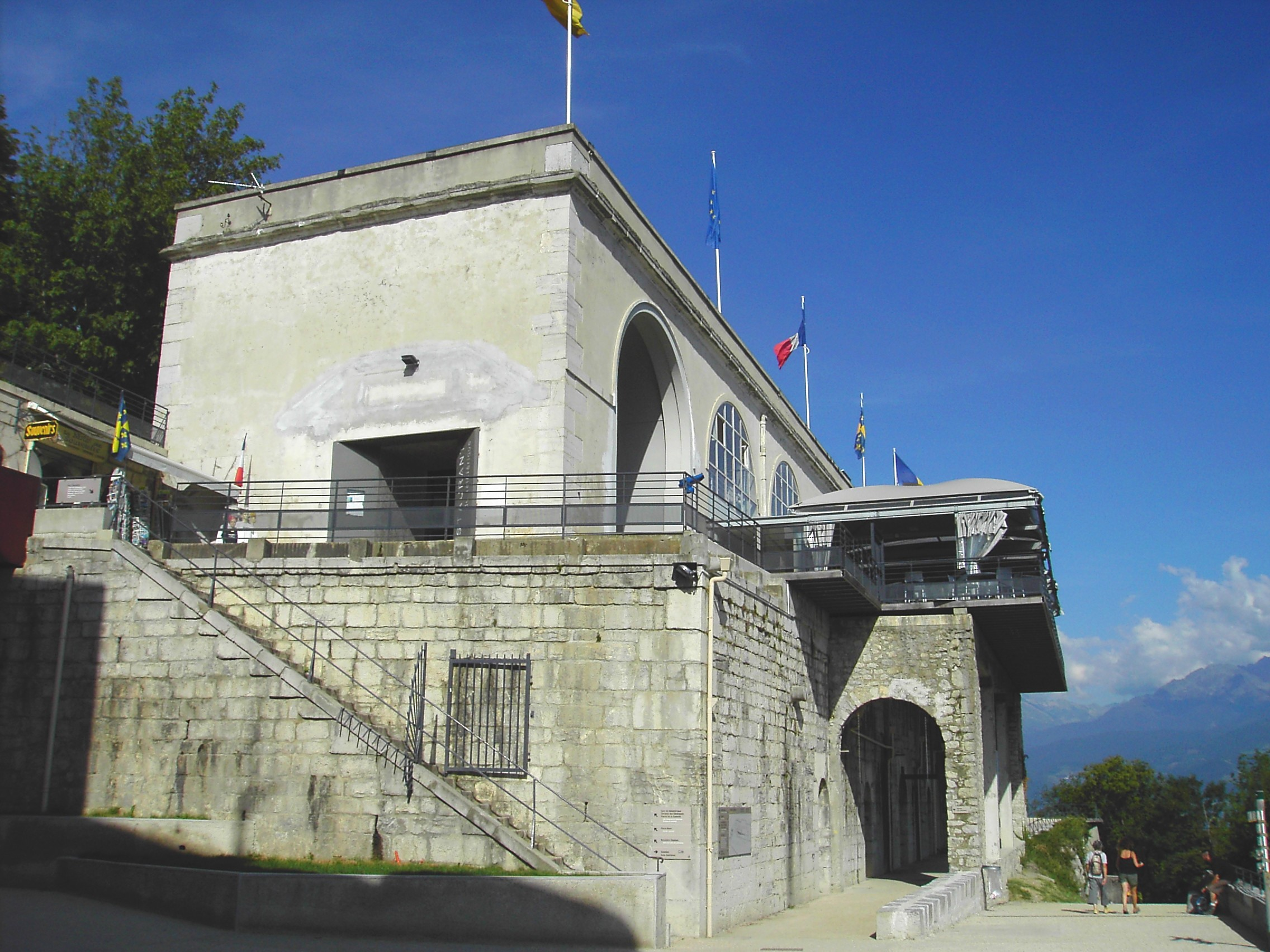
Téléphérique Restaurant

After the rout of Napoleon in Europe, the treaty of Fontainebleau in 1814, and that of Paris the following year put Grenoble back on the frontier opposite the Kingdom of Sardinia. Louis XVIII therefore decided in 1815 to reinforce his military presence on the borders. The following year, he charged General Haxo with the task of improving the fortifications of Grenoble that had become outdated and dilapidated.

After several rough drafts of the plans of the fortress, and much to-ing and fro-ing between Grenoble and the Fortifications Committee in Paris from 1822 to August 1823, the definitive plans for the fort of the Bastille that we can visit today were finally adopted by the committee in its meeting of 29 August 1823. The first works on the site of the new fortress and its new fortifications began on 16 April 1824. The chief of the battalion of Engineers on site was Commander Tournadre.

On the slopes which alternated between rocky points, cliffs and scree, the use of contour maps allowed the precise calculation of position and height. The quarries of the Porte de France below supplied most of the stones which were transported up the hill by mule.

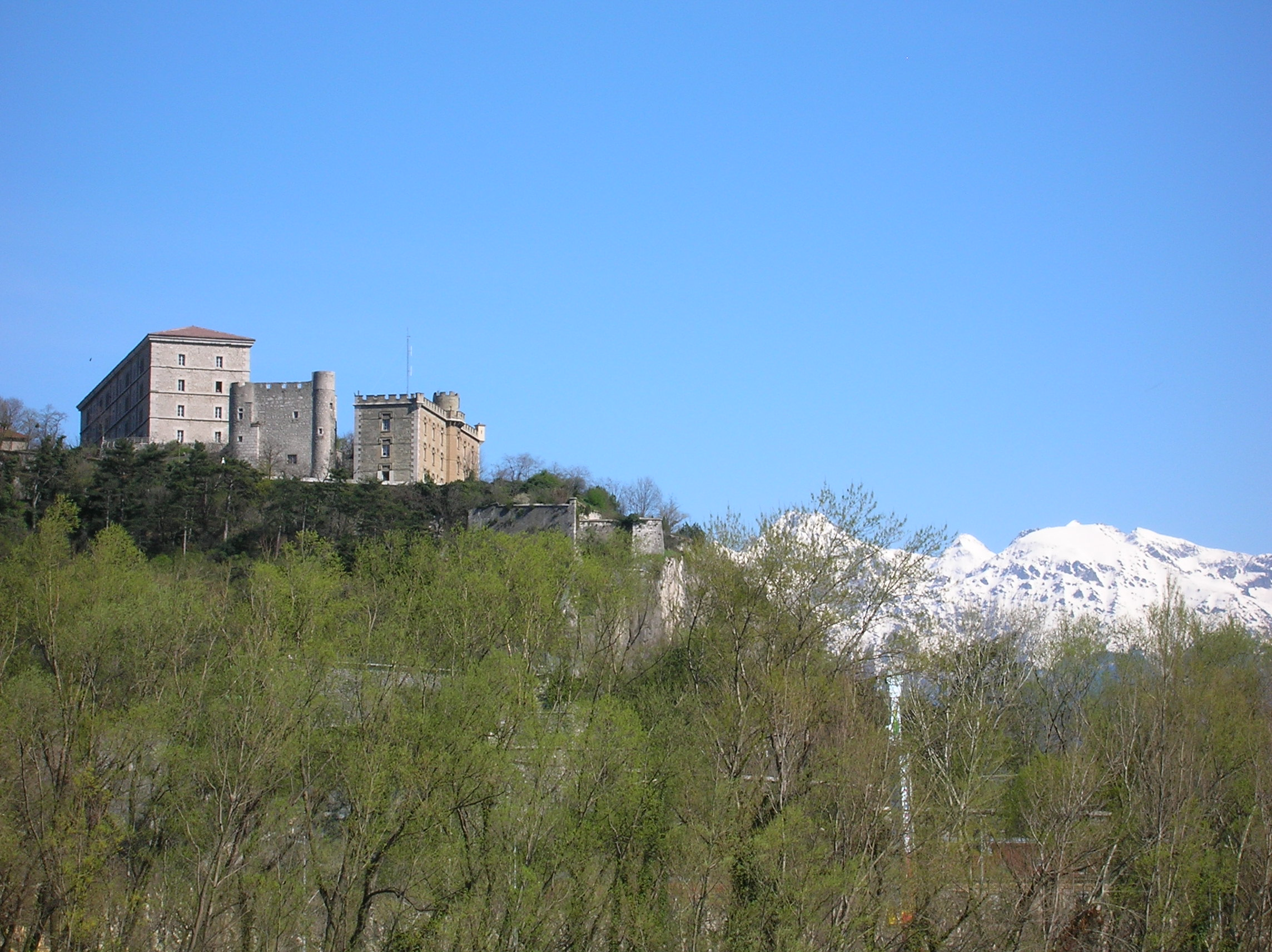
Rabot Fort: 15th and 19th centuries

On the western side of the hill above the Porte de France, (Note: Classed as a historic monument on 18 September 1925.) General Haxo followed the line of the 17th-century, walls and turned them into much larger walls flanked by casemates and bastions. At the top was the keep, or the fort, rebuilt after the demolition of the Bastille of Lesdiguières. Preceded by a moat, the fort is a rectilinear building composed of three floors of casemates in dressed stone, built between 1825, and 1830. Immediately adjacent to it, a barracks was built between 1827, and 1838 (Note: This seems to be a long time but the information comes from a plaque on the wall of the restaurant which states that a plan was presented in 1827.) to lodge 100 men, officers and NCOs. (Note: A detailed report on the capacities and the purposes of the various barracks on the Place de Grenoble show that in 1865 the barracks of the keep contained 3 officers and 98 NCOs.) A century later this building became a restaurant. In 1836, a powder magazine was built below the barracks. In spite of the roof having caved in, it is still visible today from the Vauban Viewpoint (the restaurant terrace).

Still on the western flank, lower down, there is the more modest fort of the Rabot with its citadel, (Note: Named after a dynasty of dauphinois parliamentarians of the 15th and 16th centuries who were owners of the land.) situated within the defensive walls. Built between 1840, and 1847, close to the old Rabot stronghold of the 15th century, (Note: That which Lesdiguières was careful to avoid on the approach to Grenoble. First fortification of the hill, it is still present and intact among the university buildings.) some fifty metres above the city, its role was to lodge up to 900 troops and their officers together with their artillery and a powder magazine far from the likely battlefront. Access is controlled by a monumental gate with a drawbridge. Since 1970, this fort has belonged to Grenoble's university and is used as student residences.

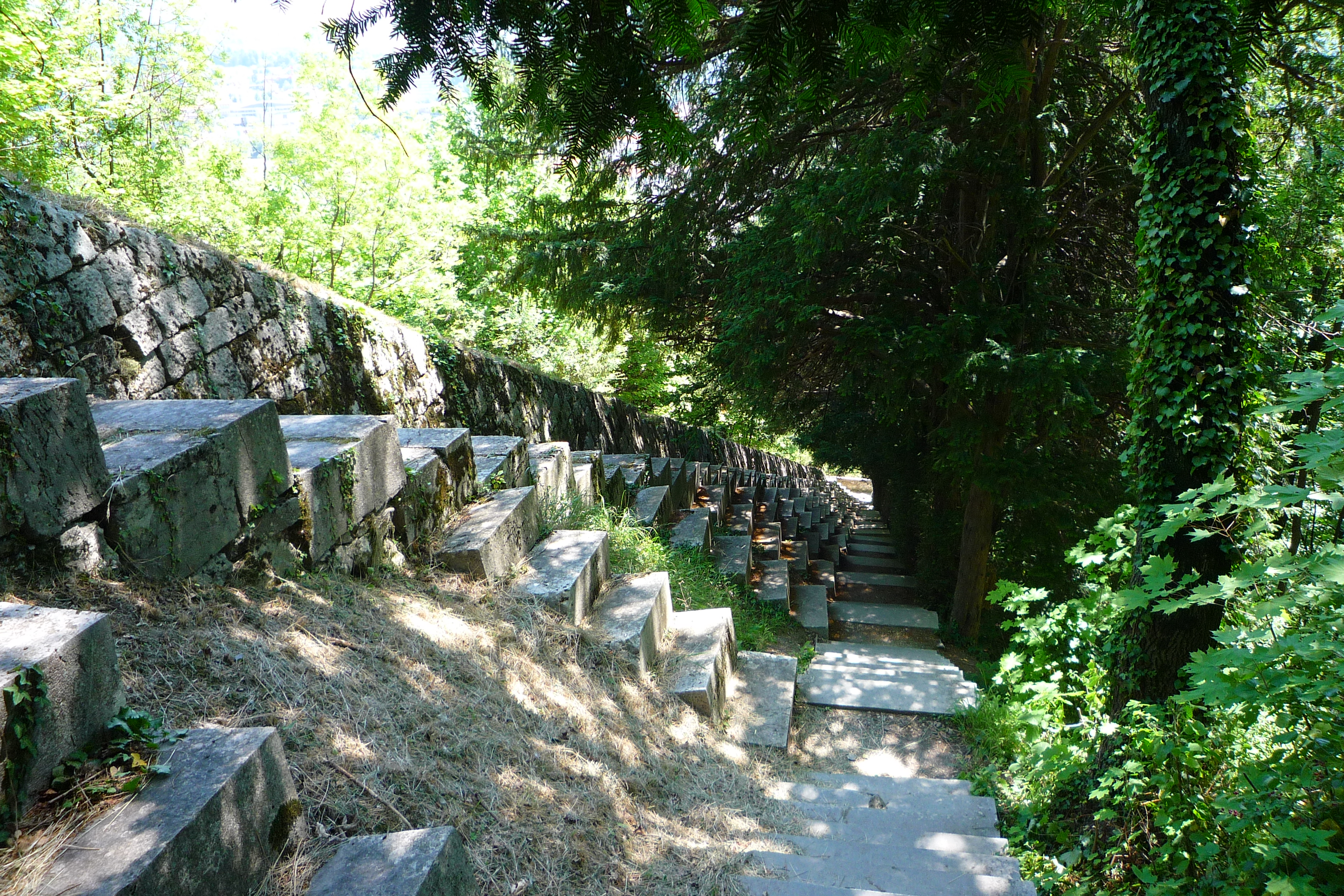
Remarkable steps

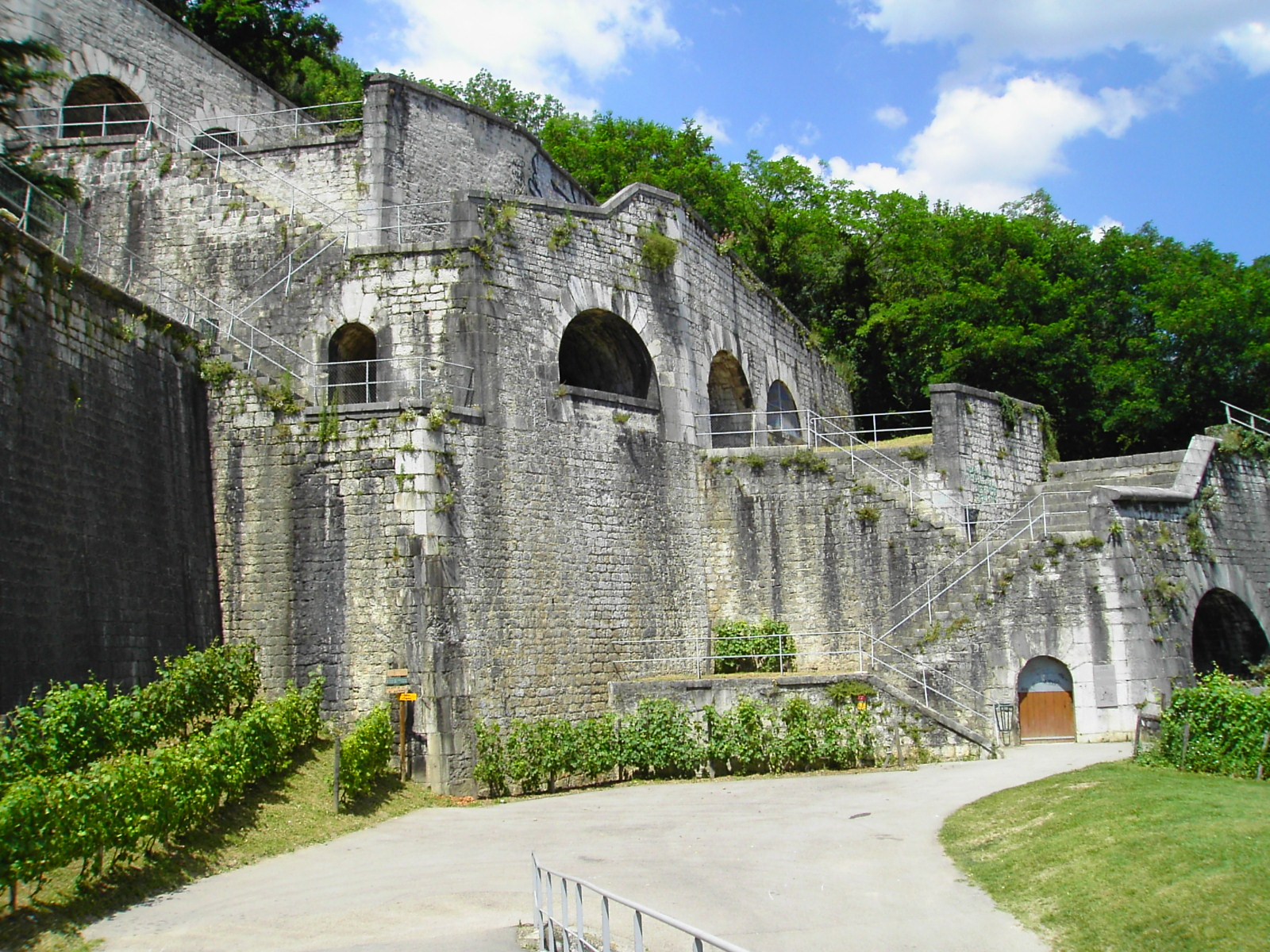
Ramparts close to the Porte Saint Laurent

On the eastern flank, the Porte Saint Laurent (Note: Classed as a historic monument on 16 April 1931.) side of the hill, General Haxo decided on a much more direct route for the walls than the line used by Lesdiguières. Rising above the Porte Saint Laurent are some five terraces of casemates. Then comes the first shorter section of wall linking the Porte Saint Laurent with two floors of mid-level casemates, and a second longer section of wall leads directly from there to the lower casemates of the Bastille. Running alongside each of these two walls is a staircase, with some 80 steps on the lower section and 300 on the upper section. Approximately every ten steps there is a landing, and from there five larger steps lead off at right angles up to the inner side of the wall where there are individual firing positions. With four firing positions between each of the landings this gives 36 positions on the lower section and 120 positions on the upper section.

Finally, to facilitate access and communications from one side of the fort to the other, a curtain wall was built on the upper third of the hill. Some 500 metres long and more or less horizontal, it links the two sides, with bastions along the way.

At the same time that these construction works were beginning on the hill above the right bank of the Isère, the then new mayor of Grenoble, Jean-François Pina, informed the minister of war of his desire to enlarge the city walls on the left bank of the river where the larger part of the city lay. Tournadre, the head of the Engineers on site, opposed the plan because his allocated budget for the work on the hill could not be stretched to cover the enlargement of the rest of the city.

Despite all these improvements, the imbalance between the modern and powerful fortress on the hill and the relatively fragile old-fashioned city walls was too great for it to last very long. Successive mayors Vincent Rivier and Hugues Berriat were successful in obtaining new defences and a roughly rectangular addition of 50 hectares (120 acres) to the south of the city between 1832, and 1836. (Note: This enlargement allowed the creation of Avenue Lesdiguières arriving at the huge Place d'Armes, named Place de la Constitution in 1870 and the Place de Verdun in 1919.)

The works on the fort and its defences were finished on 27 February 1847, taking a total of 23 years. (Note: By coincidence, the works on the defences lasted 23 years in the 17th century, if one counts a 5 year suspension, the same as in the 19th century.)

A small garrison was maintained in the fort until 1940. Since 1970, the entire fort has been the property of the city of Grenoble.

== Defence Systems ==
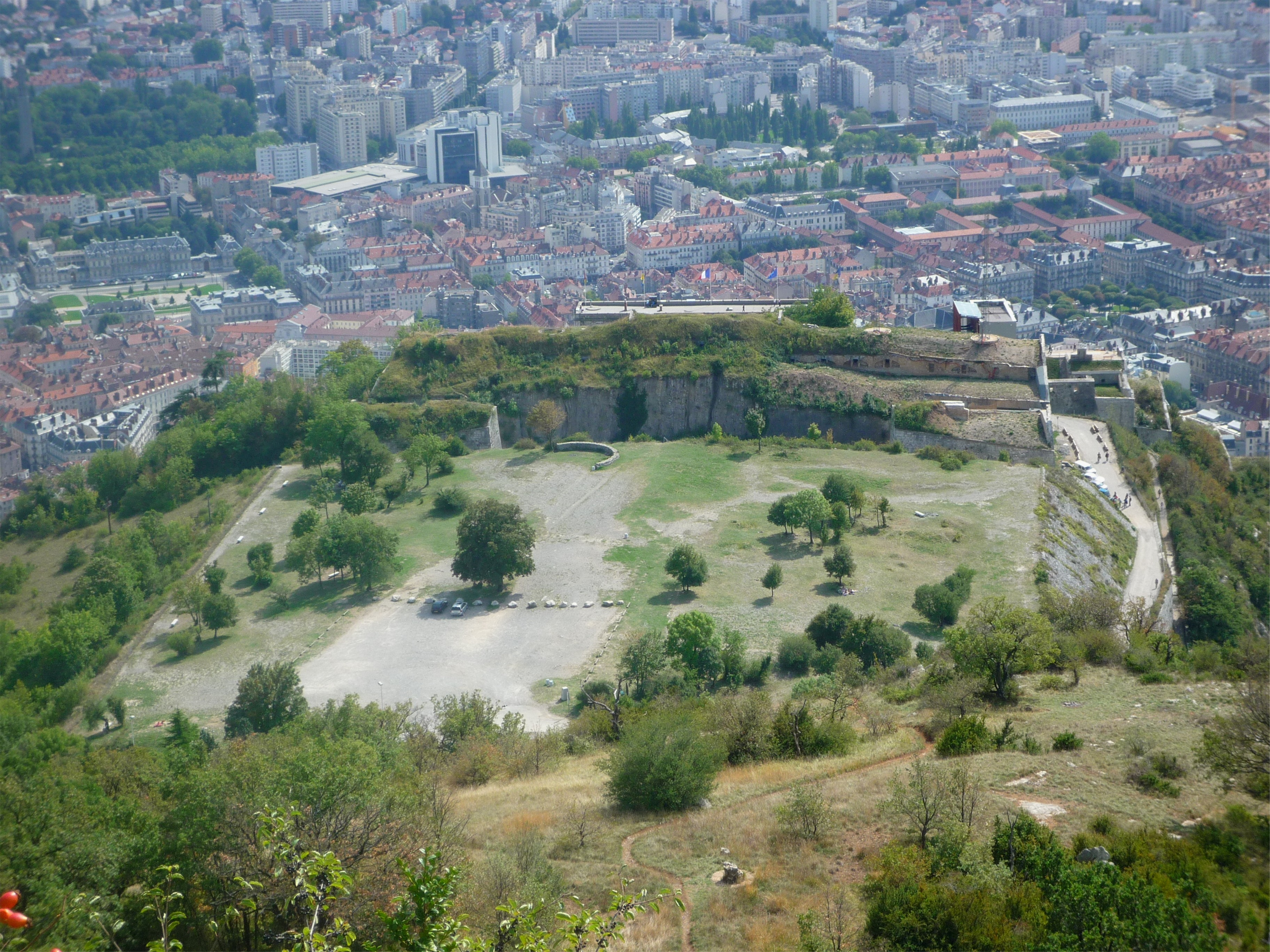
Glacis from mount Jalla

The fortress of the Bastille was not intended for firing on the city below, the artillery of the time being too imprecise. Its only weakness is that it is overlooked by the Chartreuse, which is why it is laid out in such a way as to facilitate firing towards the mountains behind and to repel any attacks coming from the Chartreuse. The keep of the fortress therefore, unlike those of the Middle Ages, is deliberately low and hidden by vegetation in order to surprise the enemy. It is separated from the rest of the mountain by a glacis and by ditches. The moat of the keep is defended by two half-bastions from which fire can be directed across each access point of the moat.

In 1844, to complete the defences, a system of linked caverns was excavated in the cliffs of Mount Jalla in front of the fort. A track not visible from the glacis and then an underground passage allowed troops to move between these caverns and the drawbridge at the entrance to the fort. These cavern batteries were large enough to house a munitions dump, so that troops were able to fire on attacking forces from the rear. Assailants would therefore find themselves trapped between fire from opposite directions. These caverns are known locally as the Mandrin Caves, an obvious anachronism as the dauphinois bandit and smuggler died some 90 years before their construction.

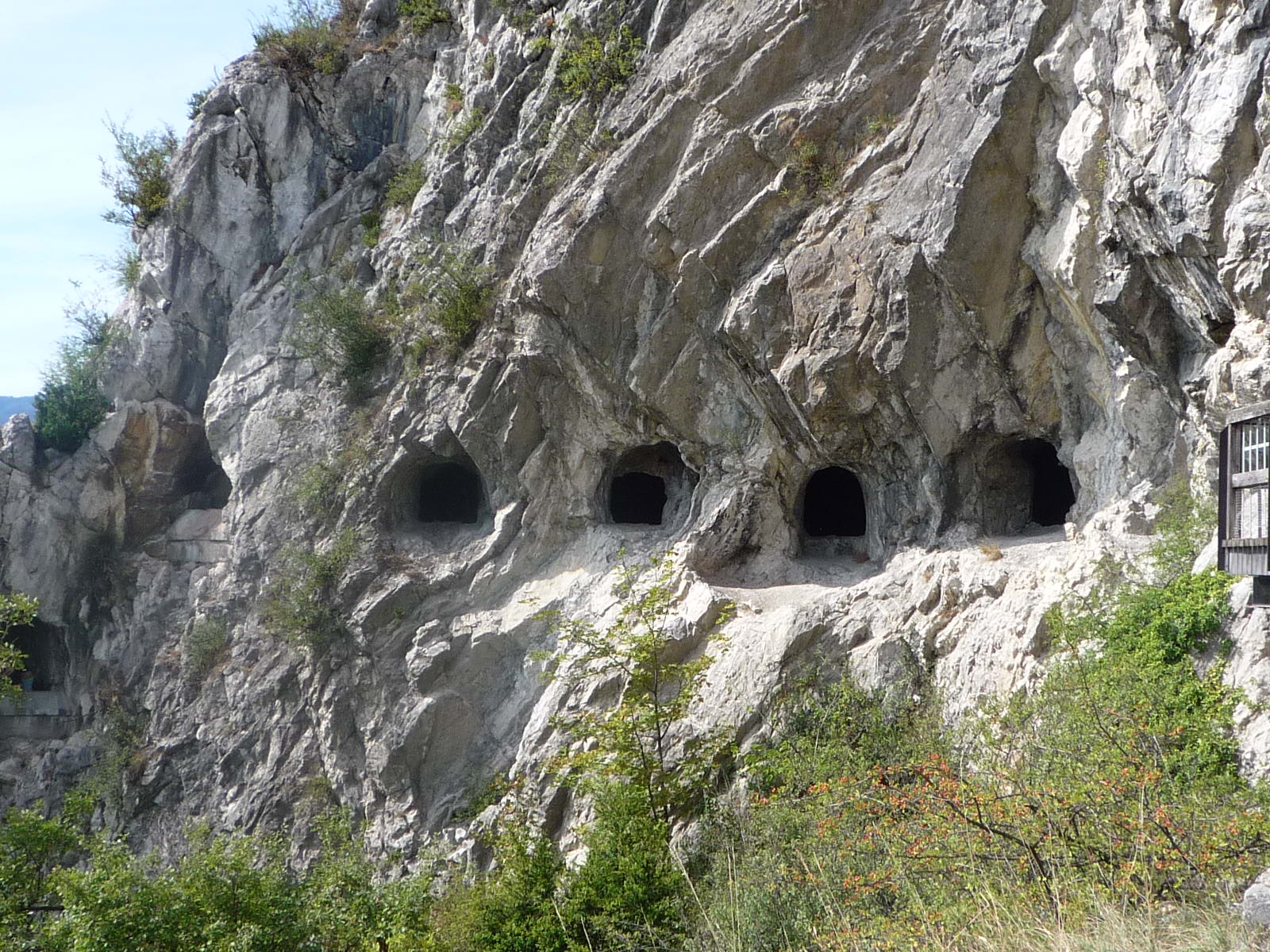
The Mandrin Caves

Another general principle of the fort's defences is to have as many sites as possible from which to fire on the wooded slopes outside the walls. Numerous vaulted casemates supply artillery positions, and above are found benches for riflemen. Casemates designed by Haxo were built, open at the rear to allow the evacuation of the smoke produced by gunpowder.

The Bastille was designed to defend Grenoble against attacks by Savoyards, the frontier being close by as Savoy was not yet part of France at the time the construction was finished. The annexation of Savoy by France in 1860 moved the border to its current position, and the threat disappeared. In addition the invention of the modern cannon (with rifled barrel and with shells replacing cannonballs ensuring far greater destructive power) rendered the fortress obsolete. The defence systems of the Bastille as well as the later ramparts constructed around the city have therefore never been called into service.

== Tourism ==
« I haven't the strength to describe the admirable view, which changes every hundred steps, that one enjoys from the Bastille... » It is with these words that Stendhal paid hommage to the site.

The Bastille is visited by some 600,000 people each year, approximately half of whom take the cable car from the city centre. The rest of the visitors go by car up the steep and narrow road from La Tronche, or on foot by one of the numerous signposted paths to reach the Bastille.

In 2005, the Bastille underwent substantial works in order to make the entirety of the site accessible to persons of reduced mobility. It is the setting for numerous exhibitions and social and cultural events, while also being the destination of an annual cycle race (La Prise De La Bastille) and a via ferrata (Les Prises De La Bastille).

There are reminders everywhere on the site of the protagonists of the fortifications of the hill. The central square of the fort is called Place Tournadre, the square above between the restaurant and the fort is Place Haxo, the terrace of the restaurant is the Belvédère Vauban (Vauban Viewpoint), and the large meeting and exhibition room of the fort is the Lesdiguières Room.

The site of the Bastille is recorded in the Supplementary Inventory of Historic Monuments. It has a number of tourist attractions, and forms part of the natural site of interest of ecology, flora and fauna of Mount Jalla. Positioned on 30 hectares (74 acres) of public land, the fortification has views towards the Vercors, Chartreuse and Belledonne mountains, and on a clear day the peak of Mont Blanc some 113 km (70 mi) distant can be seen.

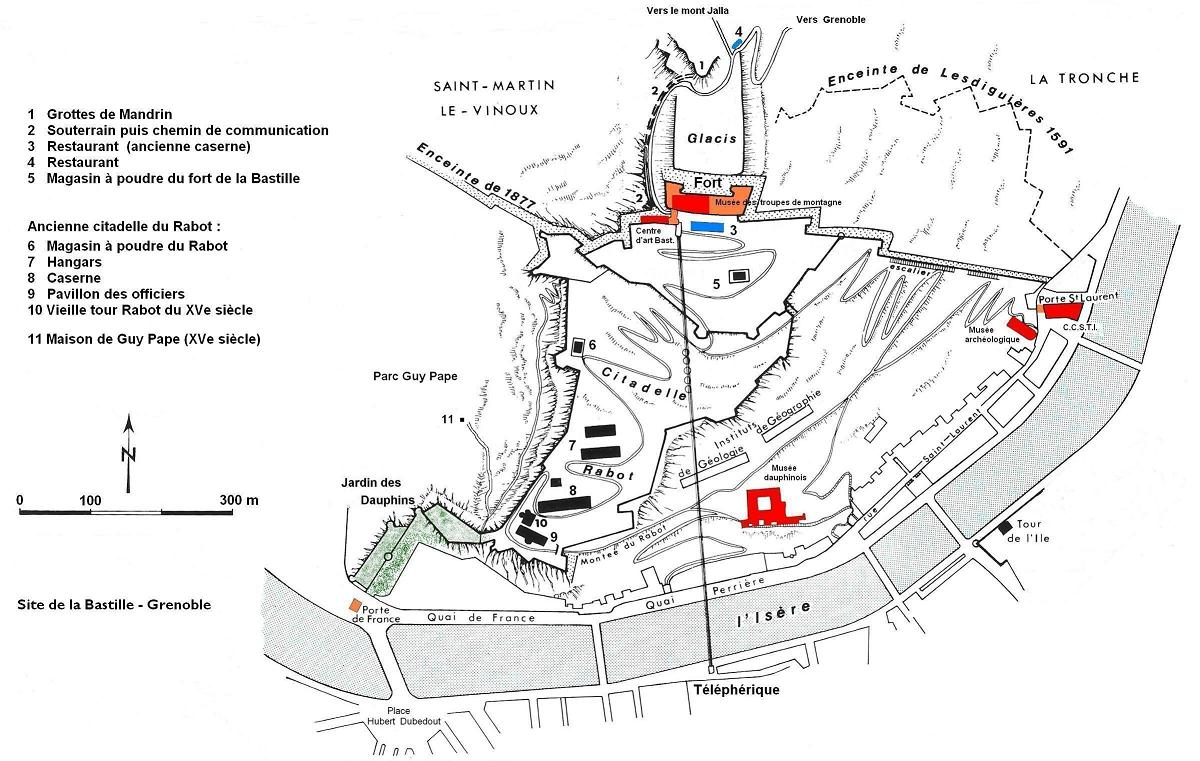
The site of the Bastille

=== The Cable Car ===
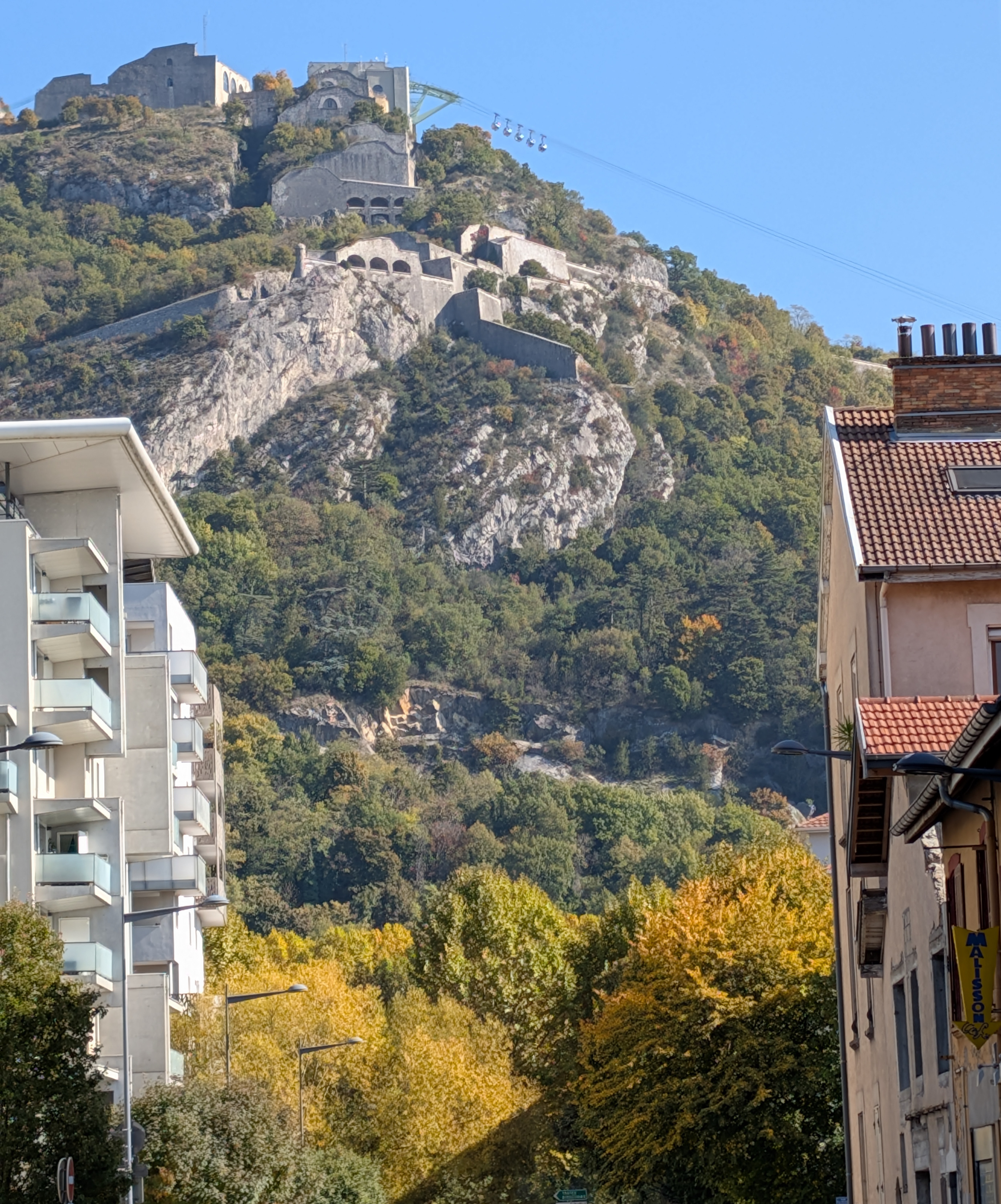
Departure of the Grenoble cable car as seen from below.

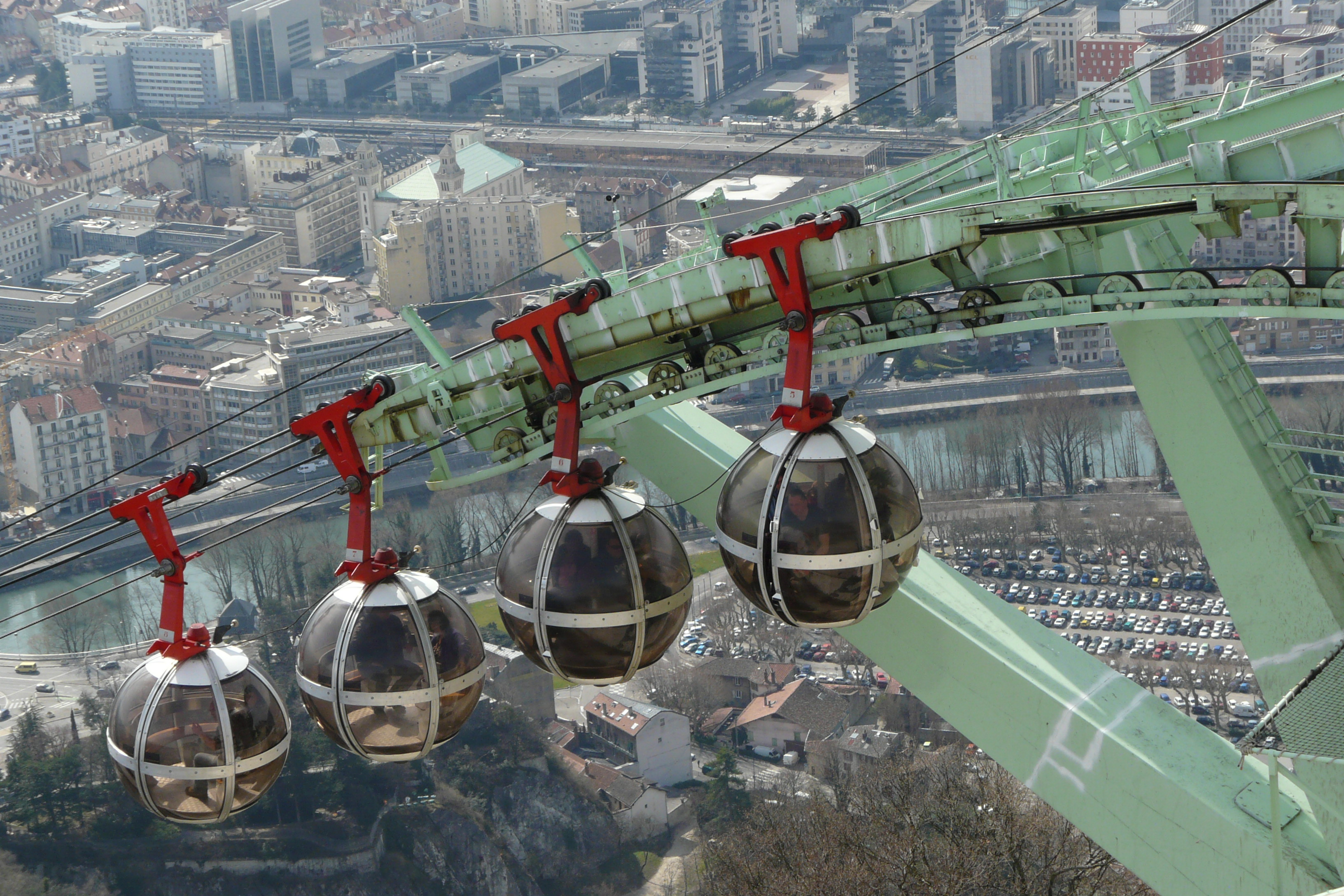
View from above of the cable cars arriving.

The Grenoble-Bastille cable car links the Bastille with the city centre of Grenoble and is just as well known as the fort itself. Constructed on the initiative of mayor Paul Mistral, it was inaugurated by his successor, Léon Martin in September 1934.

It is one of the oldest urban cable cars in the world and runs all year round (accumulating some 4,000 hours of service annually compared with 1,200 for a normal cable car). It has been run since 1983 by the Régie du Téléphérique de Grenoble, a city-owned industrial and commercial business which manages the continuous upgrades required to keep the site attractive to visitors and residents.

The route takes the cars across the Isère and over the roofs of the old Saint Laurent quarter before passing over a bastion of the curtain wall of the fort and then over the Rabot and various successive fortifications before arriving at the upper station.

In August 1976, the lower station was rebuilt slightly back from the quay so that the road no longer passed through an archway, and the spherical cabins ("the bubbles", 5 in summer and 4 in winter) made their first appearance. They were manufactured by the local company Poma and quickly dubbed the "bubbles".

Today more than 290,000 visitors take the cable car each year to admire the city and the valleys from one of the best viewpoints in Grenoble. The public can observe Cours Jean-Jaures which was laid out on a dyke raised at the end of the 17th century to keep the Drac river close to the Vercors cliffs. As of 2009, approximately 12 million people have been transported by the cable car since its opening in 1934.

Just outside the top station, the terrace of geologists greets visitors at the end of which stands a memorial stone bearing three medallions of Alpine geologists Charles Lory, Pierre Termier and Wilfrid Kilian.

=== Museums ===
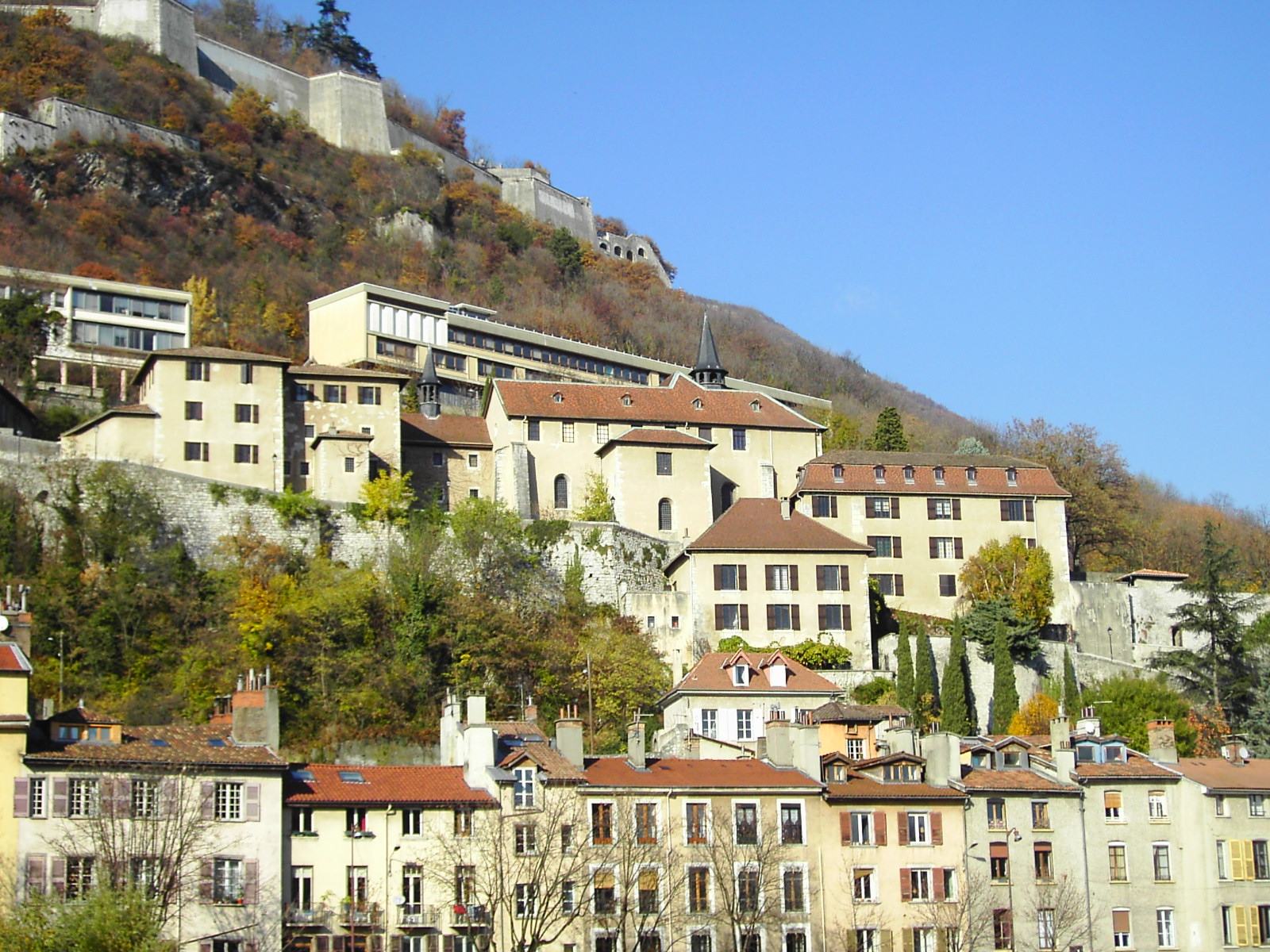
The Musée Dauphinois

The hill on which the Bastille sits counts five museums among its many attractions.

At the bottom of the hill is the Saint Laurent district, the location of the Grenoble Archaeological Museum, and also the first burial site of the city dating from Gallo-Roman times. Close by is the Centre of Scientific, Technical and Industrial Culture (CCSTI) of Grenoble, an institution dedicated to the popular understanding of science, housed since 1979 in the casemates close to the river.

Part way up the hill is the Musée Dauphinois, housed in the former convent of Sainte-Marie-d'en-Haut since 1968. This convent was built in 1621, and it is accessible by car from the quays, or on foot by the Montée de Chalemont, an old Roman lane in use until the 17th century.

Installed in the casemates of the fort itself, the Bastille Art Centre allows visitors to see contemporary art exhibitions, while the Museum of Mountain Troops installed since 2009 in the vaulted rooms of the keep makes excellent use of the space and the ambiance of the old building.

=== The Mandrin Caves ===
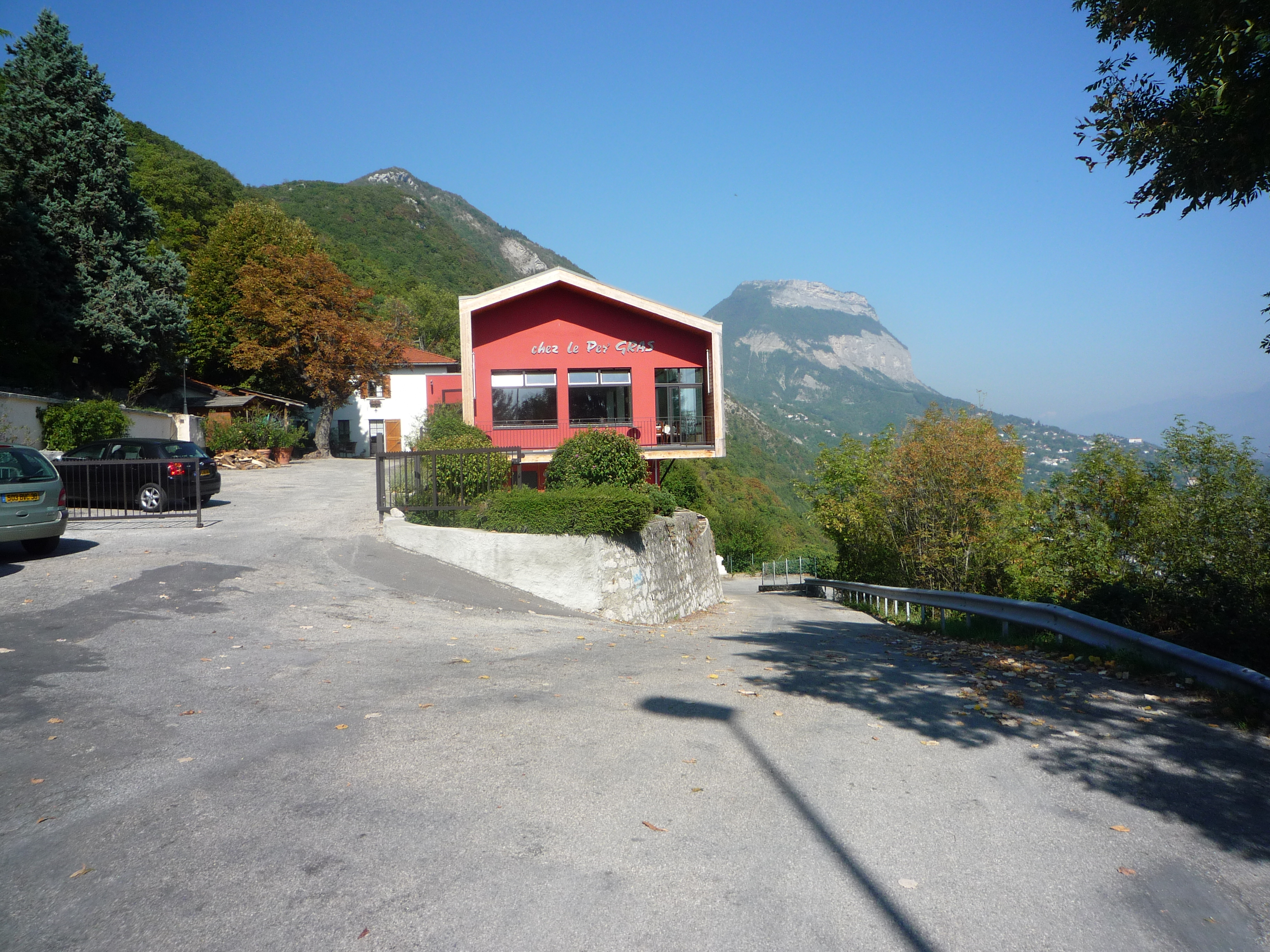
exit of glacis

Many tourists follow the underground passage leading from the entrance to the fort, giving access to the Mandrin Caves from which they can then exit at the opposite end of the glacis just by the second restaurant on the hill. This helps to give an idea of the extent of the defensive system of the fort.

On the way back from the glacis one can take the access road for the fort, which allows the visitor to get a better idea of the width of the moat in front of the keep and of the height of the fortress. The round trip takes around 30 minutes.

=== Mount Jalla ===
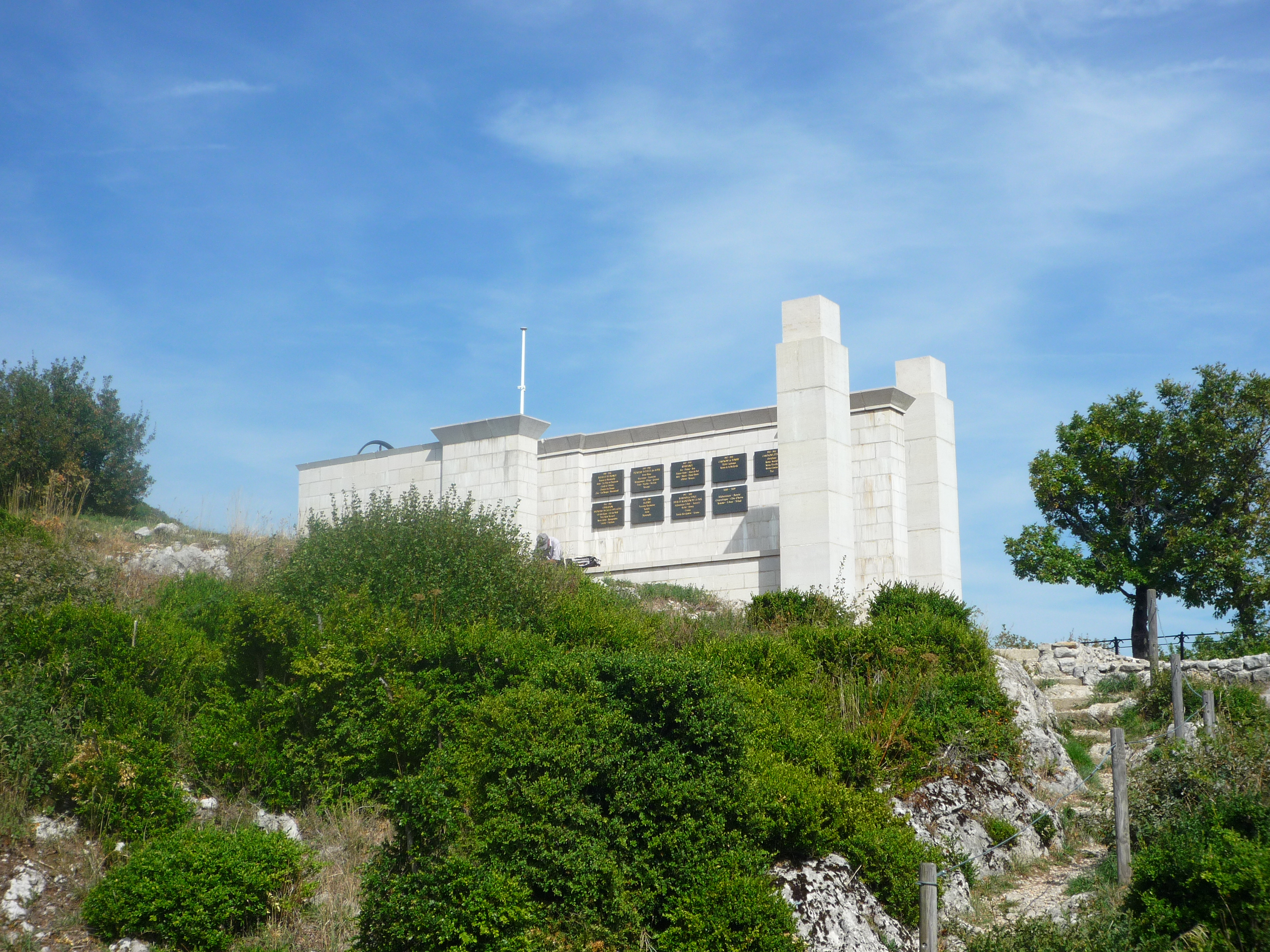
Mount Jalla Memorial

Above the Bastille, at an elevation of 630 m (2,070 ft), Mount Jalla can be reached on foot in 30 minutes from the glacis of the fort. There one can find the ruins of the cable car that once served to transport limestone extracted from the Vicat quarries from 1875, but more importantly one also finds the national memorial to the Mountain Troops. Close by is a viewpoint that looks out over the fortress of the Bastille.

The memorial was inaugurated on 17 June 2000, and is dedicated to the memory of the 150,000 mountain troops, known as the Blue Devils, who have fallen in combat since their creation in 1888.

The paths that traverse the Bastille form part of the local and national GR footpath network which allows the visitor to continue their walks and hikes in the rest of the Chartreuse.

=== The Jardin des Dauphins ===
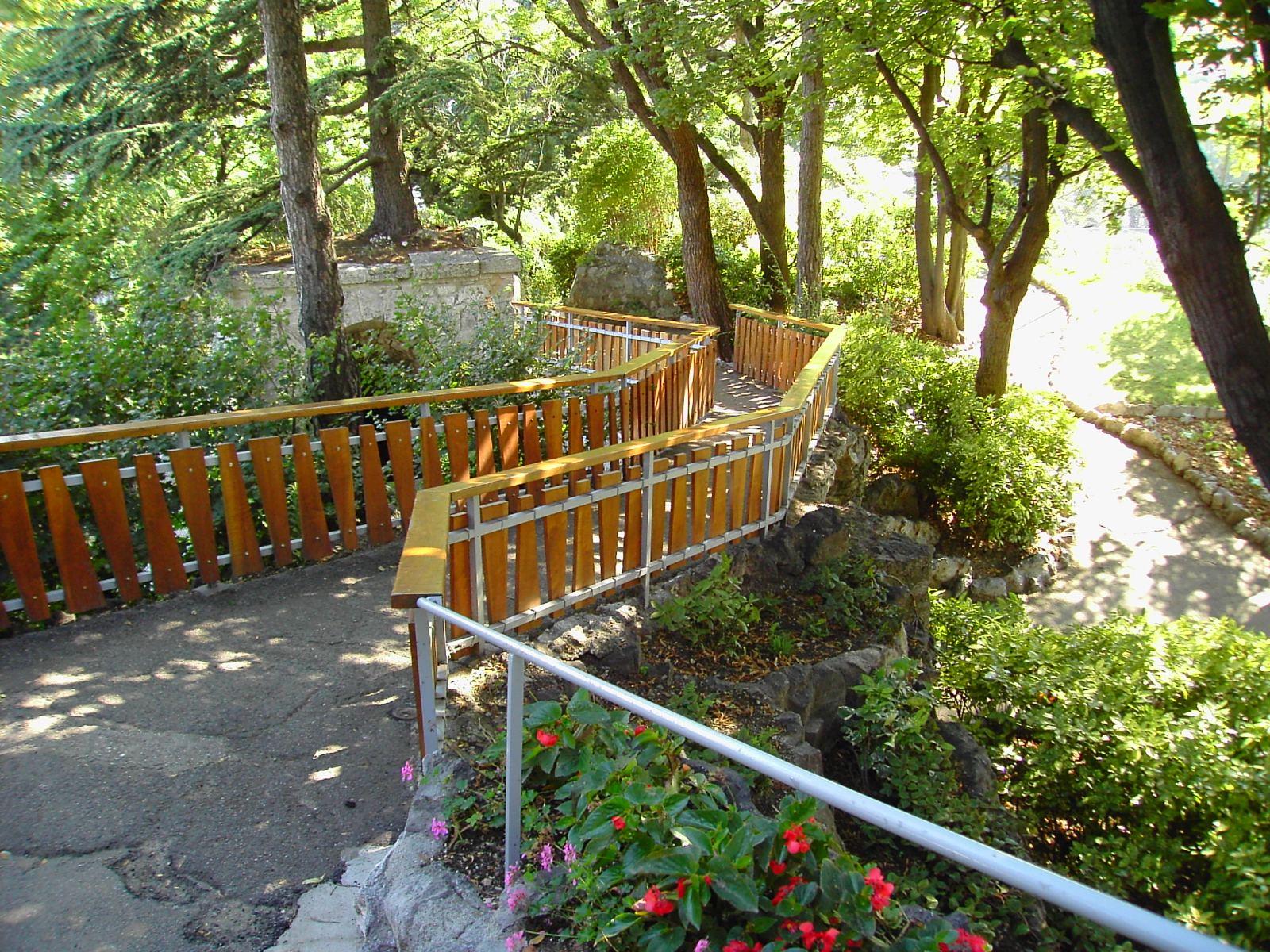
Jardin des Dauphins

The Jardin des Dauphins (or Princes Garden) was purchased in 1785 by Jean-Baptiste Dolle, a trader from Grenoble. It is situated at the foot of the hill, perched on a cliff close to the Porte de France, and is made up of a series of six terraces with retaining walls linked by steps, passageways and paths. Restored in 1909 by the architect Ginet, the garden began to take the form that we know today. In 1912, an orientation table was installed by the Touring Club of France, and the garden was subsequently refurbished again in 1960.

The orientation of the garden together with the dry limestone terrain create a Mediterranean micro-climate which has allowed the establishment of a typically southern flora (200 Mediterranean species), notably numerous Pubescent Oak, Araucaria, Cypress, Banana and Olive trees.

Visitors are welcomed to this 2-hectare (4.9-acre) garden by a mounted statue of dauphinoise heroine Philis de La Charce. They then follow the paths from terrace to terrace, passing through two tunnels and a spiral tower staircase. Above the Jardin des Dauphins, on the other side of a wooden bridge that crosses the moat of the fortifications, the Guy Pape park begins. There alone in the undergrowth but still visible from the city, one can still see the ruins of his house dating from the 15th century 45.197454°N 5.721077°E. On the cliffs overlooking this park is the upper section of the Grenoble via ferrata "Les Prises de la Bastille", installed in 1999.
