= Charles Lory =

French geologist

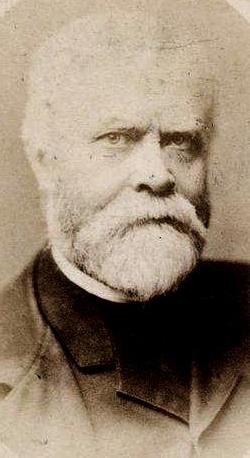
- Born: 30 July 1823
- Died: 3 May 1889 (aged 65)
- Scientific career
- Fields: Geology
- Thesis: Observations sur la respiration et la structure des Orobanches (1847)

Charles Lory (30 July 1823 – 3 May 1889) was a French geologist.

He was born at Nantes. He graduated D. Sc. in 1847. In 1852 he was appointed to the chair of geology at the University of Grenoble, and in 1881 to that of the École Normale Supérieure in Paris.

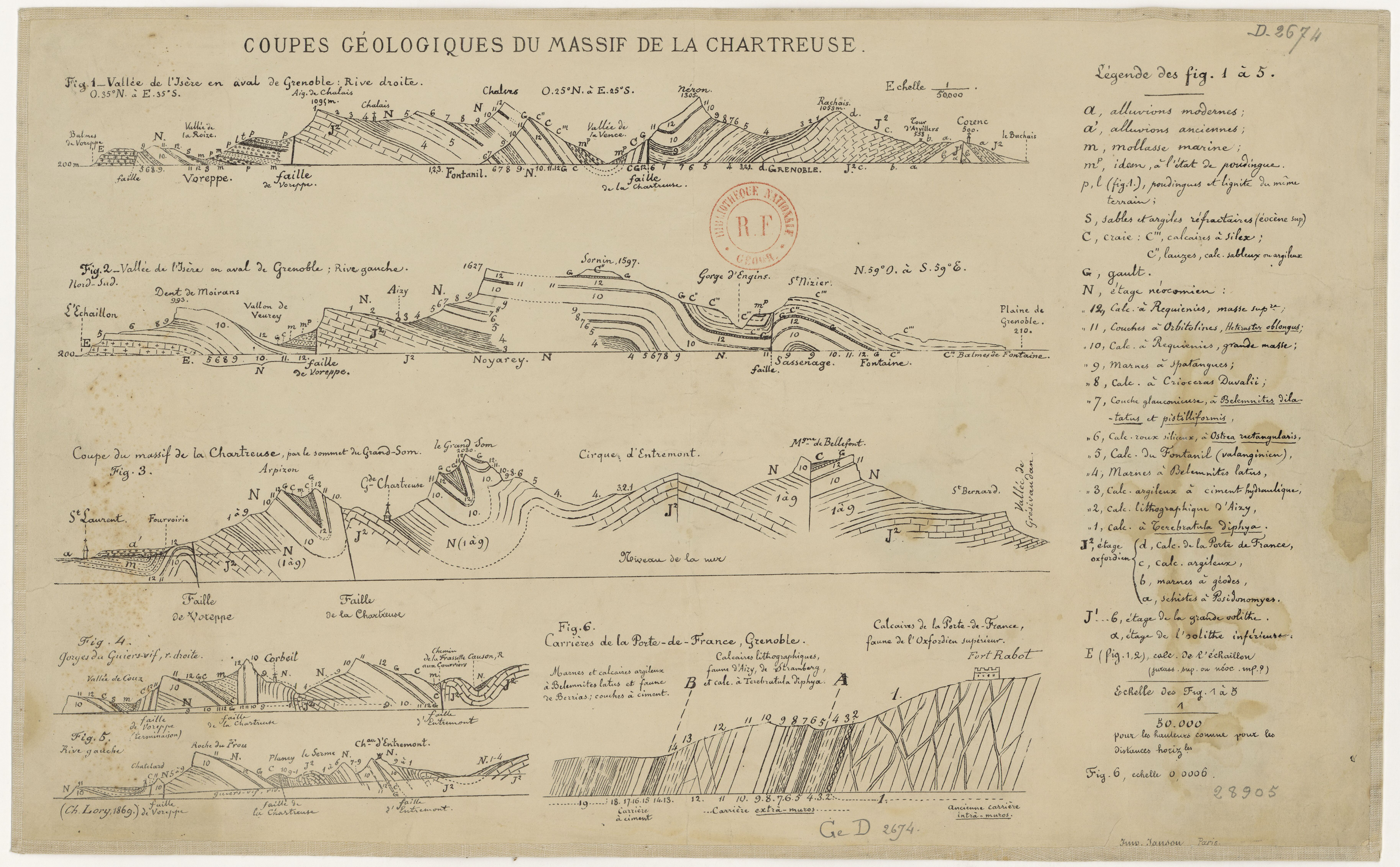
Coupes géologiques du massif de la Chartreuse

He was distinguished for his research on the geology of the French Alps, being engaged in the geological survey of the départements of Isère, Drôme and the Hautes-Alpes, for which he prepared maps and explanatory memoirs. He dealt with disturbances in the Savoy Alps, described fan-like structures, and confirmed the views of Jean Alphonse Favre with regard to overthrows, reversals and duplication of the strata.

His contributions to geological literature also include descriptions of the fossils and stratigraphical divisions of the Lower Cretaceous and Jurassic rocks of the Jura Mountains. He died in Grenoble on 3 May 1889.
