= Bastille Day attack =

There have been several attacks on the 14th of July, known as Bastille Day:

- Storming of the Bastille in Paris, France, in 1789.
- 2016 Nice truck attack in Nice, France, in 2016.
