= Comité de vigilance des intellectuels antifascistes =

French political organization

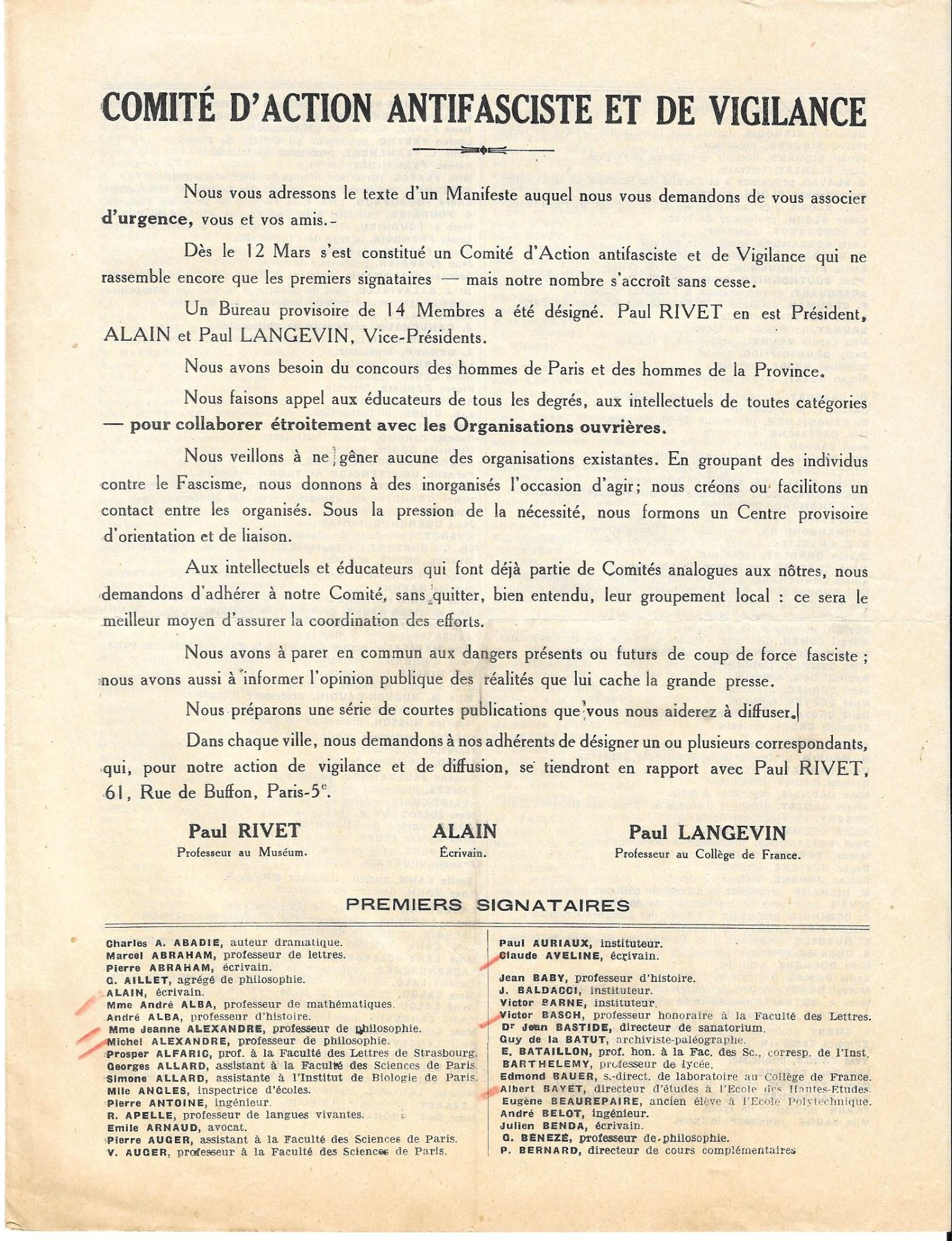
Manifesto of the Comité de vigilance des intellectuels antifascistes

The Watchfulness Committee of Antifascist Intellectuals (French: Comité de vigilance des intellectuels antifascistes, CVIA) was a French socialist and antifascist organization created in March 1934, in the wake of the February 6, 1934 riots organized by far right leagues, which had led to the fall of the second Cartel des gauches (Left-Wing Coalition) government. Founded by Pierre Gérôme, philosopher Alain, physicist Paul Langevin and ethnologist Paul Rivet, it edited a newsletter, Vigilance, and boasted more than 6,000 members at the end of 1934.

The CVIA had an important role in the unification of the three left-wing families (Radical-Socialist Party, French Section of the Workers' International (SFIO, socialist party) and Communist Party) which led to the Popular Front in 1936. It divided itself however on the attitude to adopt toward Nazi Germany: while most members opposed the appeasement policy which led to the November 1938 Munich Agreement, some upheld pacifism over all.

The group disbanded in 1939.

== Foundation of the CVIA ==
The Committee was founded in March 1934 under the initiative of Pierre Gérôme (pseudonym of François Walter, who worked doing audits at the Cour des Comptes). Pierre Gérôme had first contacted the CGT trade union, in particular André Delmas and Georges Lapierre, who directed the Syndicat national des instituteurs (SNI), a teachers' trade union affiliated to the CGT. Three important personalities took part in the Antifascist Committee's foundation: Paul Rivet, a socialist ethnologist, philosopher Alain, often considered as the thinker of the Radical-Socialist Party (although his anti-militarism and resistance toward all powers might lead him to be categorized as an anarchist or libertarian thinker), and physicist Paul Langevin, close to the Communist Party (PCF).

The founding text of the CVIA, a manifest titled Aux travailleurs (To Labor, March 5, 1934), had an immediate success. In a few weeks, the Committee boasted 2,300 members, and at the end of 1934, more than 6,000 members (teachers, writers, journalists, etc.) Gathering the three left-wing families (Radical-Socialist, SFIO and Communist Party), the Committee retrospectively appears as a precursor to the Popular Front (1936–38) led by Léon Blum.

== Antifascism and pacifism: divisions among the Committee ==
The Committee was torn apart as soon as 1936, dividing itself on the issue of pacifism and the appeasement policy towards Adolf Hitler. Supporters of a firm attitude toward Hitler left the CVIA in two successive moments: first at the June 1936 Congress, with Paul Langevin's departure from the CVIA's head; and after the November 1938 Munich Agreement between Germany, France and the UK. In this last occasion, France divided itself into Munichois (partisans of the accords and of the appeasement policy) and Anti-Munichois, opposed the accords — this division line did not follow the left/right wing separation, with members from each side supporting both options. Whilst head of the government Édouard Daladier was acclaimed at his return from Munich, the realist pacifist tendency of the CVIA, represented by Paul Rivet and Pierre Gérôme, left the Committee at this occasion, thus leaving only the most radical pacifists in the Committee (Alexandre, Léon Emery). A few of the most radical pacifists would go as far as collaborating with the German troops in the hope of a reestablishment of the Republic (replaced after the 1940 Battle of France by the reactionary "French State" led by Marshall Pétain). These pacifists would gather themselves into the Ligue de la pensée française (French Thought League).

Despite these divisions, the Comité de vigilance, as it was popularly known, remained an important moment of the history of antifascism and of the left-wing in France. It had an important role in unifying the various perspectives from the parties that composed the Popular Front (Radical-Socialist Party, SFIO and PCF), and it created a lasting antifascism political tradition, which doubtlessly had its shares in the creation of the French Resistance. Paul Rivet, for example, would be a member of the Resistant Groupe du musée de l'Homme (musée de l'Homme group).

== Notable members of the CVIA ==
=== Founders ===
- Pierre Gérôme (pseudonym of François Walter)
- Paul Rivet (socialist ethnologist)
- Alain (philosopher)
- Paul Langevin (communist physicist)
- André Delmas (SNI, CGT)
- Georges Lapierre (SNI, CGT)

=== Other members ===
- Michel Alexandre and Jeanne Alexandre (close to Alain)
- Jean Baby
- Victor Basch
- Marcel Bataillon
- Albert Bayet
- Henri Bouche (aeronautics specialist and author of "Non! La Guerre n'est pas Fatale!")
- André Chamson
- Georges Canguilhem
- Francis Delaisi (socialist journalist and economist, member of the Human Rights League (LDH), of the CVIA; collaborated during the Occupation).
- Jean Guéhenno
- René Iché
- Jules Isaac (historian, author of the famous school-manual Malet-Isaac).
- Frédéric Joliot-Curie
- Irène Joliot-Curie
- Éllie Faure
- Paul Nizan
- André Malraux
- René Maublanc
- Jean Baptiste Perrin
- René Gosse (SFIO, for a short time PCF, dean of the faculty of sciences in Grenoble, resistant killed in 1943).
- Roger Hagnauer (educator, PCF, CGT-FO).
- Jean Lescure (secretary of Jean Giono, worked at the radio and in theaters, including resistant activities during Vichy).
- Marcel Lefrancq (Belgian Communist Party)
- Simone Weil (social critic, philosopher, mystic)

== See also ==
- Alianza de Intelectuales Antifascistas
- French Left
- No pasarán

== Bibliography ==
- (in French) Nicole Racine-Furlaud, "Pacifistes et antifascistes. Le Comité de vigilance des intellectuels antifascistes" in Des années trente. Groupes et ruptures, textes réunis par Anne Roche et Christian Tarting, Paris, Éditions du CNRS, 1985.
- (in French) Nicole Racine, "Le Comité de vigilance des intellectuels antifascistes" in Dictionnaire historique de la vie politique française, sous la direction de J-F Sirinelli, PUF, 1995.
