= Jean Baby =

French historian and economist

Jean Édouard Dominique Baby (4 August 1897 – 9 January 1969) was a French historian, economist and communist activist.

== Biography ==
Born into a wealthy family, Jean Baby studied history and passed the history agrégation in 1923. In the 1920s he taught in high schools in Prague, Lorient and Toulouse. He was active in the French Communist Party (PCF), which he joined in 1925, as well as in the Fédération unitaire de l'enseignement and the CGTU.

He was a candidate in the constituency of Muret, against Vincent Auriol, during the legislative elections of 1928. He headed the Communist list in the municipal elections of 1929 in Toulouse. Excluded from the PCF in November 1929, he was reinstated in October 1931.

After the Second World War, he was a teacher at the Lycée Jacques-Decour in Paris. Considered one of the main economists of the PCF, he became in 1954 editor-in-chief of the journal Économie et politique directed by Jean Pronteau. He also taught at the Institute of Political Studies in Paris.

His criticism of the PCF's policies led to his definitive exclusion in April 1960. After completely breaking with the PCF ideologically, he moved towards Maoism. In 1960, he was among the first signatories of the Manifesto of the 121 on the right to insubordination in the Algerian War. He died from heart failure in Paris.

== Works ==
- Le rôle social de l’Église, Paris, Bureau d’éditions, 1931.
- La Jeunesse devant le fascisme, suivi de Manifeste aux travailleurs, by Paul Rivet, Alain et Paul Langevin, Paris, P. Gérôme, 1934.
- Cours de marxisme : première année, 1935-1936 : les classes, l'égalité, la liberté, l'État, l'individu, socialisme et communisme, by René Maublanc and Georges Politzer, Paris, Bureau d'éditions, 1936.
- À la lumière du marxisme : essais : sciences physico-mathématiques, sciences naturelles, sciences humaines, avec Marcel Cohen et Georges Friedmann, introduction by Henri Wallon, Paris, Éditions sociales internationales, 1936.
- Les classes sociales, Hanoï, Éditions CGP, 1945.
- L'égalité, Hanoi͏̈, Éditions CGP, 1945.
- Les richesses naturelles en URSS, Paris, Éditions France-URSS, 1945.
- Histoire générale contemporaine 1er fascicule, De 1848 à 1871, complément : 1848-1939 : classes de philosophie et de mathématiques : ouvrage conforme au programme de 1945, by Jean Bruhat et Jeanne Gaillard, Paris, Bibliothèque française, 1946.
- Le Marxisme, Paris, Les Cours de Droit, 1947.
- Principes fondamentaux d'économie politique, Paris, Éditions sociales, 1949.
- La vérité sur le procès Rajk, by Jacques Duclos, Julien Benda and Pierre Courtade, Paris, Démocratie nouvelle, 1949.
- L'antisoviétisme contre la France, Paris, Editions France-URSS, 1950.
- Crédit, banque et bourse, by Jacqueline Brasseul and Jean Varloot, Paris, Union française universitaire, 1950.
- Les trusts milliardaires en France, présentation de Jean Baby, Paris, SOPEC, 1952.
- Le marxisme, Paris, Amicale des élèves de l'Institut d'études politiques de l'Université de Paris, 1959.
- Conférences sur Le Capital de Karl Marx 1, Les introductions. La marchandise. La valeur, Paris, Bureau d'Editions, 1959.
- La Chine, by Ernest Kahane, Paris, Les Cahiers rationalistes, 1959.
- La crise de la jeunesse, Paris, 1960.
- Critique de base. Le Parti communiste français entre le passé et l’avenir, Paris, François Maspero, 1960.
- La grande controverse sino-soviétique, 1956-1966, Paris, Grasset, 1966.
- Les lois fondamentales de l'économie capitaliste. Paris, Éditions Gît-le-Cœur, 1969.
- Un monde meilleur : recherche marxiste, préface de Pierre Jalée, Paris, François Maspéro, 1973.
