= Grenoble's Saint-Bartholomew =

Massacre in Grenoble during WWII

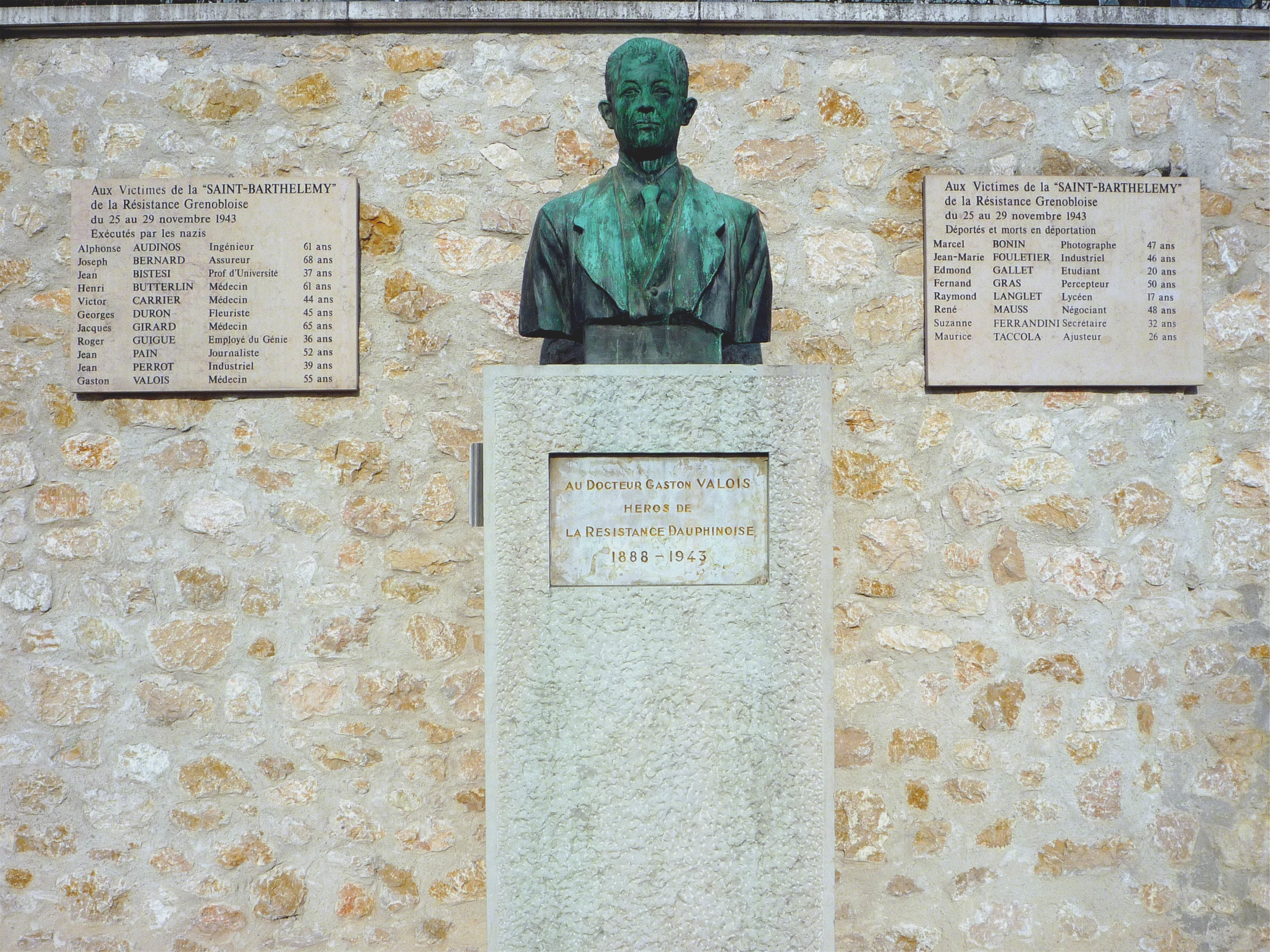
- Commemorative monument
- Date: November 25–30, 1943
- Location: Grenoble, France
- Type: Massacre
- Perpetrators: Nazi Germany, and French collaborators during World War II
- Participants: 157th Infantry Division (Germany)
- Deaths: 19 + René Gosse and his son in December
- Missing: 5

The Grenoble's Saint-Bartholomew—a term used by historian François Boulet in his book Les Alpes françaises, 1940–1944)—were the arrests and assassinations of the leaders of Grenoble's resistance to German occupation, taking place November 25–30, 1943. It was carried out by a team of collaborationists under the orders of Jacques Doriot and the Lyon French Popular Party (PPF) led by Francis André. It was named after the St. Bartholomew's Day massacre, the Protestant massacre of 1572.

During the Second World War, while the north of France had been occupied by German troops since June 1940, the southern or Zone libre (free zone) was invaded in November 1942, except for the Alps region, which found itself under a much less violent Italian occupation. This situation attracted many refugees and academics to Grenoble. The city's proximity to imposing mountain ranges and the ease with which Maquis fighters could hide made it an ideal location for the development of resistance to the occupation. On September 8, 1943, the French Alps were in turn invaded by the Germans, who quickly decided to eliminate this resistance in a vast operation.

In addition to five people who were deported but returned alive, Grenoble's Saint-Bartholomew's toll was eleven murders and eight deaths during deportation, with the future Prefect of Isère, Albert Reynier, narrowly avoiding capture.

== Context ==
Occupied and free zones in 1943.

During the Second World War, Grenoble was located in the free zone until November 1942. During this period, Operation Torch, the landing of Allied troops in North Africa, led to the invasion of most of the free zone by German troops and the occupation by the Italian army of an area east of the Rhône valley.

The city of Grenoble, with its population of 100,000, was occupied on November 11, 1942, by the 8,000 men of the 5th Italian Alpine Division "Pusteria", (General Maurizio Lazzaro de Castiglioni). Their area of responsibility stretched from Lake Geneva to the Durance. This period of Italian occupation was a relatively safe one in Grenoble, particularly for persecuted Jews from the occupied zone such as the future historian Marc Ferro but also for academics and scientists such as the future Nobel Prize winner Louis Néel. On September 8, 1943, the territories occupied by the Italians were in turn controlled by the Germans following the signing of the Armistice of Cassibile between Italy and the Allies. The arrival of German troops in Grenoble in September 1943 led to a much more violent occupation.

From 1940, people from different social backgrounds, with no relation to each other, joined the resistance and gradually organized themselves. (Note: Abbé Pierre, vicar in Grenoble since 1939, was involved in the Resistance, particularly in the writing of false papers, according to Duclos & Ihl (2004, p. 58)) Young men who had refused Compulsory Work Service arrived in Grenoble in increasing numbers, and joined the various Maquis in the mountains. In December 1942, one of the first Maquis in France was set up in the Vercors Massif overlooking the city. On the BBC, Grenoble became the "capital of the Maquis".

== German occupation ==
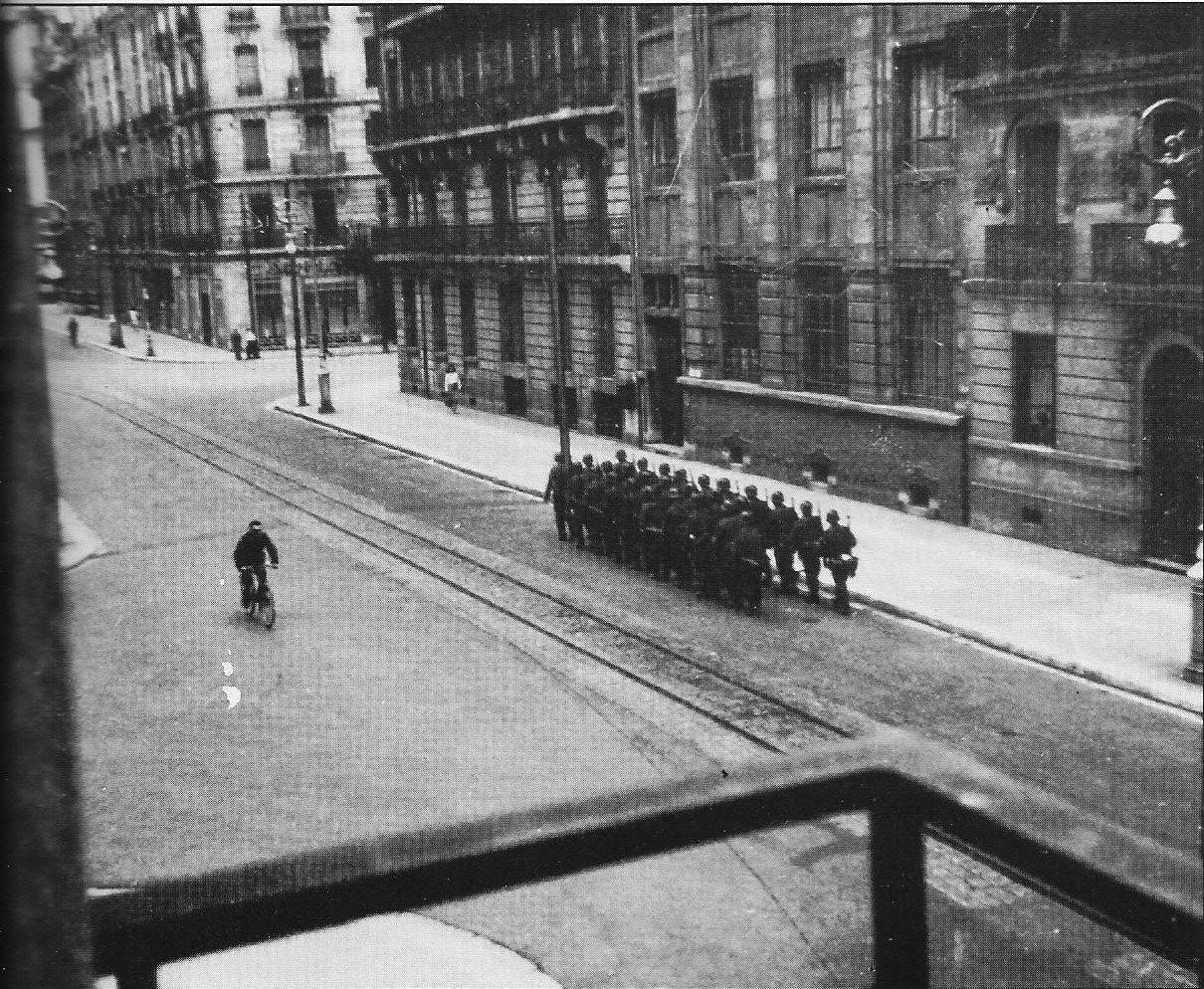
A section of the German army marches down boulevard Édouard-Rey towards the Victor-Hugo Square.

On the morning of September 9, 1943, the German occupation led to the installation of the 157th Reserve Division, commanded by General Karl Pflaum. Under his command, 15,000 troops moved into the Alpine departments, driving out the Italian soldiers. Installed at the Wehrmacht headquarters on Place Pasteur in the Maison des Étudiants (Student's House), his priority was to house repressive bodies such as the Gestapo. Then, on September 29, 1943, the SD (Sicherheitsdienst), the security service responsible for espionage in Lyon, seconded its Einsatzkommando to Grenoble, under the command of SS Paul Heimann. A large nine-storey building was requisitioned at 28, Av. Berriat. The 2-year-old engineer André Abry was shot dead on October 6 in the street of Palanka, as he had just placed his briefcase on the pavement to open his garage door.

Twenty years later, Lucienne Gosse, wife of Dean René Gosse, wrote of this period, "The Germans who arrived in Grenoble in September 1943 were no longer the triumphant victors of June 1940. They were afraid of the Alpine zone, where BBC broadcasts were announcing the presence of tens of thousands of young men ready for combat, and giving Grenoble the title of maquis capital. The Germans called this region Little Russia, and as they feared Great Russia even more, the fear of being sent to the Eastern Front aroused their repressive zeal; terror reigned there right up to the end of their occupation."

From December 1943, the Grenoble garrison grew in importance and strength. This was reflected in the relocation of the headquarters of the Reich Security Police, the Sipo-SD (Sicherheitspolizei), in April 1944 to a hotel on Boulevard Maréchal-Pétain, (Note: Boulevard Gambetta was so named from 1940 to 1944.) and the replacement of Chief Heimann by SS-Hauptsturmführer Hartung.

== Resistance activities in November 1943 ==
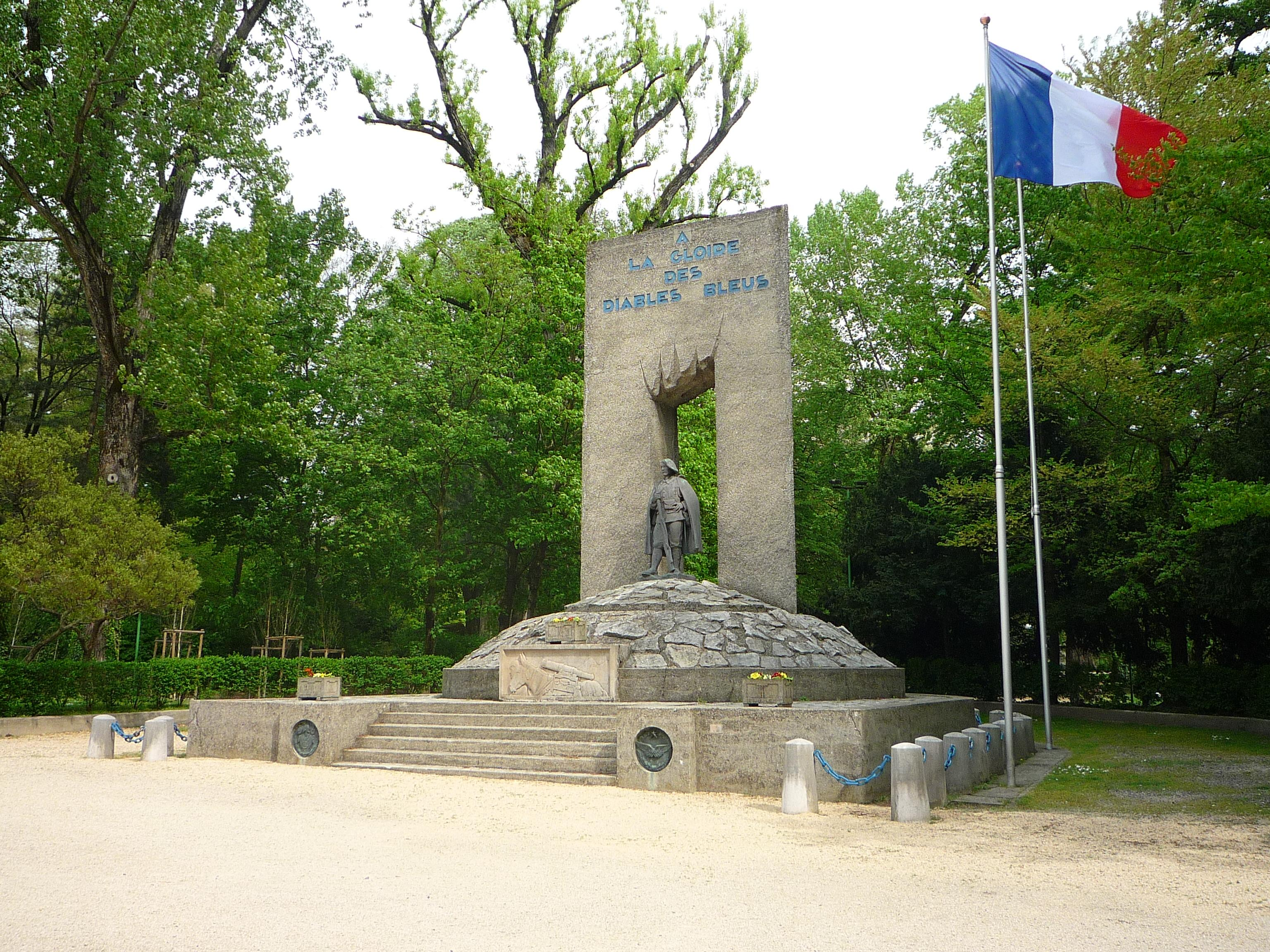
Monuments to The Blue Devils in Grenoble.

Tension between the population and the occupying forces worsened in November. A few days earlier, in October, the Milice headquarters on Square Victor-Hugo had been machine-gunned and the Germans saw their immediate collaborators fall one after the other to Resistance fighters' bullets. Stemming from the Combat resistance movement, the action of the "groupes francs", armed action groups made up of the most dynamic and mobile men, constituting the armed wing in charge of immediate action, exerted a real undermining effect on the Germans' morale. At their head in Isère was Commandant Louis Nal.

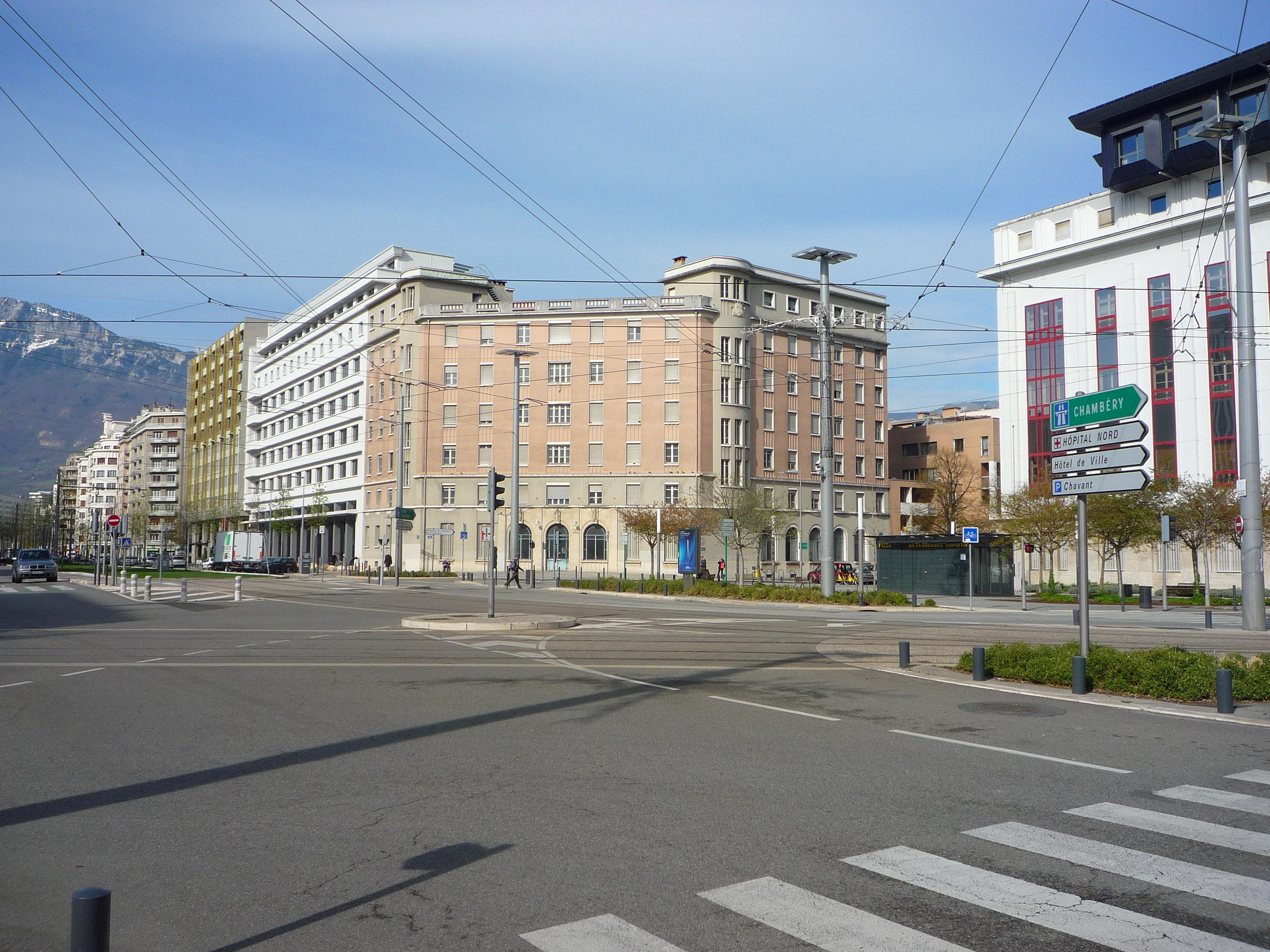
The German Kommandatur in Grenoble was located in the Place Pasteur in the Student House (center). Demonstrators were grouped to the right of the building.

The people of Dauphiné were called to Remembrance Day at the Port-de-France war memorial on the right side of the Isère, but as they approached the Port-de-France bridge, the Garde Mobile prevented the demonstrators from crossing and pushed them back. Chanting La Marseillaise, the 1,500 demonstrators then decided to head for the Blue Devils monument in the Paul-Mistral Park. Once there, they barely had time to place a bouquet (Note: Cyclist Bernard Gauthier, for his part, went to fix a tricolor flag on the monument to the Blue Devils (testimony of a demonstrator, Éliane Plaussu née Hyvernaud (1923-2018)).) before they were surrounded by German forces, and 600 of them were arrested. Parked in Pasteur Square, visible from General Karl Pflaum's office, the women and children under 16 were released after a few hours but 369 were held at the Bonne barracks, to be deported two months later to concentration camps. Of the 369 young men under the age of 30 deported to Buchenwald after two months in Compiègne, only 102 survived at war's end. (Note: In tribute, a street in Grenoble was named rue des Déportés du 11 novembre 1943 (Street of the November 11, 1943 Deportees).)

A report dated November 11, 1943, from the commander of the Isère gendarmerie, who was present at the arrival of the demonstration, states that there were "around 1,500 demonstrators", and adds: "[The Germans] deployed in skirmishers and ran with automatic weapons and revolvers pointed at the crowd. Fortunately, the G.M.R. and Gendarmes, who were busy pushing the crowd towards the town, found themselves placed between the Germans and the civilians, which prevented the use of fire that was about to occur. (...) The Commissaire Central de Police, the Major of the G.M.R., the Major of the Guard and the Major of the Compagnie de Gendarmerie then rushed to the German soldiers to warn them not to fire. (...) At 11:40 a.m., four heads of department [of the French police authorities, including the author of the report] were taken to the Student House, escorted by German soldiers with their weapons drawn. On arrival, all four were searched and stripped of their weapons. The four department heads were released at 1 p.m. after being warned that they would be held responsible for any further incidents. While the authorities were at the Student House, they found that German troops had maneuvered and surrounded around 5-600 people going off into the adjacent streets, and led them into a wire-wrapped area near a General Staff building. In the afternoon, the women and children were released. The men were taken to the Bonne barracks."

Unrelated to this demonstration, a spectacular attack took place in Grenoble on the night of November 13 to 14, destroying the German ammunition depot located in the north of the city on the artillery polygone with a huge explosion. At around 11 p.m., 150 tonnes of ammunition and 1,000 tonnes of equipment went up in smoke, depriving the German occupiers of precious explosive resources. The blast was heard over fifty kilometers away and incandescent clouds rose higher than the surrounding mountains. This feat was the work of Grenoble resistance fighter Aimé Requet. The operation had already been in preparation for six months, thanks in particular to a warrant officer from Lorraine by the name of Schumacher who, working in the arsenal, drew up the execution plans. Initially scheduled for November 6, the firing was postponed to the 10th, then to the 14th, due to faulty ignition.

== Red week ==
On November 15, 1943, the Gestapo got together to suppress these resistance movements with a lightning operation, calling in a team of Lyonnais militiamen led by Francis André. Under the direction of SS August Moritz, they received information from the Girousse couple of the Mouvement Franciste, and decided on the details of the operation in retaliation for the death of collaborators in Grenoble.

At 6 p.m. on November 25, the operation began with the simultaneous arrests of Communist Party member Roger Guigue in his wife's hairdressing salon on rue Brocherie, journalist Jean Pain in the Café La Table ronde on Saint-André square and lottery ticket salesman Georges Duron in his wife's flower store on Victor-Hugo square, marking the start of this series of murders. After the interrogation of the three resistance fighters, each was executed in a different part of the town. A leaflet was found on their bodies with the inscription: "This man pays with his life for the death of a national".

On November 26, Dr. Jacques Girard was arrested at 2 p.m. at his home at 60, street Élisée-Chatin, interrogated in a house requisitioned by the killers and executed. Francis André's team, assisted by the local militia, carried out new arrests and executions every hour. Doctor Henri Butterlin was arrested at 3 p.m. at his home at 5, street de Palanka, Alphonse Audinos at 5:30 p.m. at 22, avenue Berriat and Joseph Bernard at 6:30 p.m. at 26, square Vaucanson, All three were executed the same day, and the bodies of two of them were found far from their place of arrest, in Vif for Henri Butterlin and in Claix for Jacques Girard.

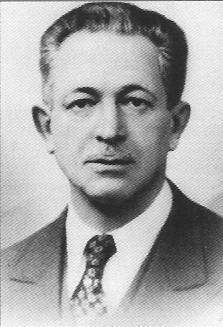
Gaston Valois.

At 2 a.m. on November 27, Dr. Gaston Valois was arrested at his home at 5, Palanka Street. The team of killers discovered important documents relating to the Grenoble Resistance. However, the doctor had taken the precaution of cutting the documents in two, giving the second half to his secretary Henri Maubert, who had been hospitalized at the Alpes clinic a few weeks earlier under a false name. Suzanne Ferrandini, Dr. Valois' secretary, was also arrested. During their transfer to Gestapo headquarters, Dr. Valois tried in vain to seize a weapon to commit suicide. Then, at 4:30 a.m., Henri Maubert (Note: Henri Maubert is deported but returns alive.) was arrested at the Alpes clinic, and the militiamen discovered the other half of the documents. The information obtained by the militiamen on November 25 enabled them to set up a trap at the home of a photographer, whose business at 1, Strasbourg Street had become a Resistance mailbox. The couple who ran the store, Marcel and Marcelle Boninn-Arthaud, (Note: The Boninn-Arthauds are deported, and only Madame Marcelle Boninn-Arthaud returns home.) were arrested there, followed by Edmond Gallet, Raymond Langlet and Anthelme Croibier-Muscat. (Note: Edmond Gallet, a 20-year-old student, and Raymond Langlet, a 17-year-old high school student, were both deported, but never returned. Anthelme Croibier-Muscat escaped from the Grenoble Gestapo, but was interned in the Drancy camp, where he was miraculously freed.)

At midday, Francis André's team, joined by Grenoblois from the Légion des Volontaires Français contre le Bolchevisme (Legion of French Volunteers Against Bolshevism), lunch at the Savoyard tavern on Avenue d'Alsace-Lorraine. Members of the "Paul Vallier" franc group, of which Gustave Estadès is deputy, warned of the arrival of this team of killers, and plan to intervene. Accompanied by a third member of the Resistance, they discreetly observed them at their table, but decided not to shoot them, as the restaurant was crowded and the area very busy. In the afternoon, Francis André's team returned to the trap. A new arrest is made at the photographer's home, of a Jewish man, René Mauss. (Note: René Mauss, was deported, never to return.) Worried that Anthelme Croibier-Muscat has been missing since morning, Gustave Estadès decides to go inside and fall into the trap. A few minutes later, Paul Vallier enters too, but Estadès raises his hands to show him the handcuffs. Paul Vallier immediately shoots through his jacket, wounding a member of the team of killers, and manages to escape. (Note: Paul Vallier, whose real name was Paul Gariboldi, was shot dead by the militia in Fontaine on March 22, 1944, to save the life of his friend Jean Bocq.) Estadès is violently interrogated at Gestapo headquarters at 6 p.m., then locked in a cell with three other people. He then met Dr. Valois; the two men had already exchanged letters but had never met. Three other Resistance members were arrested that day: René Lembourg and Maurice Taccola died in deportation, while Henri Arbassier was interned and released in August 1944.

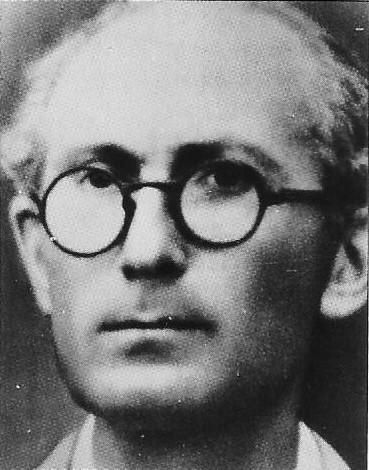
Jean Bistési

On November 28, three leaders of the Combat movement are arrested near Grenoble: Fernand Gras (Note: Fernand Gras, deported, never to return.) in Saint-Hilaire-du-Touvet, Georges Frier (Note: Georges Frier, deported but returns alive) in Voiron and Alfred Ducollet (Note: Alfred Ducollet, deported but returns alive) in La Mure. In the afternoon, the interrogations of Suzanne Ferrandini (Note: Suzanne Ferrandini, deported, never to return) and Henri Maubert (Note: Henri Maubert, deported but returns alive) begin, followed by the interrogation of Dr. Valois at 7:30 pm. The doctor was tortured throughout the night, and his interrogation ended at 5 am. Taken back to his cell, he asked Gustave Estadès to help him commit suicide. Using one of the two razor blades he had concealed, he slit his wrists with the assistance of Gustave Estadès. Estadès hid the second blade from the doctor and hastily applied a tourniquet to his arm, so as not to be accused of letting him die. At 7:30 a.m., the Germans discovered that Dr. Valois had committed suicide. (Note: Dr. Valois' body was found by a pedestrian on April 30, 1944, and identified by his dentures.)

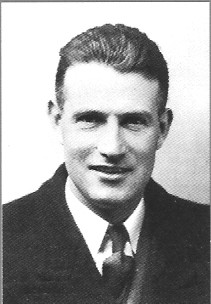
Jean Perrot.

On the morning of November 29, Dr. Victor Carrier, a member of the Mouvements unis de la Résistance, was arrested at his home in Saint-Marcellin. During the arrest, the doctor was shot dead, and his wife and the housekeeper were transferred to Gestapo headquarters on Berriat Avenue. At midday, while prisoners were being transferred to the building, Estadès tried in vain to inform Dr. Carrier's maid of Dr. Valois's death. (Note: Gustave Estadès (1916-1993) was then transferred to the Montluc prison in Lyon, where he was tortured for four hours. Sentenced to death, he was to be shot, but miraculously the Germans neglected to execute him. He was deported to Buchenwald and then to Dora, from where he managed to escape in 1945. He died of a heart attack in the Balearic Islands in 1993. In 2013, Pascal, his grandson, took part in a 34-minute film produced by the Grenoble General Council, recounting and commemorating Saint-Bartholomew in Grenoble.) At the same time, Professor Jean Bistési, the new departmental leader of the Combat movement, was executed outside the Institute of Electrochemistry and Electrometallurgy on boulevard Gambetta. At the same time, two men claiming to have been sent by Doctor Valois visited the home of industrialist Jean Perrot, head of the Francs-tireurs movement in Isère. Jean Perrot had his maid tell him that he was not at home. The two men indicate that they will visit him in the afternoon at his office in the Sappey factory. Jean Perrot thought of running away, but with no news from Dr. Valois and fearing that he might need help, he went to his workplace at 40 Road Bresson (now Rue Marcel-Perreto). At 4 p.m., Jean Perrot was seriously wounded by the two men who had just arrived at his factory. He died in hospital at 7pm. His brother-in-law, Jean Fouletier, also present on the premises, was more lightly wounded, arrested and deported to Germany, where he died on April 19, 1945.

Other Resistance fighters escaped the massacre, but on the same day, at around 6 pm, two German policemen arrived at the Trésorerie Générale de l'Isère on avenue Félix-Viallet. They asked to see former prefect Jean Berthoin, who had been in charge since August 1940. "German police! We have a few questions to ask you," they say. "I have a meeting to finish. I'll be with you as soon as I've finished," he explains. The two Germans agreed, then said they'd be back in twenty minutes. An hour later, when they didn't return, Berthoin ignored the pleas of his entourage to flee. He decides to phone the Gestapo to let them know that his meeting is over. The Gestapo, disconcerted by this phone call, evasively replied that their agents would return to the Treasury another day. Berthoin's initiative had saved his life.

On November 30, Albert Reynier, future Prefect of Isère, joined the Grésivaudan Maquis, narrowly escaping the killers who were raiding his apartment, and appointed his successor as head of the Armée Secrète in Isère, Commandant Albert de Seguin de Reyniès.

== Daily press coverage ==
In the days that followed, the Gestapo did everything in its power to hide these eleven crimes. Newspapers were forbidden to publish the death notices of the murdered resistance fighters, and only four family members, designated by the Gestapo, were allowed to attend the funerals of each of the victims. On November 28, 1943, the newspaper Le Petit Dauphinois announced the death of Roger Guigue, followed the next day by the deaths of Jean Pain, Dr. Girard and Alphonse Audinos. On November 30, identical information was published by the city's three daily newspapers, Le Petit Dauphinois, La République du Sud-Est and La Dépêche dauphinoise: "A series of attacks in Grenoble, nine dead", introducing a brief statement: "Grenoble experienced a frightful series of red attacks on Friday and Saturday. In almost identical circumstances, nine of our fellow citizens were shot dead with revolvers or machine guns, either in their homes or in the countryside". The list of victims follows, with this comment: "Is it necessary to add that this series of attacks has provoked strong emotion in our city, where everyone condemns the bloody violence which is putting the families of the Dauphiné region in mourning and adding further pain to the anguish of our people?"

This brief account leaves out the execution of Jean Perrot and the arrest of Dr. Valois. It includes at least one supporter of the Regime, the mayor of Saint-Martin d'Hères, Henri Gérente, who was shot dead by the Resistance on November 29. No comments other than those accompanying the list of victims are tolerated. No explanation can be given as to the exact nature of the attacks or who ordered them. This wave of executions of the main leaders of the non-Communist Resistance was partly due to careless language on the part of some of them. At the same time, judicial inquiries were opened, but Commissaire Toussaint and Inspector Hilke were deported by the Germans for being too persistent in their investigations.

== Jean Berthoin questioning ==
Senator Jean Berthoin was intrigued by the death toll from that bloody week. He noted that most of the Resistance fighters who had been shot belonged to the radical-socialist movement, wondering who had benefited from the crime, and not hesitating to accuse certain Resistance leaders of having pulled the strings behind the drama.

"The Radical Party was decapitated in November 1943," he writes in his Memoirs. "It was the radicals who were the victims of the executions. It's very curious. I often suspected of the Communists. None of the Resistance leaders were executed. Not a single one was arrested. In Grenoble, we hit people who weren't Communists. But the Communists were found again at the Liberation. I'm not saying they didn't do a good job in the maquis. They were lucky enough to escape - is this a coincidence or not? - from the Gestapo."

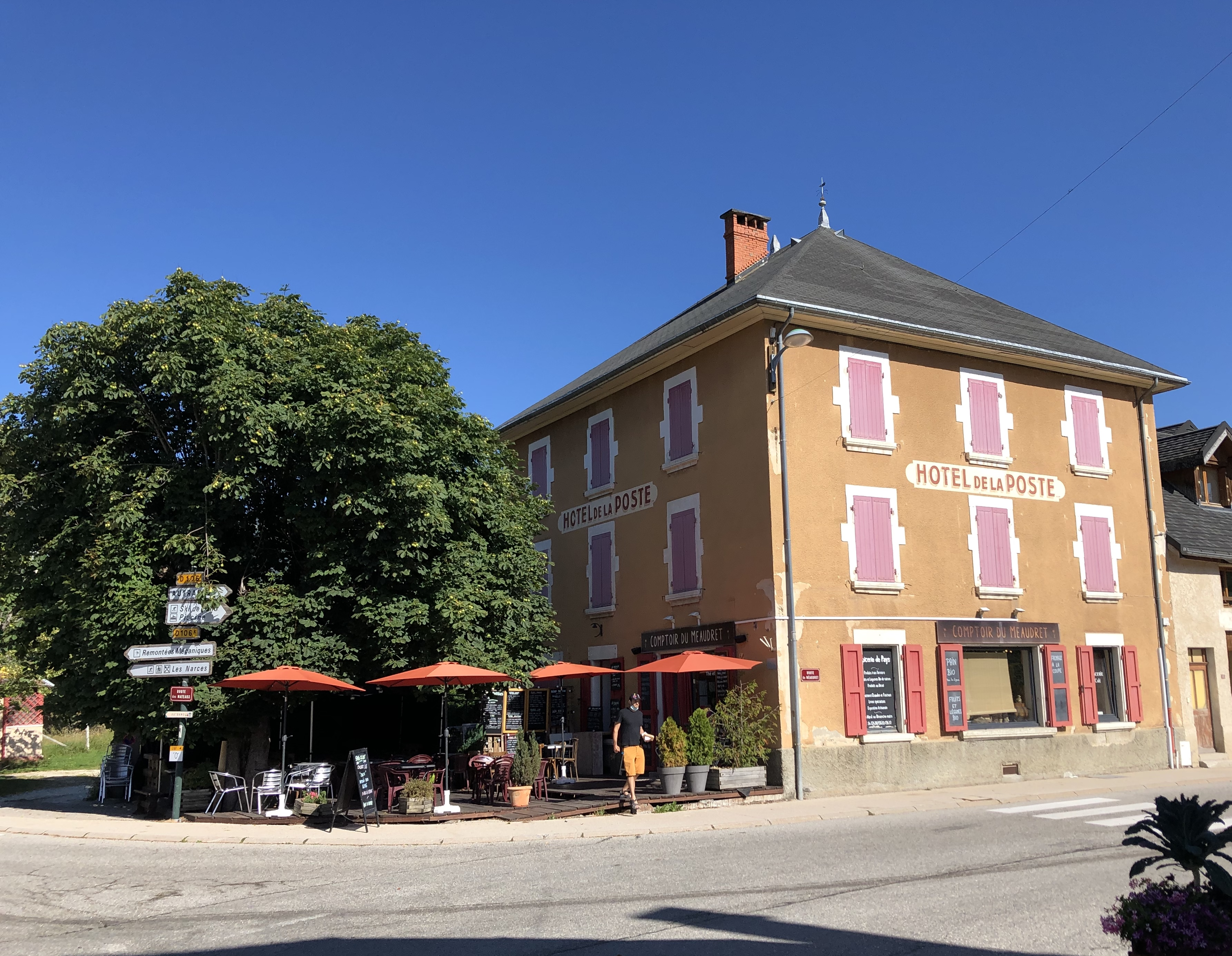
Hotel de la Poste in Méaudre, venue for the "Monaco" meeting.

The events that followed the massacres reinforced Berthoin's version. The disappearance of the radical Gaston Valois, regional leader of the Mouvements unis de la Résistance (MUR), left the field open to the radio engineer Pierre Flaureau (known as Pel), a communist activist with whom he and Léon Chevallet (known as Benoît), a Front National delegate, had joined forces on May 17, 1943, to form the Comité de la France Combattante de l'Isère et des Alpes dauphinoises. A few days after the bloody week, Flaureau and Chevallet took control of the committee. He took charge of the resistance in Grenoble, while his colleague took charge of the rest of the department. This new division of power led to the ousting of all MUR representatives. Rumors spread that Valois had betrayed the Resistance. Flaureau echoed this at the "Monaco" meeting held on January 25, 1944, at the Hotel de la Poste in Méaudre, which gave rise to the "Comité départemental de libération nationale" (CDLN). In his opening speech to the twelve delegates of the Dauphiné Resistance, none of whom was a member of the MUR, he said that Valois had betrayed his comrades in arms, and that he was living happily in the Midi as payment for his crime. Another participant follows his lead, discrediting the armed actions carried out by the network to which Valois belonged. At the end of the meeting, the Communist current won three of the five seats on the future CDLN executive board, including the post of secretary, which went to Flaureau.

== Intensified retaliation until the end of the war ==
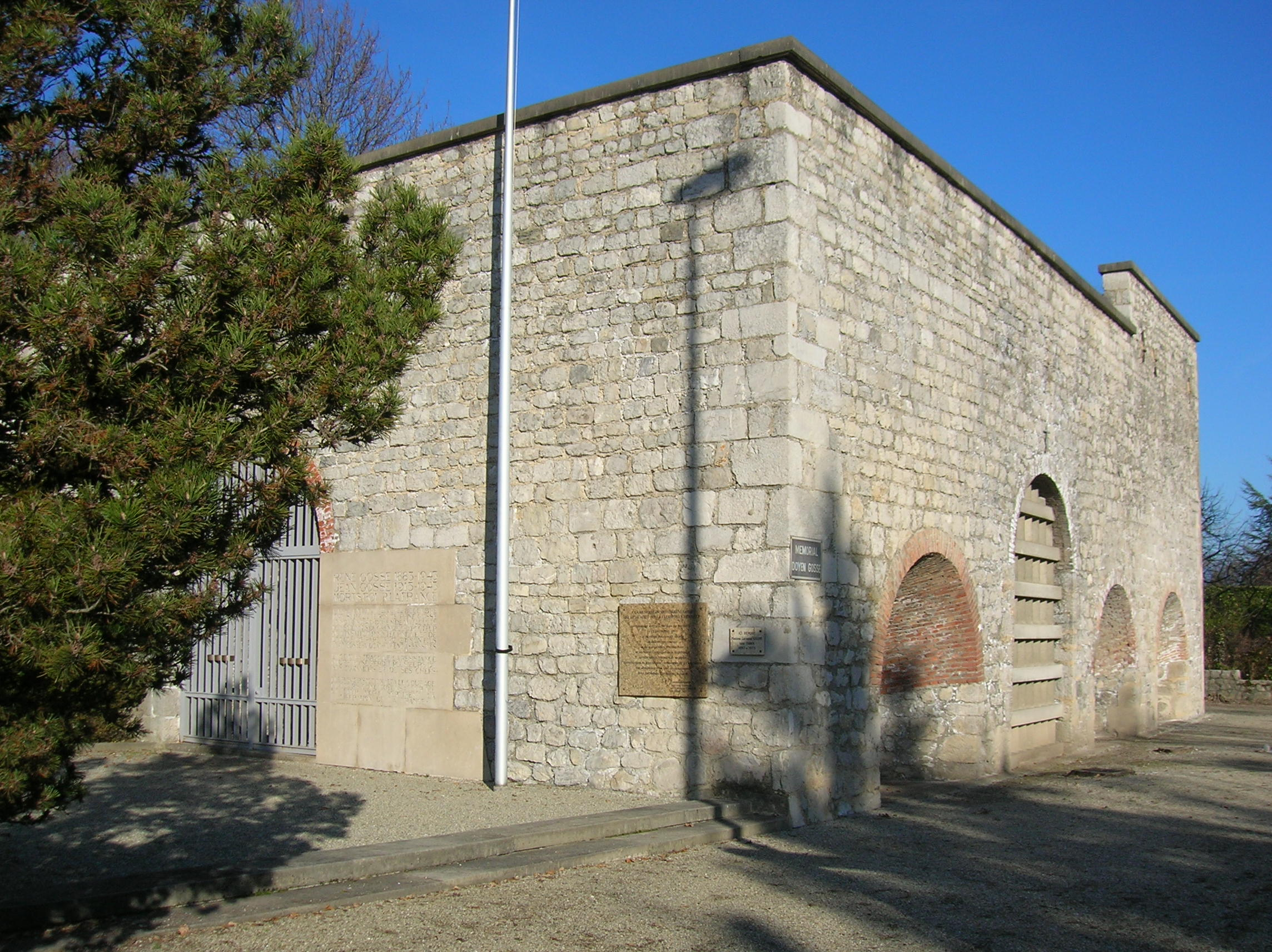
Memorial to Dean René Gosse in Saint-Ismier.

From December 1943 onwards, a policy of systematic retaliation for attacks by the Dauphiné resistance was established. Deportations and executions of resistance fighters followed the murders of militiamen and German soldiers. Three weeks after Grenoble's Saint-Bartholomew, René Gosse, former dean of Grenoble's science university between 1927 and 1940, and his son Jean Gosse were murdered by the Milice on December 21. Two days later, a roundup took place in Vaucanson Square, where the central post office was located, leading to the deportation of around one hundred people.

The most spectacular event was the attack on the German-occupied Bonne military barracks. On December 2, the 30 tons of explosives inside the barracks were detonated by Aloyzi Kospiski, (Note: Aloyzi Kospiski, who called himself Eloi, died at the age of 26 on August 20, 1944, in Domène during a clash with the Germans. Since 2006, a pedestrian walkway has been named after him along the Bonne barracks shopping mall.) a Polish resistance fighter who had been forced into the Wehrmacht. The explosion at 8.10 a.m. was so powerful that housing was severely damaged within a radius of one kilometer, and windows were blown out almost everywhere in Grenoble. Some houses were completely destroyed, while electricity was cut off in part of the city. Six German soldiers were killed and dozens more were wounded. Civilians were also among the victims: seven Grenoble residents living nearby were killed, and over two hundred were injured.

January 1944 saw the creation of the departmental committee of national liberation, but in February, when Alois Brunner passed through Grenoble, hundreds of Jews were deported. From June onwards, the Resistance in the nearby Vercors Massif took over some of the German soldiers stationed in Grenoble. On August 1, the Prefect of Isère, Philippe Frantz, a notorious collaborator, was executed by the Resistance. On August 6, a crucial meeting for the early liberation of Grenoble took place in Naples between French Colonel Henri Zeller, military commander of the southeast region, and General Alexander Patch, commander-in-chief of the Provence landings. Zeller, who had escaped from the fighting in Vercors two weeks earlier, managed to convince Patch to send part of his troops along the Route Napoléon, heading for Grenoble in order to pincer the Germans further north. A final tragedy under German occupation took place on August 14, 1944, when twenty young Resistance fighters arrested a few days earlier in the Vercors were shot on a vacant lot (now known as Square des Fusillés) at the end of Avenue Berriat, in retaliation for the death of two German soldiers.

Nine months after the Red Week, General Karl Pflaum, fully aware of the advance of Allied troops since the Provence landings, decided to break away from the fighting with the Maquis de l'Oisans and ordered the evacuation of German troops from the town on the night of August 21 to 22, 1944. The evacuation was immediate, with French prisoners abandoned in their cells in the Bonne barracks and administrative papers burned. After dynamiting the "iron bridge" and the Drac bridge, the Germans set off in an uninterrupted convoy of tanks, trucks, motorcycles and bicycles along the Boulevard des Alpes towards Gières and then Savoie.

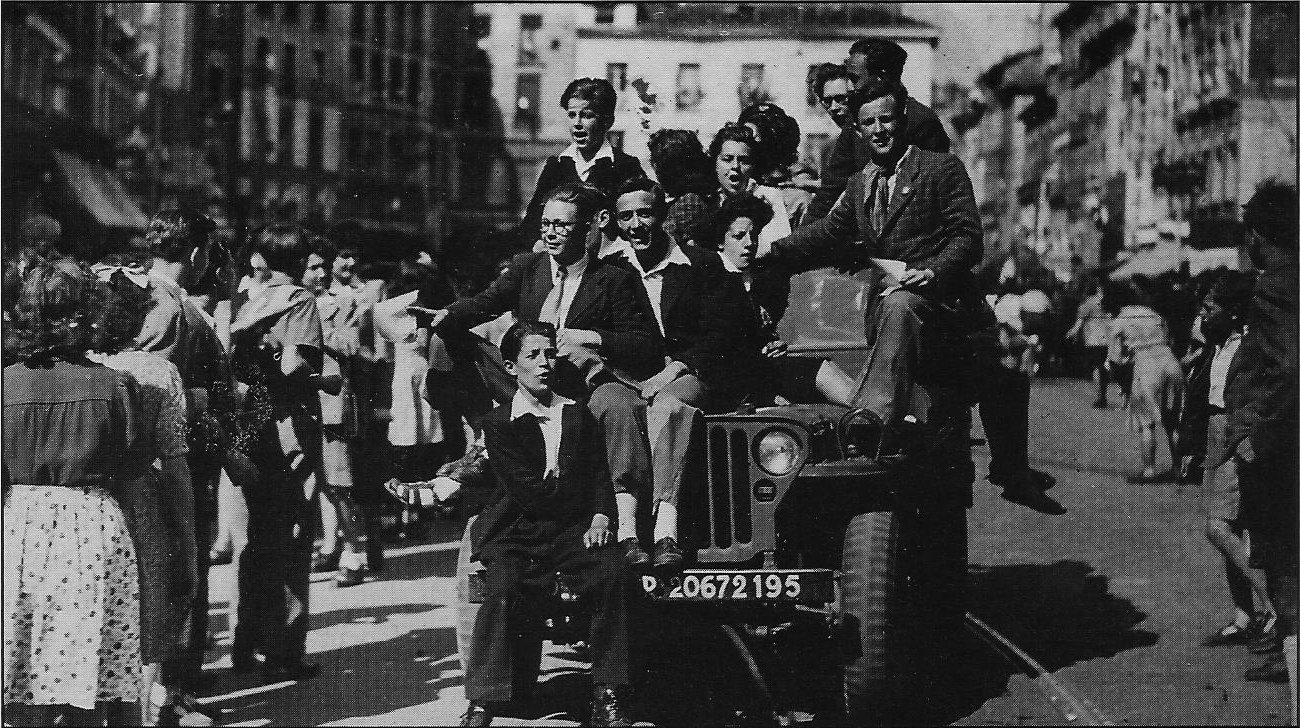
Grenette square, August 22, 1944.

At dawn on Tuesday August 22, maquisards from the surrounding massifs, members of the Groupes Francs and two French detachments parachuted into Grenoble from the Drôme on July 31, were followed around midday by the IIIrd Battalion of the 143rd Infantry Regiment, part of the US Army's 36th Infantry Division. Arriving from south of Grenoble via the Avenue Saint-André, the IIIrd Battalion, commanded by Lieutenant-Colonel Theodor Andrews, was accompanied by its corps commander, Colonel Paul Adams, who had landed seven days earlier on the beaches of Provence. With the German road signs torn down, the streets crowded with jubilant crowds and the bells ringing, Adams set up his headquarters at the Napoleon Hotel and made contact with Alain Le Ray, head of the Isère FFI, to prepare for the possibility of a German return. A new prefect, Albert Reynier, is installed, and a new mayor from the Resistance, Frédéric Lafleur, replaces Paul Cocat at around 5 pm.

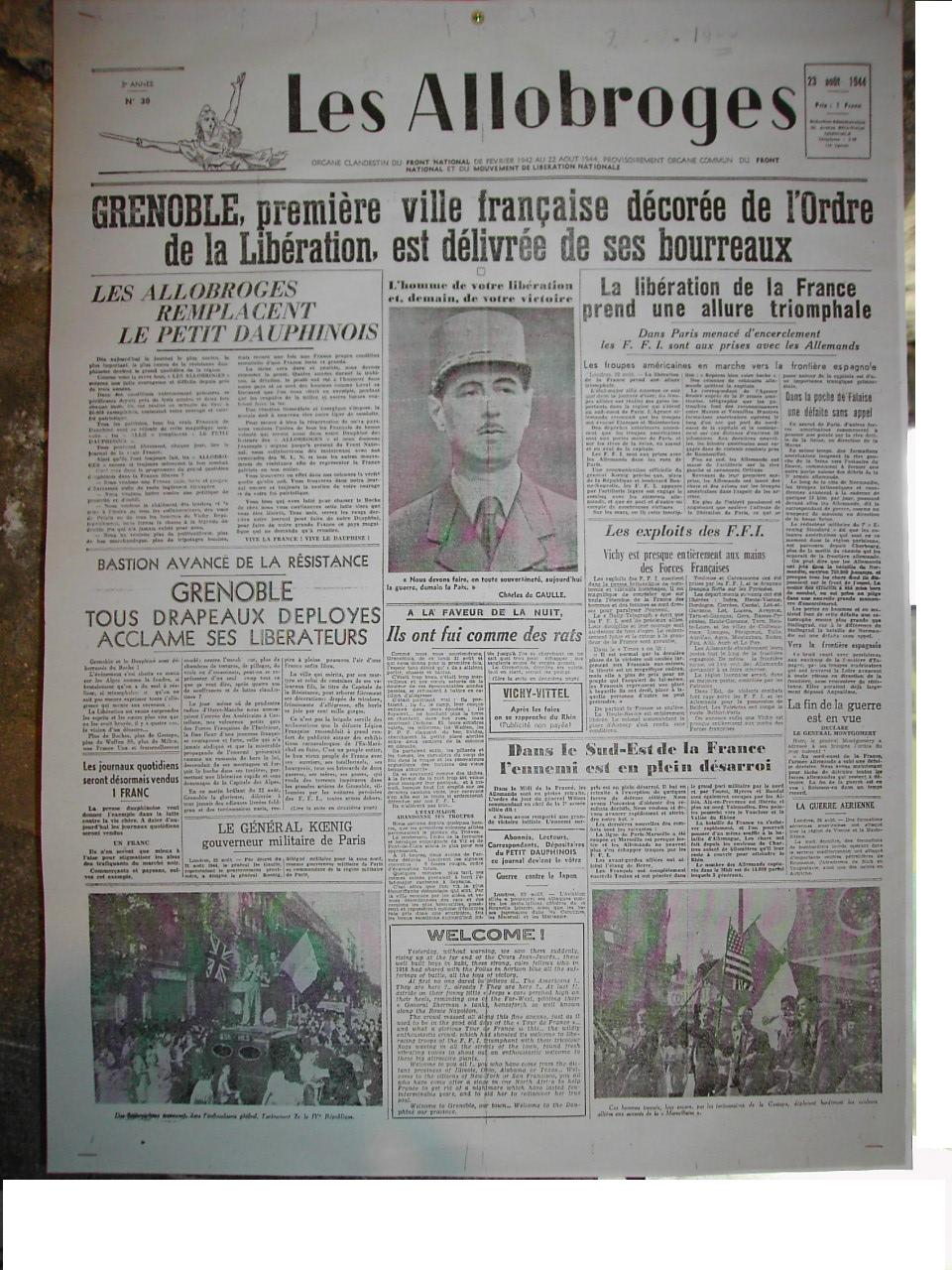
Les Allobroges daily newspaper (August 23, 1944, replacing Le Petit Dauphinois).

But the very next day, Adams was ordered to move towards the Rhone Valley, leaving the 179th Infantry Regiment of the 45th Infantry Division in the charge of Colonel Harold Meyer. Meyer tasked the leader of his 3rd Battalion, Lieutenant Colonel Philip Johnson, with protecting the city's northern front. But on the morning of August 24, against all expectations, some of the German troops who had turned back during the night returned to Domène and Gières and began firing artillery at Grenoble. The artillery duel with the American positions lasted all day, destroying German armored cars in Domène and an American tank at La Galochère in Saint-Martin-d'Hères. With the help of the maquisards, hundreds of German soldiers were finally captured on the evening of August 24 in Gières, after the Germans surrendered to French colonel Henri Zeller. However, a final misfortune befell the town when, on August 26, two mass graves totalling 48 corpses were found on the Mutte road near the artillery range. The following December, in tribute to these unfortunate members of the Resistance, the road leading to the gasworks was renamed Rue des Martyrs.

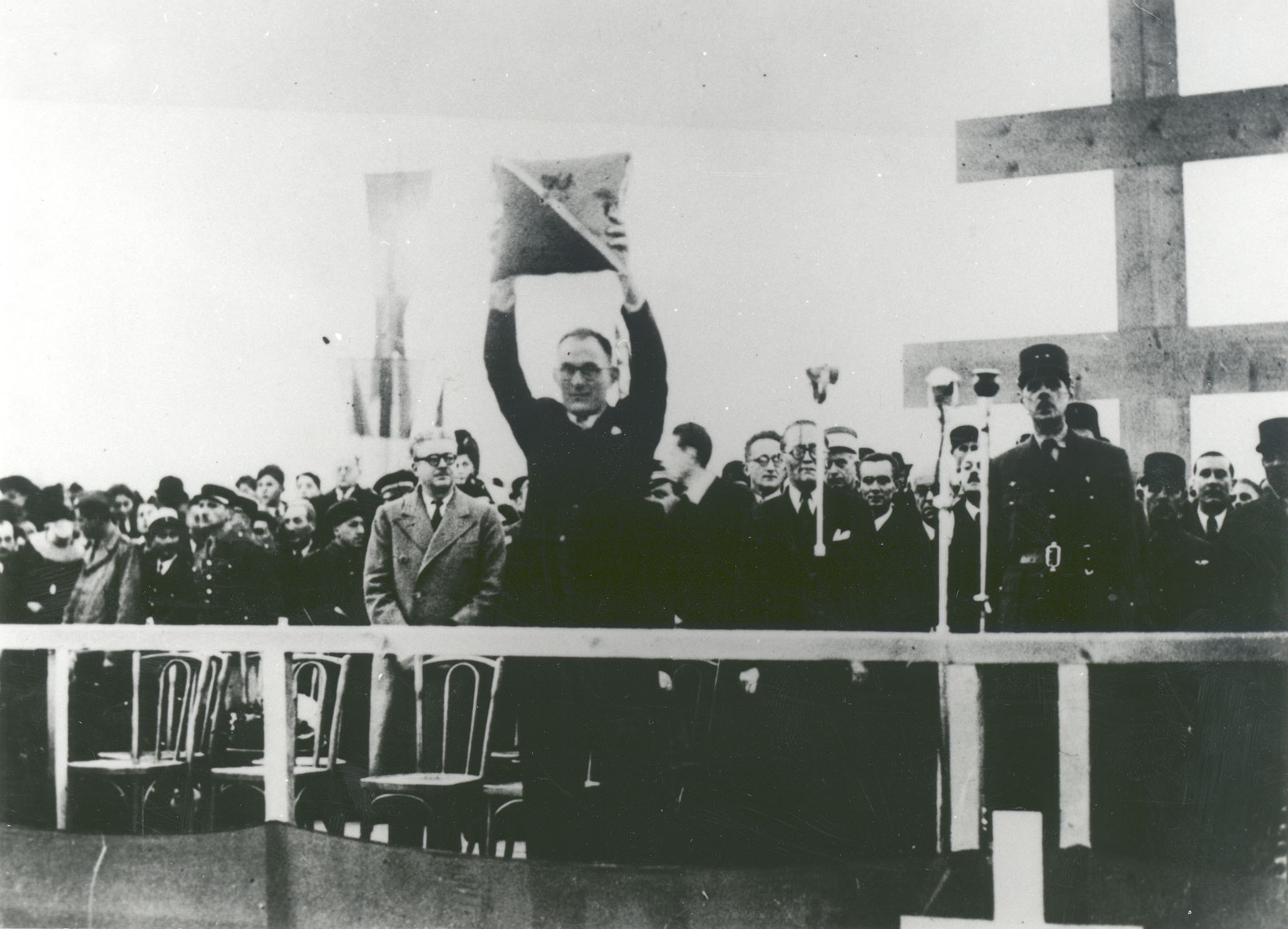
Mayor Frédéric Lafleur in Pasteur Square.

Considered too close to the occupying forces, the region's main daily, Le Petit Dauphinois, founded in 1878, printed its last issue on August 22, and was replaced the following day by Les Allobroges, a newspaper founded by the local Resistance. This marked the start of a brief period of score-settling among a population hunting down French collaborators with the occupying forces. The 1944 collaboration trials led to the execution on September 2 of six militiamen in the same square where the young resistance fighters had been executed by the Germans a month earlier. Women who had had intimate relations with the occupying forces were shaved and marched through the streets.

On November 5, 1944, just as the collaboration trials had begun two months earlier, and in front of a large crowd in Pasteur Square, Charles de Gaulle presented the medal of the Order of Liberation to Mayor Frédéric Lafleur, whose city became one of five French communes to receive it. (Note: The various daring actions in and around Grenoble received exceptional coverage in the British press. It's not surprising that General de Gaulle wanted to show his gratitude to the city and its resistance fighters (Collective (1990, p. 12))) The decree awarding the Order of Liberation to Grenoble had been signed by General de Gaulle on May 4, 1944. (Note: A reading of the decree awarding the Liberation Cross to the city of Grenoble (May 4, 1944) reveals that the demonstration on November 11, 1943 was an important reason for the award: "(...) Defying the prohibitions issued by the invader and his accomplices, [Grenoble] demonstrated on November 11, 1943, its certainty of victory and its determination to take part in it (...)".) In his speech, he evoked the period that had passed with these words: "Grenoble endured all that, but Grenoble at no point - who knows better than he who has the honor of speaking to it? - at no time has it renounced to itself, to freedom, to hope, to the Homeland."

== Condemnations ==
Numerous decisions in contumacy were handed down in the early months of 1945, concerning French people who had sided with the enemy and managed to leave the country to escape reprisals. Francis André, known as "Gueule tordue" (Twisted mouth), the main protagonist of this operation, and his henchmen, gathered around Barbie in the Côte-d'Or on August 21, 1944, then in Nancy. Protected by the Abwehr and the RSHA, they fled to Germany, with the PPF, and took refuge in Mainau. Shortly after Germany's defeat in 1945, Francis André was arrested, brought back to France and incarcerated in the Montluc prison in Lyon, where he had had so many people imprisoned. He was sentenced to death on January 19, 1946, and shot on March 9, 1946, at Fort Duchère at the age of 37.

Guy Eclache, one of Grenoble's leading collaborators, was named "public enemy number 1" at the Liberation, but managed to escape to Italy. Located in 1945, he was brought back to Grenoble by resistance fighters, including Pierre Fugain, to stand trial, and was executed in the artillery range on October 20, 1945.

As for the Girousse couple, after fleeing to Germany and then Italy, Antoine, a Mouvement Franciste representative in Grenoble, was executed on March 29, 1946, but his wife Edith was pardoned. The bishop of Grenoble, Alexandre Caillot, one of the most Petainist prelates in France, was not bothered and escaped the vindictive authorities. As for General Karl Pflaum, he was taken prisoner in Germany in February 1947, then released for health reasons in December 1951. He died in 1957 without trial.

== Commemorations ==
On December 1, 1946, the statue of Dr. Gaston Valois was unveiled in Félix-Poulat Street, against the façade of Saint-Louis church, in front of a large crowd. Every year, Grenoble's Saint-Bartholomew's Day is commemorated by the municipal and prefectural authorities. On November 14, 2002, the statue was transferred to the wall of remembrance at the end of the Avenue des Martyrs on the former military range, now a scientific polygon, where he now presides over his fellow Resistance fighters.

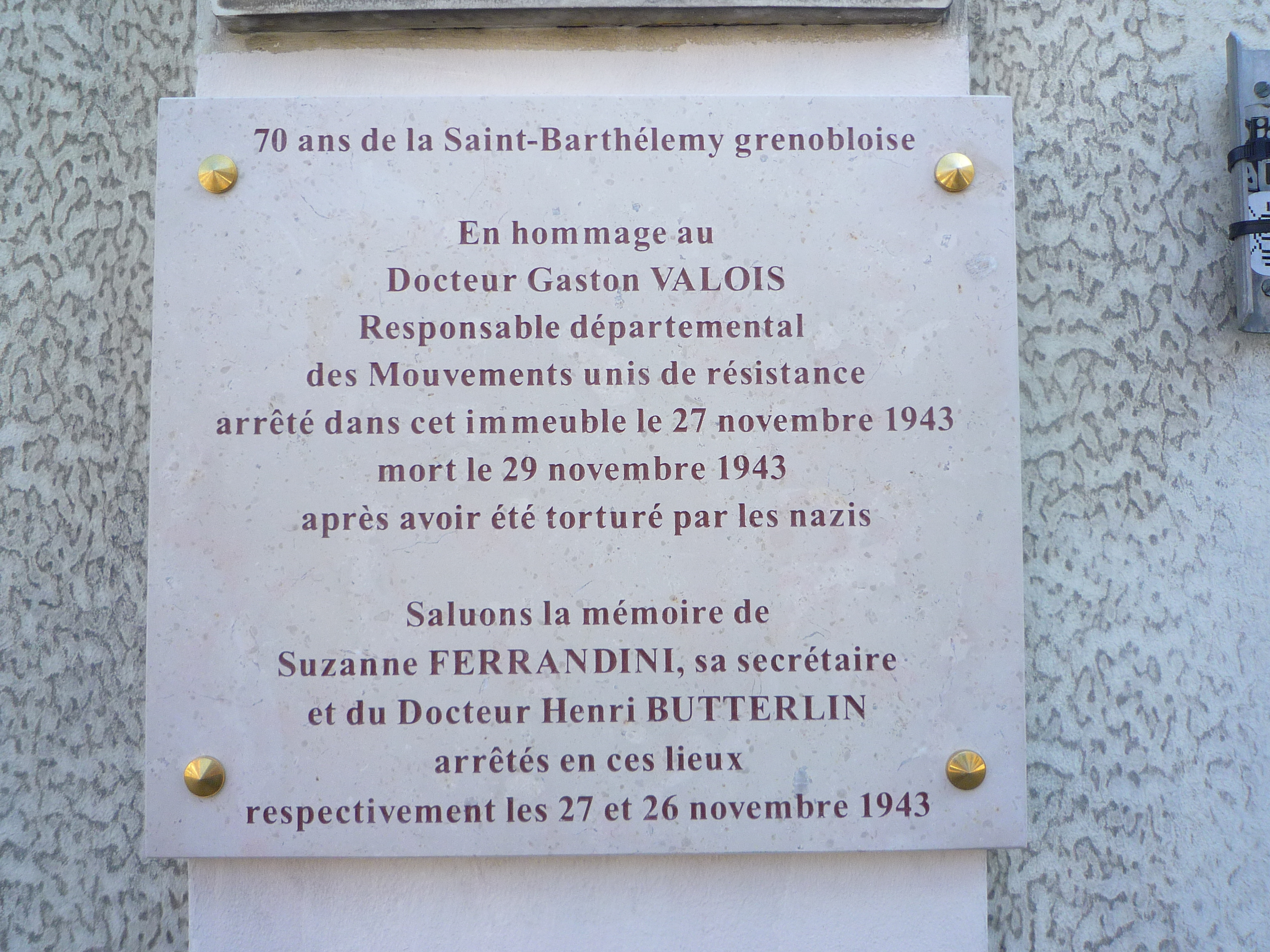
70th anniversary plaque.

In 2003, when one of the many books about this tragic period was published, historian Claude Muller recounted in his book Les sentiers de la liberté the testimony of a former Resistance fighter, Émile Farsat, who explained the origin of the expression Grenoble's Saint-Bartholomew: "This period was one of mad anxiety for the entire Dauphiné Resistance. We were all expecting to be eliminated. It was with the historic massacre of Protestants in mind that we later dubbed this catastrophic slaughter of the best among us the Grenoble's Saint-Bartholomew. A slightly exaggerated name, but one that accurately reflects this sad operation carried out by a bloodthirsty enemy, aided, alas, by French people unworthy of the name...".

In November 2013, to mark the 70th anniversary, the front page of Grenoble's municipal newspaper featured a mosaic of twelve photos of the victims of Grenoble's Saint-Bartholomew, and devoted four pages to the subject. The Musée de la Résistance et de la Déportation à Grenoble in Isère devoted a six-month temporary exhibition to the tragedy and on November 29, a plaque was unveiled at 5, Palanka Street in Grenoble, commemorating Gaston Valois at the place of his arrest.

== See also ==
- Musée de la Résistance et de la Déportation à Grenoble
- Battle of Vercors
- Police collaboration in Vichy France
