= Roger Judrin =

- Born: 26 July 1909; Paris
- Died: 14 December 2000 (aged 91); Compiègne
- Occupations: Novelist; Essayist

Roger Judrin (born 26 July 1909 – 14 December 2000) was a French writer and literary critic.

== Biography ==
Roger Judrin studied at the Lycée Henri-IV, followed the lessons of philosopher Alain and became a professor in 1933. Married in 1939, he was taken prisoner in 1940 in Strasbourg, sent to Pomerania to the camp of Neubrandenburg, from which he eventually escaped. He returned to France and settled in Compiègne in October 1941, where he lived until his death. From that date to 1970, he was a professor of Classical Letters at Lycée Pierre-d'Ailly.

Close to Jean Paulhan, with whom he maintained a long correspondence, he collaborated from 1953 to the Nouvelle Revue Française where he published remarked texts about Jean de La Fontaine, Louis de Rouvroy, Saint-Simon and Stendhal. He thus asserted himself as a great critic, with acute eyes and incisive style.

A discreet but prolific writer, he published numerous works belonging to genres as varied as novel, new, poetry, essay and biography. Among these works are a study on Montaigne, a biography of Saint-Simon and a collection of political portraits (Feu nos maîtres) (our deceased masters).

Adopting willingly the brief form, Judrin published collections of aphorisms in the minds of the moralists, small philosophical and literary portraits and poetic notations inspired by oriental wisdom (Boussoles, Ténèbres d'or, Printemps d'hiver).

He was praised by Paul Morand and Jacques Chardonne, who lauded him "an abrupt and natural writer", and was closely associated with Marcel Arland. Georges Perros. After Paulhan's death, he left Gallimard for Éditions de la Table ronde, which he helped to found.

== Bibliography ==
- Alfred Eibel, Dossier "Roger Judrin", Matulu issue 1 March 1971.
- 10 July 1997, dans les "Nuits magnétiques", France-Culture diffuse l'émission-portrait "A l'ombre de Roger Judrin" produshed by Catherine Soullard.
- 23 April 1994, France-Culture broadcast "Une vie une œuvre Marcel Arland", produced by Catherine Soullard, with among others, Roger Judrin as guest.
- Michel Mourlet, "A la rencontre de Judrin", in Écrivains de France, |XX, réédition augmentée, France Univers, Paris, 2011
