= René Maublanc =

French philosopher and historian

René Maublanc (17 July 1891 – 20 January 1960) was a French Marxist philosopher and historian.

== Biography ==
René Maublanc was born in to the republican middle-class family of a lawyer and professor of law Georges Maublanc. His studies led him to the École normale supérieure in 1911, where he obtained the agrégation in philosophy in 1919. After two years spent in the auxiliary services of the army, he was discharged.

Involved in the Human Rights League, in 1917 he was secretary of the Épernay section, a town where he was assigned as a history and geography teacher, before being appointed at the start of the 1919 school year to Bar-le-Duc. He then became involved in teacher unionism and recommended affiliation to the CGT, which earned him a trip to Algiers for a year.

Assigned to Reims in 1921, he received a new sanction the following year from the school inspector for union activity. However, he obtained at that date a position as secretary-archivist at the Social Documentation Center of the École Normale Supérieure. He then promoted the collection of Charles Fourier's archives, by publishing in 1924 his Hierarchy of Cuckolding. In 1927 he obtained a position as professor of philosophy at the École alsacienne, but his participation in the strike of February 12, 1934 the school management requested for his departure. He then obtained a position at the Beauvais high school, which he held for two years, before returning to Paris, to the Henri-IV high school in 1936.

He continued his literary activity, publishing in 1929 the poetic works of Georges Chennevière. Until the war, he continued to publish works of fiction, literary works, and political texts. Maublanc became active within a group of Marxist intellectuals, close to the Communist Party, who sought to disseminate Marxist thought. Most of them were, like Maublanc, members of the Cercle de la Russie neuve, which became the Association for the Study of Soviet Culture. They included Paul Langevin, Henri Wallon, Marcel Prenant, Marcel Cohen, Georges Cogniot and Jean Baby.

He joined the Comité de vigilance des intellectuels antifascistes and castigated in a pamphlet entitled "Pacifism and the Intellectuals", the "integral pacifism" of those who had just taken over the leadership of the committee, pushing the communists and sympathizers of the Communist Party into the minority. A member of the Association des écrivains et artistes révolutionnaires (AEAR), he denounced in the journal Commune, the spirit of "capitulation to fascism" after the Munich Agreement.

During the Second World War he joined the active Resistance. He was director of the Université Libre in the autumn of 1943, after the execution of the founders of this publication, Georges Politzer, Jacques Decour and Jacques Solomon, he then joined the national committee of the Front national universitaire. At the same time, he also served as editor-in-chief of La Pensée libre, the title given to the journal La Pensée in clandestinity. He then joined the Communist Party in the same year.

After the Liberation, he also worked towards the unification of secondary school teachers' unionism, participating in the discussions which led to the birth of the SNES. He was briefly chief of staff to Henri Wallon, appointed Secretary General of the Ministry of National Education after the Liberation, he then returned to his post at the Henri-IV high school. He continued his work as a member of the editorial board of L'École laïque, campaigned for the Union française universitaire, the Union rationaliste and, as editorial secretary, devoted a good portion of his time to the monthly review La Pensée.

== Works ==
=== Books ===
- Cent haï-kaï, Maupré, Le Mouton blanc, 1924
- Derradji, fils du désert, Larousse, 1927
- Yvonne au pays de Derradji, Larousse, 1929
- La Philosophie du marxisme et l'enseignement officiel, Les Cahiers de contre-enseignement prolétarien, No. 19, juillet 1935
- Bébert et le jeune châtelain, Éditions sociales internationales, 1935
- Le Pacifisme et les intellectuels, Publications du Comité mondial contre la guerre et le fascisme, 1936
- La Société et les classes, Paris, Bureau d'Editions, 1936–1937
- A la lumière du marxisme : socialisme utopique et socialisme scientifique, Association pour l'étude de la culture soviétique, 1938
- La France en péril, Paris, Editions de Paix et Liberté, 1938
- Esquisse d'une morale républicaine : notes d'instruction civique pour la renaissance française, Paris, La Bibliothèque française, 1945
- Le Marxisme et la liberté, Paris, Éditions Sociales, 1945
- Les Problèmes de la liberté, Paris, 1947

=== Collaborative Works ===
- Une éducation paroptique : la découverte du monde visuel par une aveugle, avec Leïla Holterhoff Heyhn, Gallimard, 1926
- Cours de marxisme : première année, 1935-1936 : les classes, l'égalité, la liberté, l'État, l'individu, socialisme et communisme, avec Jean Baby et Georges Politzer, Paris, Bureau d'éditions, 1936
- Fourier, avec Félix Armand, Paris, Éditions sociales internationales, 1937
- Paul Langevin, avec René Lucas, Paris, Union rationaliste, 1953
- Philosophies d'aujourd'hui, avec René Held, Paris, 1959
