= Jules Lagneau =

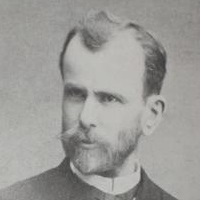
- Born: August 8, 1851; Metz, France
- Died: April 22, 1894 (aged 42); Paris, France

Jules Lagneau (August 8, 1851 – April 22, 1894) was a French spiritualist philosopher from Metz, known mostly through his lectures. He advocated the "reflexive method" as "the natural history of the soul." He influenced Alain. He was a franc-tireur in the Franco-Prussian War.
