= Pierre Courtade =

Pierre Courtade (3 January 1915 – 14 May 1963) was a French writer and journalist.

== Biography ==
Pierre Courtade was born in to a modest family of a post office employee.

A student of Jean Guéhenno, Courtade began his career as a journalist at Le Progrès de Lyon. During this period he met writers such as Louis Aragon, Roger Vailland and René Tavernier who greatly influenced him.

He joined the French Communist Party (PCF) during the Second World War while participating in the Resistance. In 1944, he was arrested at the Au Vieux Paris café in the company of fellow Communist resistance members. After the Liberation, he joined the editorial staff of the weekly L'Action, close to the Communist Party.

In 1946, Maurice Thorez asked him to hold the international section of L'Humanité which directed it until his death. In April 1948, he was in Genoa with Roger Vailland and Claude Roy to cover the major strikes taking place there. He also contributed to other Communist Party publications, including Les Cahiers du communisme, Démocratie nouvelle, L'Humanité-Dimanche. He was sent as a permanent correspondent for L'Humanité in Moscow.

Courtade decided to leave Moscow at the end of April 1963; his successor, Jean Kanapa, had already been appointed. Fifteen days after his return to Paris, he was hospitalized and died of cardiac complications.

== Works ==
=== Novels and stories ===
- Les Circonstances, recueil de nouvelles, Les Éditeurs français réunis (EFR), 1946 et 1954 (illustrated by Édouard Pignon); Le Temps des Cerises, 1991
- Elseneur, roman, La Bibliothèque française, 1949
- Jimmy, EFR, 1951 Paris in-12 Broché, 358 pages
- La Rivière noire, EFR, 1953
- Les Animaux supérieurs, recueil de nouvelles, Éditions Julliard, 1956
- La Place rouge, roman, Éditions Julliard, 1961; coll. «10/18», 1970; EFR, 1978; Temps Actuels, 1982
- Le Jeu de paume, roman, Le Temps des Cerises, 1997

=== Non-fiction ===
- Essai sur l'antisoviétisme, Éditions Raisons d'être, 1946
- Images de la Russie, Éditions du Chêne, 1947
- L'Albanie : notes de voyage et documents, Éditions Sociales, 1950
- Dessins de Louis Mitelberg, présenté par Pierre Courtade, Éditeur Le Cercle d'Art, 1953
- Khrouchtchev inédit, Éditions Sociales, 1960
- Roger Vailland et le héros de roman, introduction de Pierre Courtade, Legs Roger Vailland
