= Francis Delaisi =

French economist

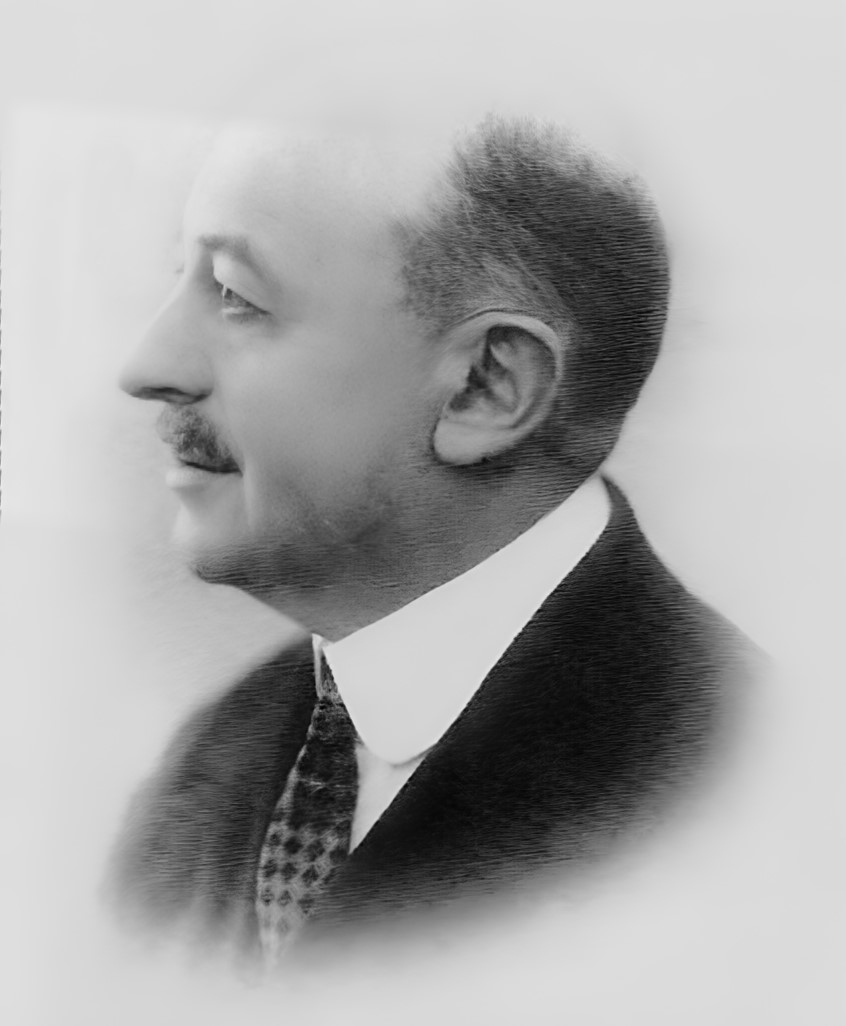
Francis Delaisi

Francis Delaisi (19 November 1873 – 22 July 1947) was a French economist.

== Honors and awards ==
Knight of the Order of Legion of Honour
