= Jeanne Gaillard =

French historian and Resistance member

Jeanne Gaillard (23 December 1909 – 19 September 1983) was a French historian and a member of the French Resistance during the Second World War.

== Biography ==
She was born as Jeannette Marie Rose Langlade at La Rochelle. Her father, a career officer, having been killed during the Gallipoli Campaign in 1915, she grew up at Béziers and received a scholarship to enable her to study history at Montpellier. After graduating in 1930, she became a teacher, holding positions at Guéret and Toulouse and, in 1936, at the Lycée Jules-Ferry in Paris, where she continued until 1950. In 1937, she met her husband Pol, and they were married in 1941. They had five children: Anne, Manuelle, Pierre, Luc and Roland.

Gaillard became a militant Communist. In 1940, she offered refuge to the physicist Jacques Solomon, a fellow teacher and editor of an underground magazine, L'Université libre, at her Paris home. Solomon was later arrested and executed by the occupying forces. Jeanne and her husband continued to participate in the production and distribution of the magazine.

After the war, she was a regular contributor to the multidisciplinary publication La Pensée. In 1950, she took up a teaching post at the Lycée Molière, but she was forced to leave in 1955, her health weakened by an earlier bout of tuberculosis. From 1964 to 1976, she worked as a "Maître-assistante" at the Paris Nanterre University, where she published many articles and obtained her doctorate in history; her thesis, Paris, la ville, accepted in 1975, is extensively quoted in historical research. Adrian Rifkin calls it "a long and complex chef d'oeuvre of urban demography", but criticises Gaillard's use of history to support the Marxist economic theories of Guy Debord. Parallels have been drawn between Gaillard's work and Walter Benjamin's Arcades Project.

Jeanne died in 1983 from an allergic reaction to a wasp bite.

== Published works ==
=== Monographs ===
- Communes de province, Commune de Paris 1870-1871, Paris, Flammarion, collection "Questions d'histoire", 1971.
- Paris, la ville (1852-1870), thesis presented at Paris Nanterre University 27 February 1975, Ed. Honoré Champion, 1976. 2nd edition (by Florence Bourillon & Jean-Luc Pinol), 1997, éditions L'Harmattan.

=== Articles ===
- Notes sur l'opposition au monopole des Compagnies de chemins de fer entre 1850 et 1860, in 1848. Revue des Révolutions contemporaines, 1950, Société d'histoire de la Révolution de 1848, bulletin No. 187, p. 233-249.
- La question du crédit et les almanachs autour de 1850, in Société d'histoire de la Révolution de 1848. Études, Bibliothèque de la Révolution de 1848, T. XVI, 1954, p. 79-87.
- La presse de province et la question du régime au début de la IIIe République, in Revue d'histoire moderne et contemporaine, Oct.-Dec 1959, p 295-310.
- Le VIIe arrondissement, in Les élections de 1869. Études présentées par Louis Girard, Bibliothèque de la Révolution de 1848, T. XXI, 1960, p 37-76.
- L'action des femmes, in La Commune de 1871, sous la direction de J. Bruhat, J. Dautry et E. Tersen, Paris, Éditions sociales, 1960 2nd ed. : 1970, p. 179-194.
- Les associations de production et la pensée politique en France (1852-1870), in Le Mouvement social, July-Sept 1965, p. 59-84.
- Le radicalisme pendant la Commune de Paris d'après les papiers de la Ligue républicaine des Droits de Paris, in Bulletin de la Société d'histoire moderne, n° 5, supplément à la Revue d'histoire moderne et contemporaine, 1966, no 1, p. 8-14.
- La Commune, le mythe et le fait, in "Annales ESC", mai-juin 1973, p. 838-852.
- Gambetta et le radicalisme entre l'élection de Belleville et celle de Marseille en 1869, in Revue historique, July-Sept 1976, p. 73-88.
- Réalités ouvrières et réalisme dans L'Assommoir, in Les Cahiers naturalistes, n° 52, 1978, p. 31-41.
- Une expérience de médecine gratuite au XIXe : l'arrêté d'Haussmann du 20 avril 1853, in Actes du 103e congrès national des sociétés savantes (Nancy, 1978) Colloque sur l'histoire de la sécurité sociale, Association pour l'étude de l'histoire de la sécurité sociale, 1978, p. 61-74.
- Zola et l'Ordre moral, in Les Cahiers naturalistes, n° 54, 1980, p. 25-32.
- La Comédie-française pendant la guerre de 70, in Revue d'histoire du théâtre, 1980-2, n° 126, p. 160-179.
- La petite entreprise en France aux XIXe et XXe, in Commission internationale d'histoire des mouvements sociaux et des structures sociales, Petite entreprise et croissance industrielle dans le monde aux XIXe et XXe, Paris, CNRS, 1981, T. 1, p. 131-187.
- Le Conseil municipal et municipalisme parisien (1871-1890), in Bulletin de la Société d'histoire moderne, 81e année, n° 13, supplément à la Revue d'histoire moderne et contemporaine, 1982, n° 1, p. 7-16.
- Gambetta, jeunesse et genèse d'un homme politique, in Ministère de la Culture, Délégation aux célébrations nationales, Hommage à Léon Gambetta, Musée du Luxembourg, 1982, p. 21-28.
- Quand on dansait à l'Hôtel de Ville, in Exposition du Centenaire de la reconstruction de l'Hôtel de Ville (1882-1982). Livre du Centenaire, Ville de Paris, Bibliothèque administrative, 1982, p. 115-118.
- La formation d'une élite : les médecins parisiens sous le Second Empire, in Bulletin du Centre d'histoire de la France contemporaine (Université de Paris-X Nanterre) n° 4, 1983, p. 125-131.
- Les intentions d'une politique fiscale : la patente en France au XIXe, in Bulletin du Centre d'histoire de la France contemporaine (Université de Paris-X Nanterre), n° 7, 1986, p. 15-38.
