= Alain (philosopher) =

French philosopher (1868–1951)

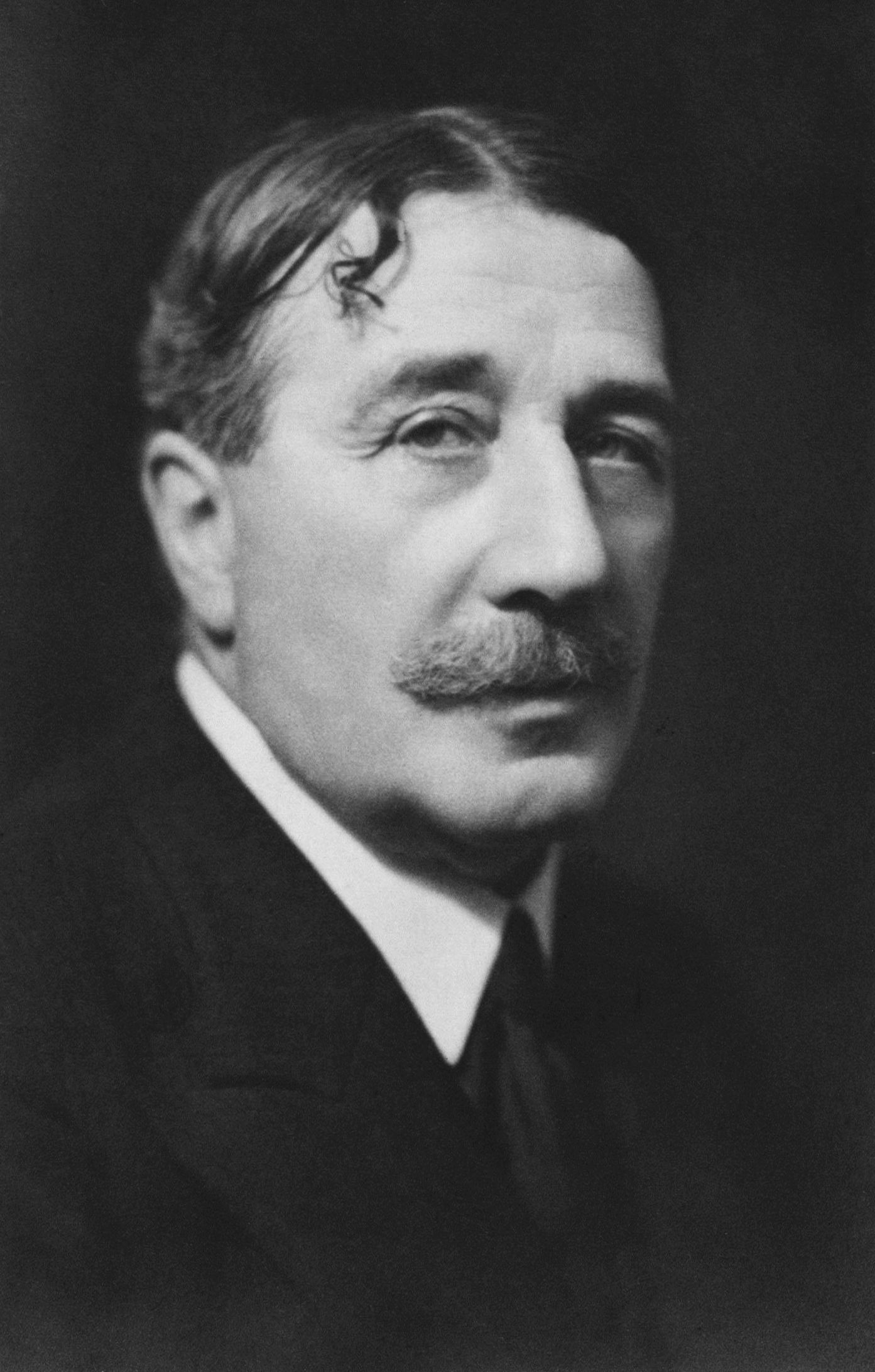
- Alain in 1931
- Born: Émile-Auguste Chartier; 3 March 1868; Mortagne-au-Perche, Orne, France
- Died: 2 June 1951 (aged 83); Le Vésinet, France
- Political party: Radical Party; CVIA
- Spouse: Gabrielle Landormy

Education
- Education: École Normale Supérieure (B.A., 1892)
- Academic advisor: Jules Lagneau

Philosophical work
- Era: 20th-century philosophy
- Region: Western philosophy
- School: Continental philosophy
- Notable students: Georges Canguilhem; Mikel Dufrenne; Simone Weil
- Main interests: Political philosophy

Émile-Auguste Chartier (French: [ʃaʁtje]; 3 March 1868 – 2 June 1951), commonly known as Alain ([alɛ̃]), was a French philosopher, journalist, essayist, pacifist, and teacher of philosophy.

== Life ==
=== Early life and teaching ===
Alain was born in 1868 in the rural town of Mortagne-au-Perche, Normandy, the son of a veterinary surgeon. After attending the local Catholic school, in 1881, he entered the lycée of Alençon, where he passed the examinations of the baccalauréat in literature (and failed the science baccalaureat). He proceeded to the Lycée Michelet in Vanves, a suburb of Paris, where he came under the influence of the philosopher Jules Lagneau. His exceptional intelligence led him to the École Normale Supérieure in 1889, and to the agrégation in philosophy in 1892. This qualified him for a career as a teacher of philosophy, which he pursued in schools in Lorient, Rouen, Paris and, in particular, the Lycée Henri IV from 1909, where he taught the prestigious preparatory classes to the École Normale. Sartre's career would begin in a similar way, forty years later. Alain taught at the Lycée Henri IV, with an interruption for the First World War, until his retirement in 1933, having chosen not to pursue a Ph.D. and teach in the university system. In these years he gained a reputation as an inspiring teacher; his students included major philosophers such as Simone Weil and Georges Canguilhem, writers such as André Maurois, Julien Gracq, and Roger Judrin, and even great political leaders like Maurice Schuman, a founding father of modern Europe. Alain's influence was felt beyond his class: Jean-Paul Sartre, and Simone de Beauvoir attended his public lectures, and Raymond Aron became a close acquaintance.

He adopted his pseudonym Alain as the most banal he could find. There is no evidence he ever thought in so doing of the 15th-century Norman poet Alain Chartier.

=== The propos ===
In 1903, as part of his political activity in support of the Radical Party in Rouen, he began contributing brief columns to the party's newspaper, La Depêche de Rouen et de Normandie. He called them propos, a difficult word to translate; it implies a proposal, a proposition and, most simply, remarks. In 1906 and after his move to Paris, Alain made writing these a daily commitment and one he continued right up to the outbreak of the First World War. By the time he wrote the last, in the train on his way to join his regiment, he had written over three thousand.

These short texts, written for a general readership and in a concise and vivid style, with striking sentences and aphorisms, soon attracted a loyal following. They were inspired by topical and everyday events; at first, he commented mainly on politics, but his philosophy and wide interests also became starting points for these improvisations. As Alain put it later, he found that he had a taste for firing arrows at passers-by to get them to look up from their path in life; he liked to provoke. And, as he himself wrote, by not thinking that philosophy was unsuitable for journalism, he invented a genre of journalism. To quote one admirer, the French Socialist leader Jean Jaurès, "the propos seem to me to be, in many respects, a masterpiece of French prose."

He began to write these again, at a slower pace and in other journals, principally Libres Propos, in 1921 and continued until 1936, to make a total of around five thousand. They reached an even wider public by being collected in book form, some by subject, so there have been volumes of propos on politics, education, religion, economics, nature, aesthetics, literature etc. The bestseller, a collection which has always remained in print in France is Propos sur le Bonheur (translated as Alain on Happiness).

=== World War I ===
As war approached, Alain campaigned in his writing for peace in Europe, and when war did come, without compromising his views and aged forty-six, he volunteered immediately. As he wrote, he could not stand the idea of remaining in civilian life, while the 'best', who included his own pupils, were sent to be massacred. He was assigned to the artillery where he served conscientiously as a telephonist on the front lines, and refused promotion to the officer ranks. In 1916, his ankle was crushed in the wheel of a cart carrying munitions to Verdun. After several weeks in hospital and an unsuccessful return to the front, he was transferred to the meteorological service and then demobbed in October 1917.

While convalescing, he began to write again, this time more substantial works. The first of these was Mars ou la guerre jugée (translated as Mars, or the truth about war), published in 1921. In this, he wrote that what he felt most strongly about the war was the slavery it led to, the scorn of officers for the ordinary soldiers, treating them as animals; the army was a huge machine aimed at keeping men in obedience for organised slaughter.

=== Writing ===
This wartime writing was the beginning of a prolific output on a variety of subjects. The first works to be published were Quatre-vingt un chapitres sur l'Esprit et les Passions, in 1917, and Système des Beaux-Arts, in 1920. In fact, he had written two academic books before the war, before he had adopted his pseudonym: his thesis at the École Normale on the Stoics, and a published volume on Spinoza. The first major work of the post-war years was Les Idées et les Ages, published in two volumes in 1926. Apart from the several collections of propos, there followed many books, including works on philosophy, Plato, Stendhal, Balzac, and Charles Dickens. In 1934 came a second major work, on religion, Les Dieux (translated as The Gods), followed two years later by his intellectual autobiography, Histoire de mes pensées. André Comte-Sponville has described his later work as 'the finest prose of ideas of the century'.

=== Later life and World War II ===
Through the 1930s, Alain was politically active as a prominent pacifist; in 1934, he was a co-founder of the Comité de vigilance des intellectuels antifascistes (CVIA). After retirement from teaching, many publications followed, with books published every year.

But he was also struggling against illness, which confined him to a wheelchair, as the Second World War started. His spirits revived with his marriage in December 1945 to Gabrielle Landormy, twenty years his junior, and with whom he had fallen in love nearly forty years before.

=== Death ===
Alain died June 2, 1951, in his home on the outskirts of Paris. He is buried in the Père Lachaise Cemetery.

== Controversies ==
In his youth, Alain supported Dreyfus and had many Jewish friends and pupils. The 2018 publication of his Journal inédit 1937–1950 drew renewed attention to several private remarks concerning antisemitism, and some commentators accused Alain of having expressed antisemitic views. In an entry dated 28 January 1938, he wrote, "I would like to rid myself of anti-Semitism, but I can't achieve this." Later entries have also been cited in discussions of his views, including a 19 September 1943 entry in which he wrote, "Fortunately anti-Semitism will finish … it's unfortunate that I ever tolerated this cruel madness," and a 1947 entry stating, "In my eyes equality is like the air we breathe. There's a huge injustice in even doubting equality of rights. And we must pounce upon the thought that a Jew doesn't have all these rights." Francis Kaplan has also discussed the question of antisemitism in Alain's writings.

== Philosophy ==
Alain did not develop a system; like most French philosophers of his generation, he distrusted systems, even though, contrary to most of his colleagues, he did show a deep interest in studying systematic philosophers. He was an early (and quite unique) commentator of Hegel, a thorough and favourable critic of Hamelin, and an admirer of Comte, three of the greatest systematic thinkers of the nineteenth and twentieth centuries. Despite the presence of his closely argued philosophical books, Alain is perhaps best placed in a tradition of French thinkers like Montaigne and Pascal. This comparison, favoured by André Maurois, was vigorously challenged by Georges Canguilhem who saw in this a way of denying "Alain his dignity as a philosopher." In the end, Alain's thought is a typically modern one, which expresses itself in a fragmented way and for which truth is always local, precarious and constantly to be revised. Its coherence is, nevertheless, undeniable and features a deep understanding of previous philosophers, from Plato through Descartes to Hegel and Comte, which correlates with the unity of his ideas and their expression in certain regular themes.

Alain is probably best known for his views on politics which argue for a radical liberalism concerned with the role of the citizen in a democracy. His was the first attempt at political engagement by a philosopher in the name of philosophy. A man of the left, but without any ideology, distrustful of ideology, he defends the rights of individuals and their freedom to think and act. The role of the citizen was summed up in a paradox: to both obey and resist; that is, obey the laws but resist power by all legitimate means. Alain remained a firm defender of democracy; on the international front, he was an untiring defender of peace.

This emphasis on individual freedom runs throughout his writing. "I have not thought about anything as much as about freedom of judgement". He liked the play on words in French of 'penser, c'est peser' – to think is to weigh. This can be expanded through a definition he gave of 'mind' (esprit): "which is at bottom the power of doubt, which is to raise oneself above all mechanisms, order, virtues, duties, dogmas, to judge them, subordinate them, and replace them by freedom, which only owes anything to itself." This link between the freedom of the mind and the freedom of the individual can be seen as providing the opening scene to the existentialism of the 1940s associated with Sartre, de Beauvoir and Camus.

Alain developed a theory of perception, influenced by Kant and Lagneau, that emphasized the role of the mind in perception and held that the world is grasped through ideas. He also wrote on the imagination, a subject on which he claimed some originality and with which Sartre engaged in both L'Imagination (1936) and L'Imaginaire (1940).

His later works, principally Les Dieux, discussed religion. Though no longer a believer, Alain examined religion as a form of human expression, especially in relation to paganism and Christianity. Michel Petheram notes that Alain treated the figure of Christ as representing a rejection of power and force. His philosophy is often associated with reflection, rational thought, and resistance to prejudice. In Propos sur la Religion, he wrote: "To think is to say no. Note that the sign for yes is that of a person falling asleep; while to wake up is to shake the head and say no."

== Works (selected) ==
- La théorie de la connaissance des Stoïciens (1891)
- Spinoza (1900)
- Éléments de philosophie (1916)
- Quatre-vingt-un Chapitres sur l'esprit et les passions (1917)
- Système des Beaux-Arts (1920)
- Mars ou la guerre jugée (1921)
- Propos sur l'esthétique (1923)
- Propos sur le christianisme (1924)
- Propos sur les pouvoirs (1925)
- Souvenirs concernant Jules Lagneau (1925)
- Sentiments, passions et signes (1926)
- Le citoyen contre les pouvoirs (1926)
- Les idées et les âges (1927)
- Esquisses de l'homme (1927)
- Propos sur le bonheur (1925)
- Onze Chapitres sur Platon (1928)
- Entretiens au bord de la mer (1931)
- Vingt leçons sur les Beaux-Arts (1931)
- Idées, introduction à la philosophie (1945)
- Propos sur l'éducation (1932)
- Les Dieux (1933)
- Propos de littérature (1934)
- Propos de politique (1934)
- Propos d'économique, (1935)
- Stendhal (1935)
- En lisant Balzac (1935)
- Histoire de mes pensées (1936)
- Avec Balzac (1937)
- Souvenirs de guerre (1937)
- Les Saisons de l'esprit (1937)
- Propos sur la religion (1938)
- Convulsions de la force (suite à Mars) (1939)
- Minerve ou De la sagesse (1939)
- Vigiles de l'esprit (1942)
- Préliminaires à la mythologie (1943)
- Propos sur des philosophes (1961)
- Souvenirs sans égards (2010)
- Lettres aux deux amies (2014)
- Journal inédit (2018)

Gallimard's Pléiade series has published four collections:

- Two volumes of Propos 1956 and 1970 (containing some 1,250 propos)
- Les arts et les dieux, 1958
- Les passions et la sagesse, 1960

There is a complete edition of Les Propos d'un Normand covering the years 1906 to 1914, in nine volumes, published by the Institut Alain, 1990–2001.

=== English translations ===
- The Gods, 1974, New York, New Directions, and 1975, London, Chatto and Windus. Republished 1988, London, Quartet. A translation of Les Dieux by Richard Pevear
- Alain on Happiness, 1973, New York, Ungar, republished 1989. A translation of Propos sur le bonheur by Robert D. and Jane E. Cottrell.
- Mars, or the Truth about War, 1930, London; Toronto: Jonathan Cape. A poor translation of Mars by Doris Mudie and Elizabeth Hill, with an introduction by André Maurois.

== Sources ==
There have been two biographies:

- Sernin, André, Alain: un sage dans la cité, Laffont, 1985
- Leterre, Thierry, Alain, le premier intellectuel, Stock, 2006

Studies of his work include:

- Maurois, André, Alain, Editions Domat, 1950.
- Pascal, Georges, La Pensée d’Alain, Bordas, 1946 & 1957.
- Pascal, Georges, L’Idée de philosophie chez Alain, Bordas, 1970.
- Leterre, Thierry, La raison politique, Alain et la démocratie, PUF, 2000.
- Comte-Sponville. André, Du tragique au materialisme (et retour), PUF, 2015.
- Perrier, Jérome, Alain ou la démocratie de l’individu, Les Belles Lettres, 2016.
