= René Gosse =

French mathematician (1883–1943)

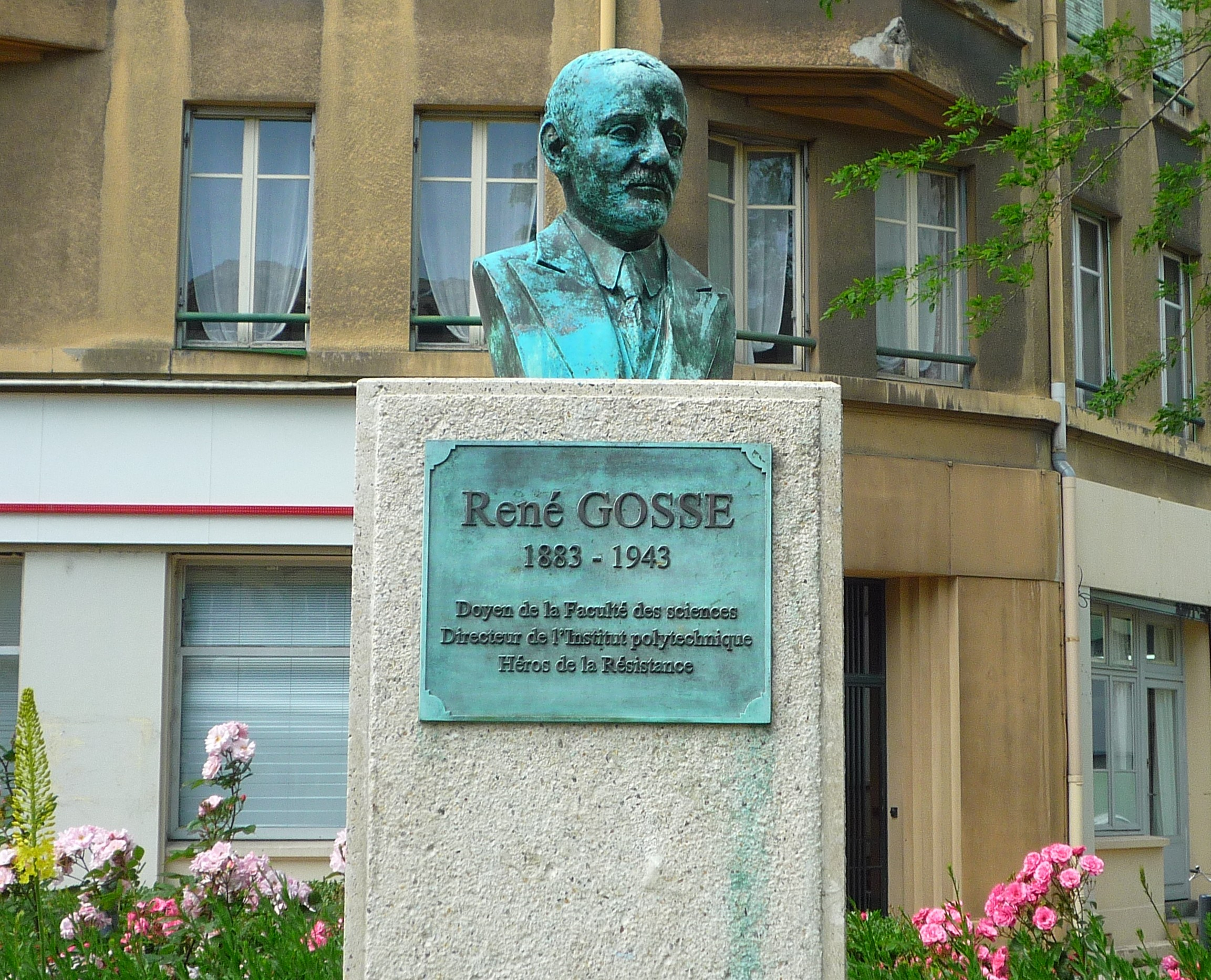

René Gosse (16 August 1883 – 22 December 1943) was a French mathematician who was Dean of the Faculty of Science at Grenoble. A Socialist and active anti-Fascist during the 1930s, he was a member of the French Resistance during the Second World War.
