= Léon Jaussely =

French architect & urban planner (1875–1932)

- Born: January 9, 1875; Toulouse, France
- Died: December 28, 1932 (aged 57)
- Education: École des Beaux-Arts, Toulouse Fine Arts School
- Occupation: Architect
- Awards: Prix de Rome (1903), Prix Chaudesaigues

Léon Jaussely (9 January 1875 – 28 December 1932) was a French architect and urban planner.

== Life ==
Born in Toulouse, Jaussely studied at the local fine arts school, then to the École des Beaux-Arts in the ateliers of Honoré Daumet and Pierre Esquié. Jaussely took the Prix de Rome for architecture in 1903, and would eventually run his own atelier at the school. Jaussely took the prestigious Prix Chaudesaigues.

As a young graduate he was the winner, among five entrants, of the city plan for the expansion of Barcelona. The Plan Jaussely was officially adopted in 1907 and although never completed, it guided the development of the city for decades.

Jaussely was also the chief planner of the 1925 International Exhibition of Hydropower and Tourism in Grenoble. Jaussely's individual building designs include the 1931 Palais de la Porte Dorée, built for the Paris Paris Colonial Exposition (with fellow architects Albert Laprade and Léon Bazin), and the 1932 headquarters for the La Dépêche du Midi in Toulouse. He was the co-founder in 1911 of the French Society of Planners, with Henri Prost and others. He was appointed Officer of the Legion of Honor.

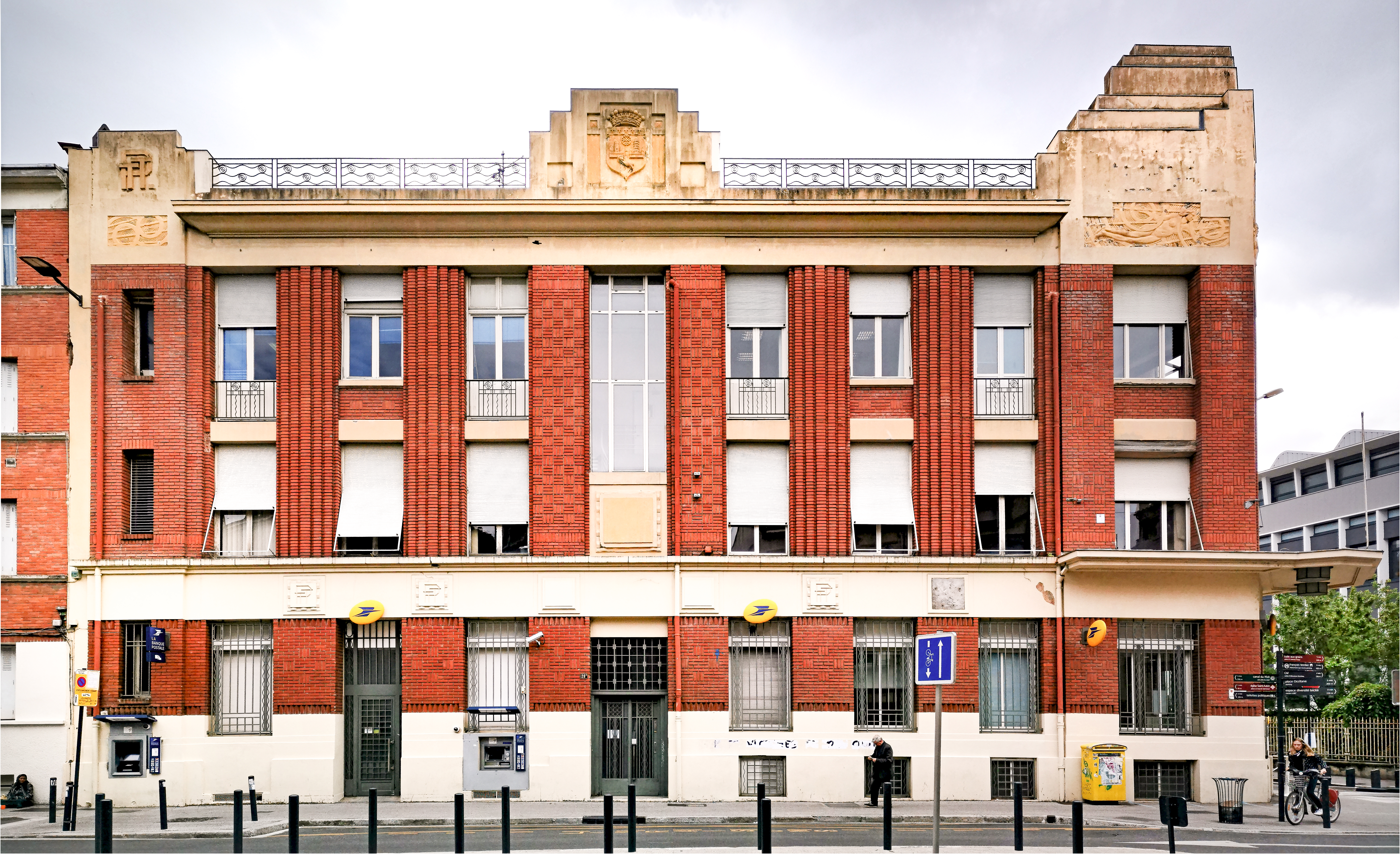
Postal office quartier St Aubin de Toulouse, 1928

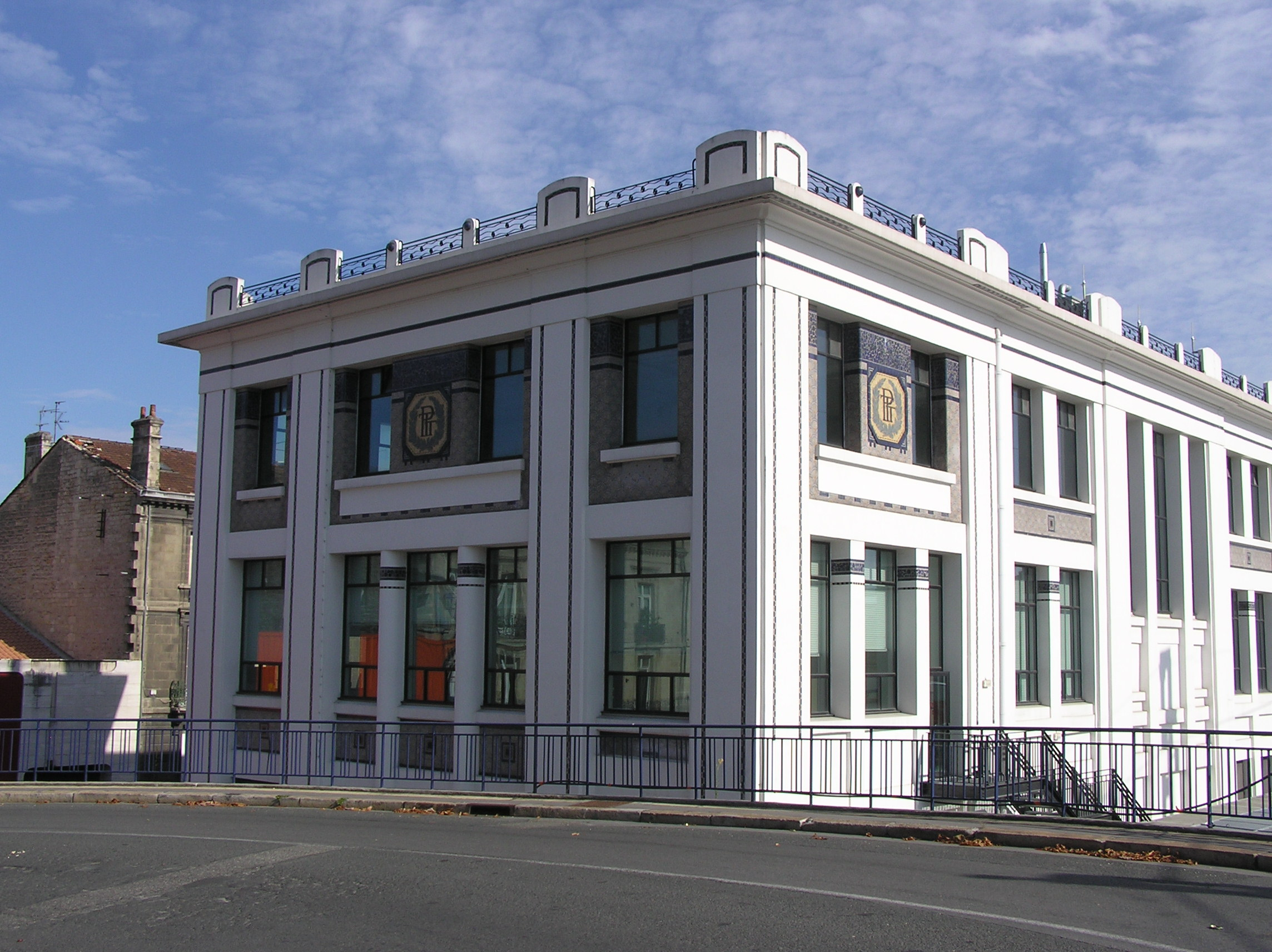
Postal office of Saint-Jean de Bordeaux, 1929

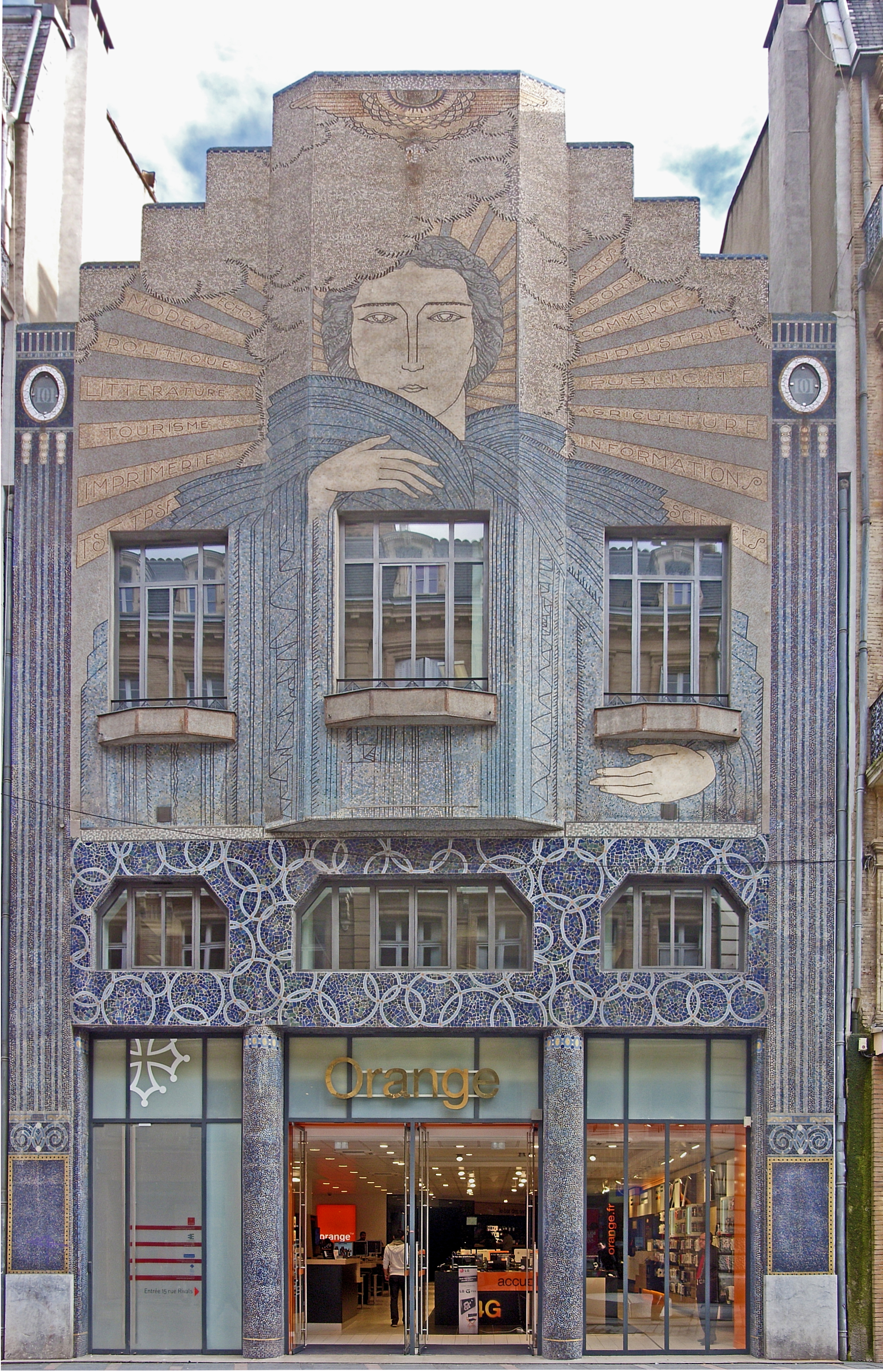
Building of La Dépêche, rue Alsace-Lorraine in Toulouse 1932

== See also ==
- Urban planning of Barcelona
