= Paul Mistral Park =

Park in Grenoble, France

Coordinates: 45.1854°N 5.7383°E

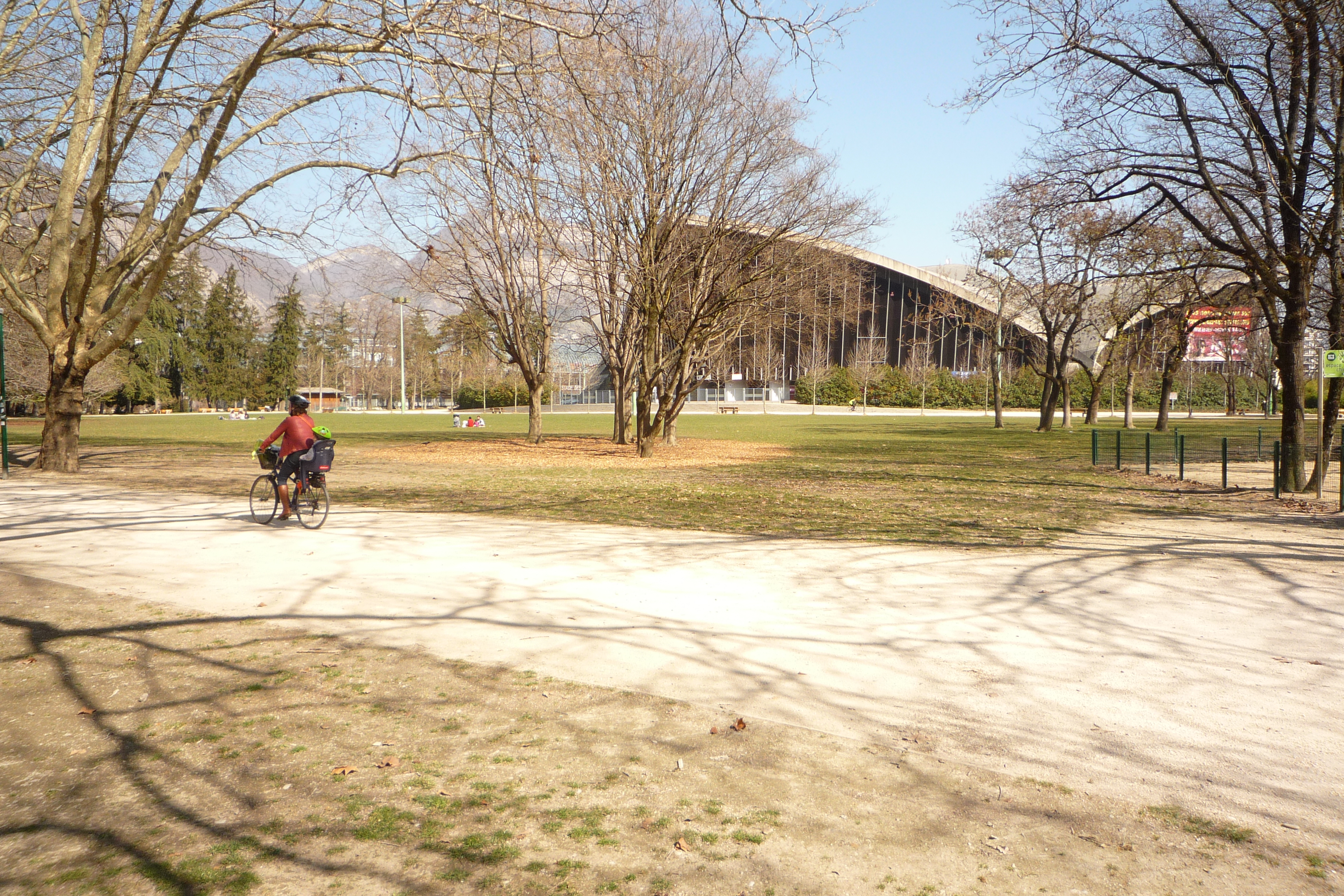
- Interactive map of Paul Mistral Park
- Type: Urban park
- Location: Grenoble, Auvergne-Rhône-Alpes, France
- Area: 67 acres (0.27 km^{2})
- Created: 1925
- Status: Open all year

Paul Mistral Park (Parc Paul Mistral in French) is an urban park located in Grenoble. It is 67 acres (27 ha) and it holds important sporting facilities and the city hall. Placed inside an old military engineering ground, it was created thanks to the International Exhibition of Hydropower and Tourism which took place in 1925.

== History ==
In 1836, after the general Haxo achieved to build the city's ramparts, the current area of the park is used as a military engineering place outside the town for shooting training. So, this area is reserved for the military needs only and none building is allowed. At this location was also the door, one of the five city's gates, the door of the Alpes ("Porte des Alpes" in French) which allowed people to go to Eybens or Vizille.

== The 1925 exhibition ==
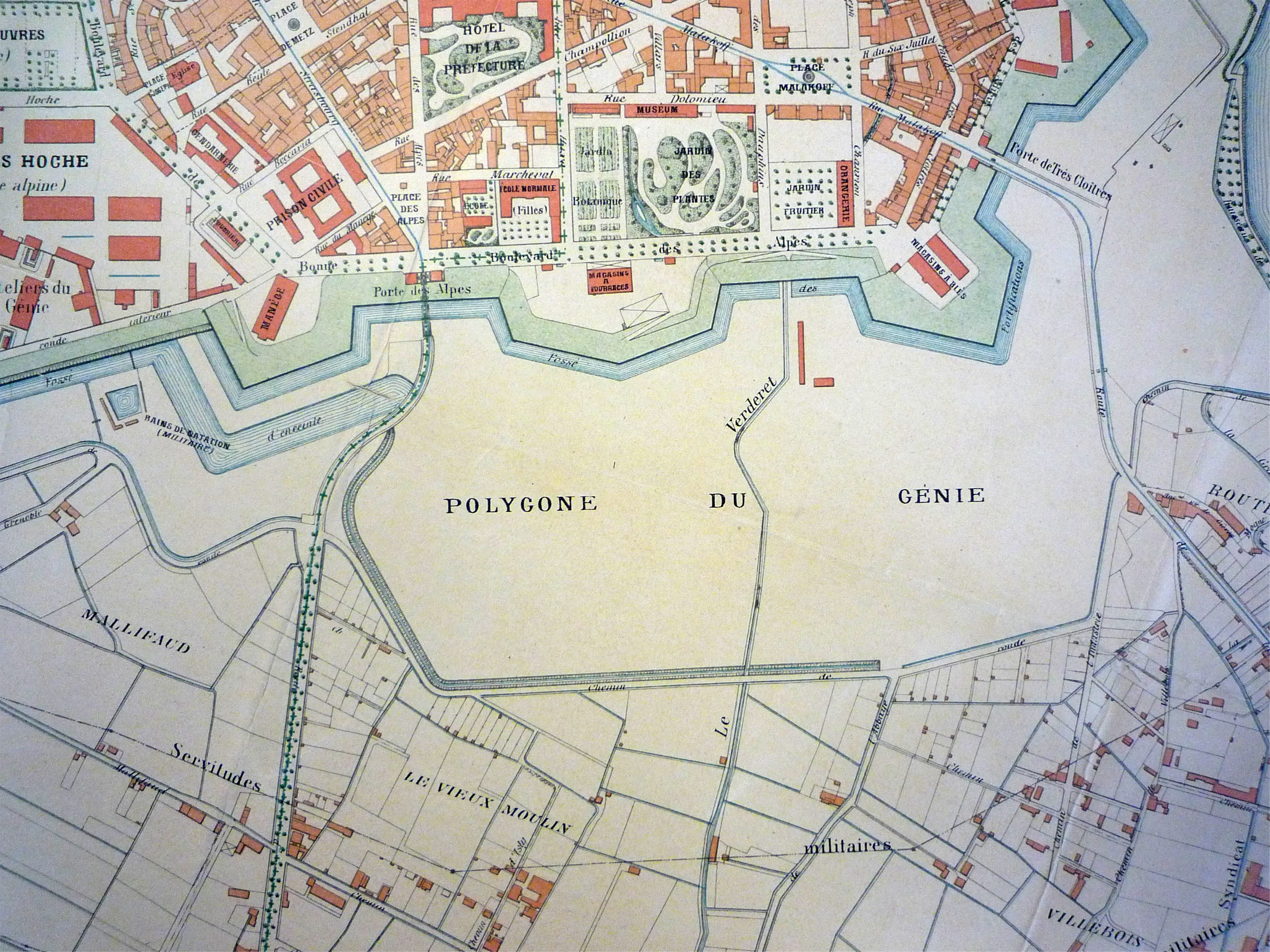
Quarter in 1902

In 1919, an ambitious mayor, Paul Mistral wished to open the city by destroying the Haxo ramparts. From 1921, thanks to the economic rising due to the use of hydropower, he planned to organize in Grenoble an international exhibition about hydropower and tourism. However, a such exhibition needed a vast ground near the city center and implied to destroy the southern ramparts.

Once the ramparts destroyed, the military engineering ground could be used and the new Alpes boulevard (became Jean Pain boulevard since 1944) is created at the North. The Eybens avenue is straighten up to go along the West side of the exhibition site.

At the southern side, the rampart walk became the Clemenceau boulevard, and at the East the Malakoff street is extended. Then, a new urban map is proposed by the parisian architect Léon Jaussely, to restructure the town. The International Exhibition of Hydropower and Tourism which takes place from 21 May to 25 October 1925 is visited by 1,050,000 people and includes various palaces and attractions. So, it was a great political and economic success for the mayor.

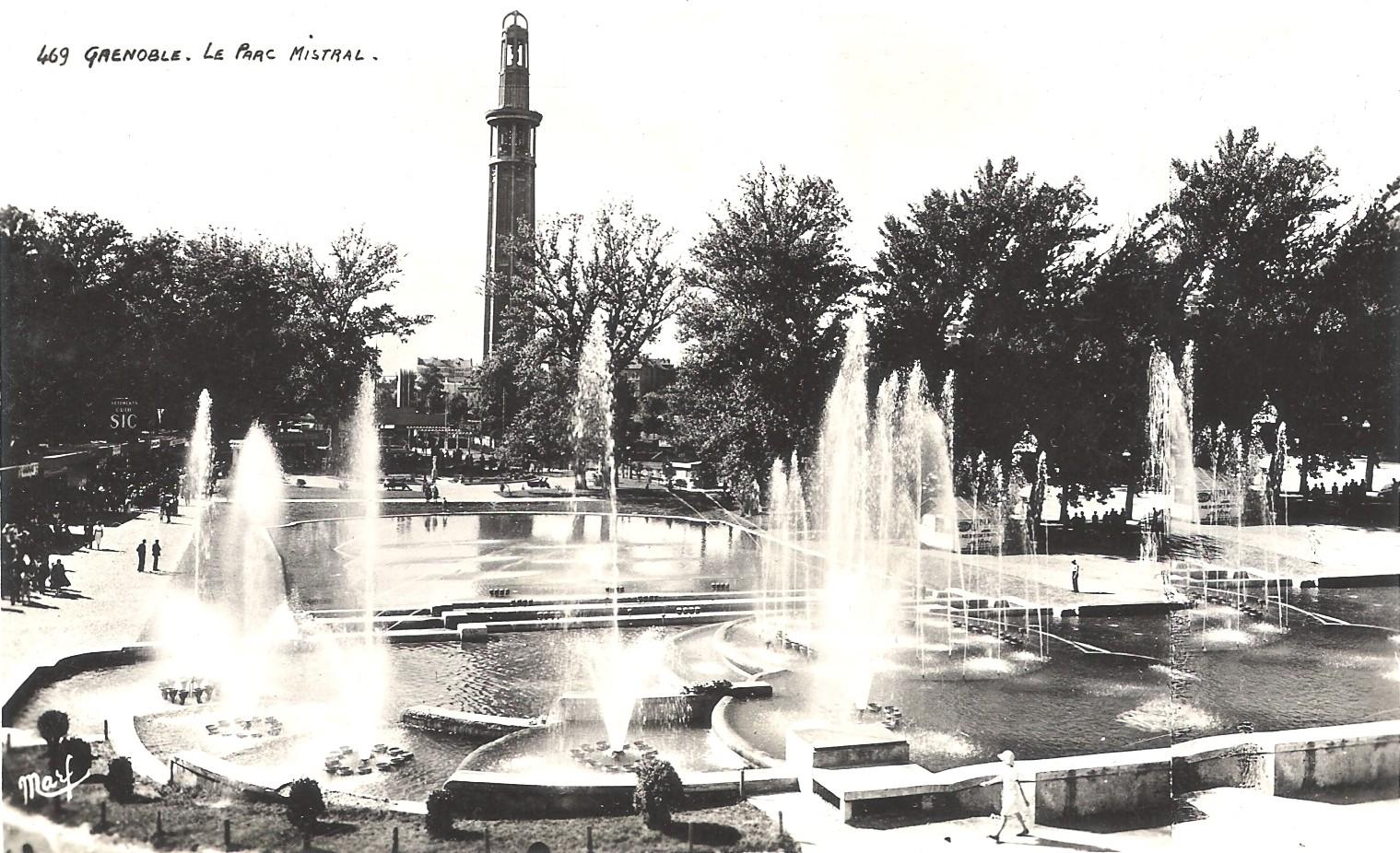
Fontaine and water basin in 1925

After the exhibition, the park still fenced in is opened to the public who is allowed only in the walks but the rate of frequentation is strictly regulated. In 1928, the installation of a carousel is refused by the town council. It's only from 1952 that children's attractions are installed. In July 1926, the depot used by visitors to park their car is destroyed. Various pavillons are bought by the city to Mr. Mornand and the fr:Touring club de France, 18 October 1926. Over years, these building are destroyed except the orientation tower named Perret tower from the name of its architect. The railway's palace and the hydropower's palace will serve both as exhibition's palaces until the mid-1960. In 1929, the city rent the modern house, an exhibition attraction to install the radio "Alpes-Grenoble". The Perret tower stays reachable with its two lifts and is the main attraction but another starts to compete with it: the zoological garden in which two famous bears lives with wolves, deer, roes, wild boars. These bears were offered to the city in 1925 by the Russian ambassador. The 8 February 1932, the Paul Mistral city council votes the building of the first sportive facility in the Park as requested by the cyclist societies. A "cyclist track" is built with rows of seats along the Clemenceau boulevard to avoid their members to go train on the esplanade of the door of France.

Due to the brutal death of the Paul Mistral, the city council session of 31 October 1932 directed by its first deputy, Adrien Ricard, decided to rename the exhibition park into Paul Mistral park.

== 1968 Winter Olympics ==
- 1968 Winter Olympics ice sporting events main complex.
- New sporting facilities : l'Anneau de Vitesse
- Palais des Sports
