= Hôtel de Ville, Grenoble =

Monuments historiques in Grenoble, France

Hôtel de Ville
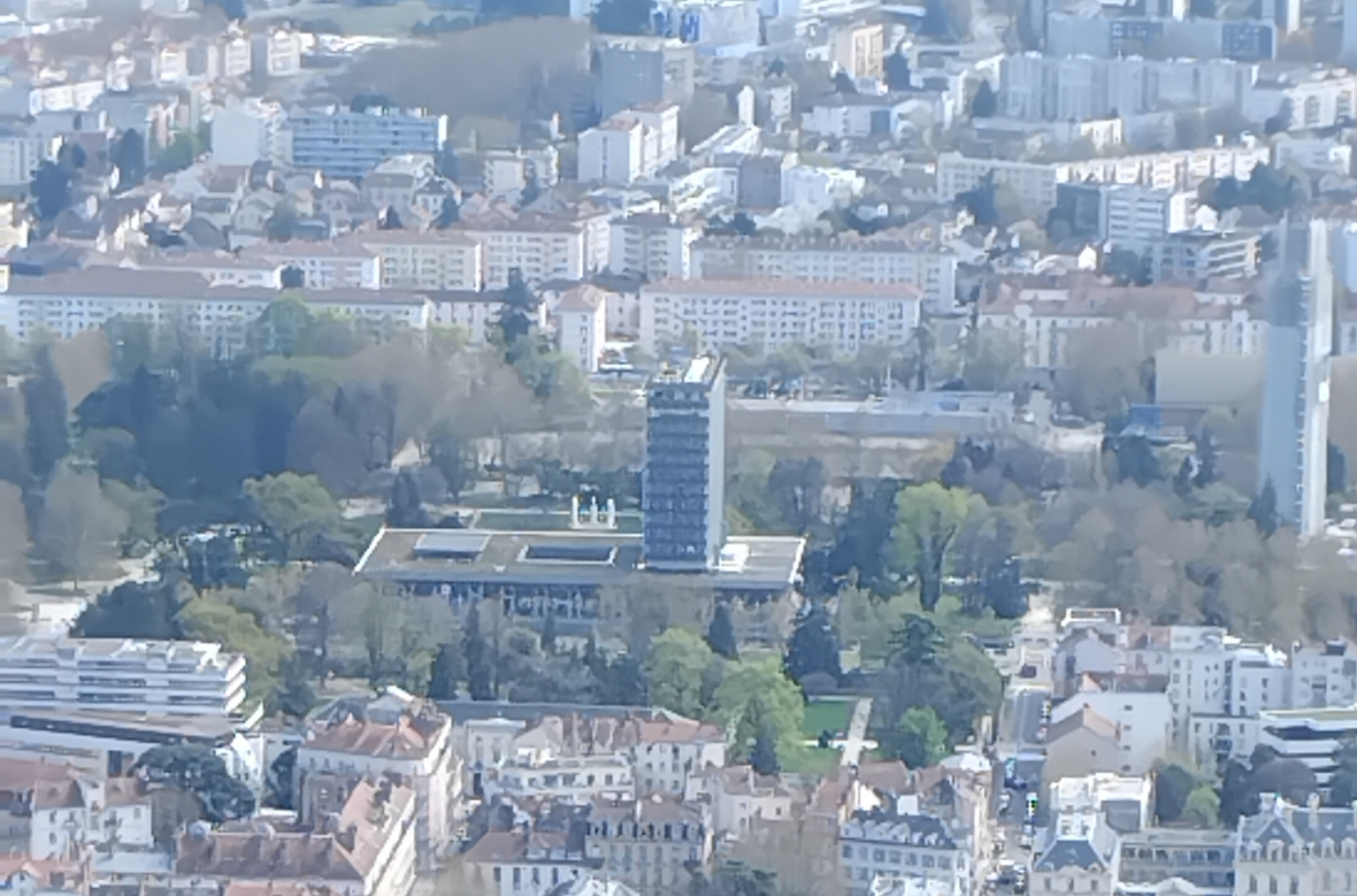
- The tower of the Hôtel de Ville in April 2025

General information
- Type: City hall
- Architectural style: Modern style
- Location: Grenoble, France
- Coordinates: 45.1864°N 5.7363°E
- Completed: 1967

Height
- Height: 46.5 metres (153 ft)

Design and construction
- Architect: Maurice Novarina

Monument historique
- Official name: Hôtel de ville
- Type: Inscrit
- Designated: 2023
- Reference no.: PA38000046

The Hôtel de Ville (French pronunciation: [otɛl də vil], City Hall) is the local seat of government in Grenoble, France. It was designated a monument historique by the French government in 2023.

== History ==
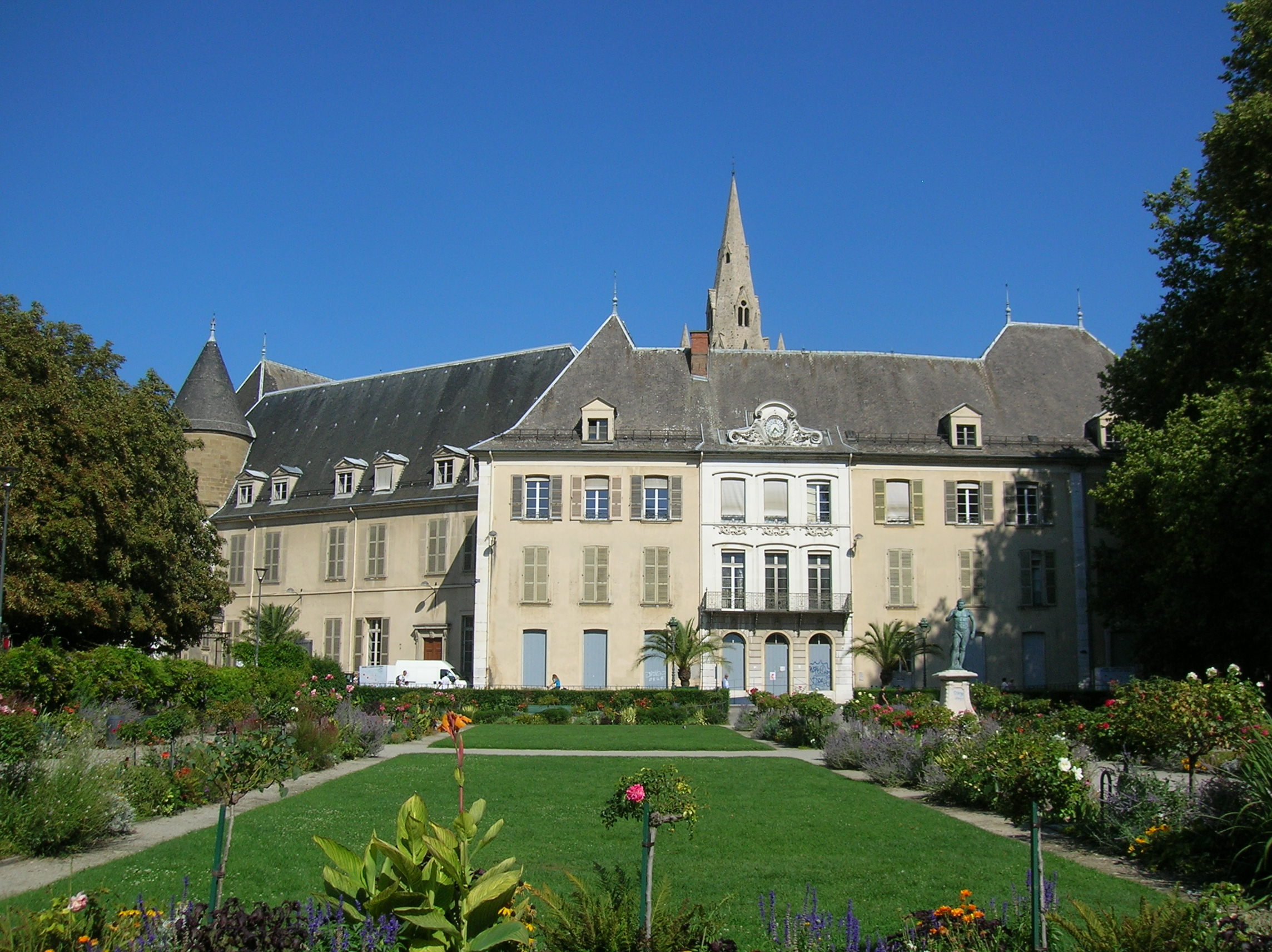
The Hôtel de Lesdiguières

The Hôtel de Ville was commissioned to replace the 17th-century Hôtel de Lesdiguières, which had been the home of François de Bonne, Duke of Lesdiguières and subsequent governors of Dauphiné. It became the local seat of government when it was sold to the city council in 1719. Following the liberation of the town by the French Forces of the Interior and the 1st Shock Battalion on 22 August 1944, during the Second World War, a plaque was unveiled in the forecourt of the old building to commemorate the event.

In the mid-20th century the city council decided to commission a modern building. The site selected for the new building, on the edge of Paul Mistral Park, was occupied by military buildings and was part of the site of the International Exhibition of Hydropower and Tourism in 1925. The project formed part of preparations for the 1968 Winter Olympics. The French Government gave approval to proceed in 1962 and construction of the new building commenced, using steel, glass, aluminium and concrete, in 1965. It was designed in the modern style and the main architect was Maurice Novarina, assisted by Jacques Giovannoni, Jacques Christin and Marcel Welti. The building was opened by interior minister Christian Fouchet, mayor Hubert Dubedout and sports minister François Missoffe on 18 December 1967.

The design involved a 12-storey tower, clad in a curtain walling designed by Jean Prouvé, sitting on a horizontal podium, accessible by a staircase. The foundations were between 15 metres (49 ft) and 18 metres (59 ft) deep, and the tower was 46.5 metres (153 ft) high. Internally, offices related to local government and the mayor were located on the ground floor, and those related to local services in the tower.

In March 2003, the building was one of several in Grenoble to be given the "Patrimoine du XXe siècle" (20th Century Heritage) status by the French state. In 2016, this status was succeeded by the similar "Architecture contemporaine remarquable" (Remarkable Contemporary Architecture).

In 2017, the City Hall was told that it failed modern fire regulations, particularly in relation to its tower and that the paper archives on the ground floor were a potential fuel source for a fire. In the early hours of September 2019, there was a fire in the council chamber, which authorities believed to be an act of arson.
