= Tour Perret =

Tour Perret may refer to:

- Tour Perret (Amiens), a skyscraper building in Amiens, France
- Tour Perret (Grenoble), an observation tower in Grenoble, France
