= Palais des Sports (Grenoble) =

Sports arena in France

Palais de Sports
- Palais des sports Pierre Mendès; Le Stade Olympique de Glace
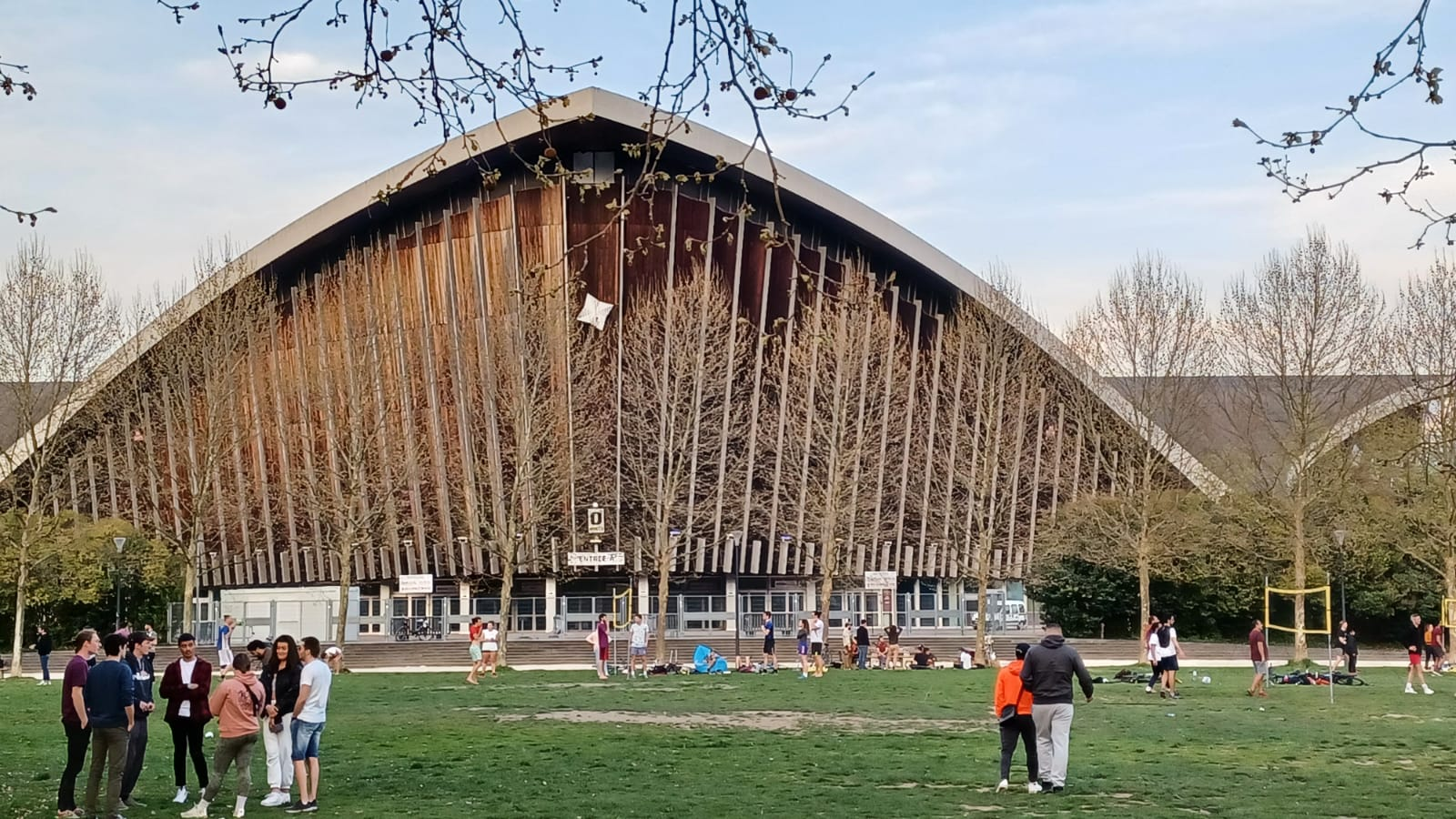
- Interactive map of Palais de Sports
- Location: Paul Mistral Park, Grenoble, France
- Coordinates: 45°11′8.03″N 5°44′26.25″E
- Capacity: 12,000

Construction
- Built: 1966–67
- Opened: 12 October 1967
- Renovated: 1985
- Architects: Robert Demartini; Pierre Junillion

Palais des Sports, known also as the Palais des sports Pierre Mendes or "Le Stade Olympique de Glace" is an indoor ice hockey arena, located in Paul Mistral Park in Grenoble, France. The vaulted roof structure was built from November 1966 to April 1967, therefore having tough weather problems to add to construction difficulties. The stadium was conceived for the 1968 Winter Olympics held in Grenoble in 1968 and has a capacity of up to 12,000 spectators.

== Events ==
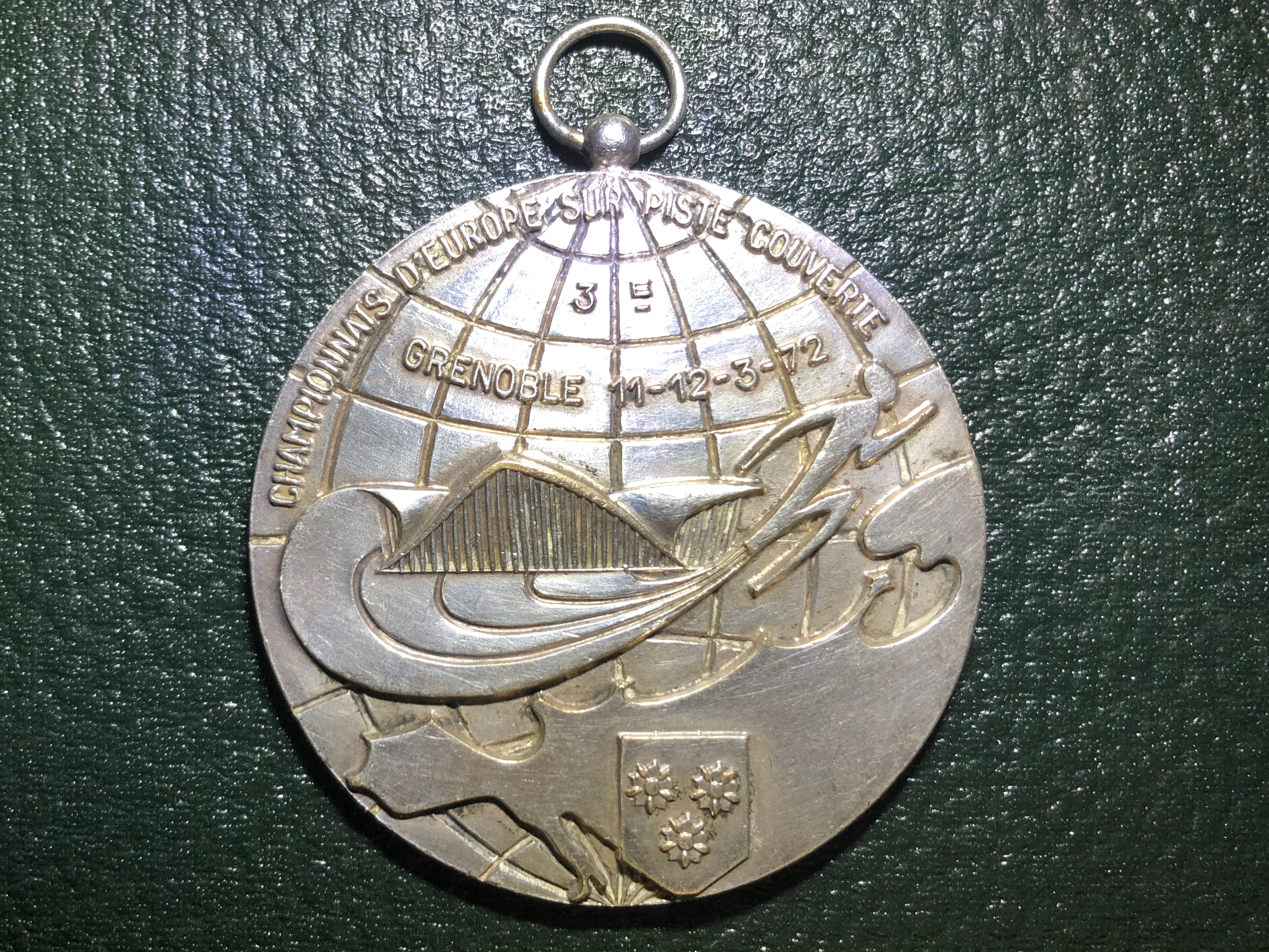
Silver 2nd place medal, March 1972

The figure skating events and some ice hockey games along the closing ceremonies at the 1968 Winter Olympics were held at this arena called for the event Stade de glace.

The arena hosted the 1972 (3rd) European Athletics Indoor Championships over 11 and 12 March, the arena was featured on the medals awarded (pictured).

The arena hosted the 1979 FIBA European Champions Cup final in front of a crowd of 15,000, the 1983 final of the same competition and also the 1985 and 1988 Cup Winners' Cup final.

The arena hosted Bob Marley and the Wailers performance on 3 June 1980 in support of their Uprising Tour.

== Structure ==
The structure consists of two crossing cylinders (95m by 65m). The double shell structure (6 cm thick) is a hyperbolic paraboloid which transfers the weight down its four resting points. In plan, the structure appears to be a square. At each corner is a 48m cantilever.

== See also ==
- List of cycling tracks and velodromes
- List of indoor arenas in France

| Preceded by Festiwalna; Sofia | European Indoor Championships in Athletics; Venue; 1972 | Succeeded by Ahoy; Rotterdam |
| Preceded by Rudi-Sedlmayer-Halle; Munich | FIBA European Champions Cup; Final Venue; 1979 | Succeeded by Deutschlandhalle; Berlin |
| Preceded by Glaspalast; Sindelfingen | European Indoor Championships in Athletics; Venue; 1981 | Succeeded by Palazzo dello Sport; Milan |
| Preceded by Riverfront Coliseum; Cincinnati | Davis Cup; Final Venue; 1982 | Succeeded by Kooyong Stadium; Melbourne |
| Preceded by Sporthalle; Cologne | FIBA European Champions Cup; Final Venue; 1983 | Succeeded by Patinoire des Vernets; Geneva |
| Preceded by Palais des Sports; Ostend | Cup Winners' Cup; Final Venue; 1985 | Succeeded by PalaMaggiò; Castel Morrone |
| Preceded by SPENS; Novi Sad | Cup Winners' Cup; Final Venue; 1988 | Succeeded by Peace and Friendship Stadium; Piraeus |
