= Perret tower (Grenoble) =

Tower in France

- La Tour Perret
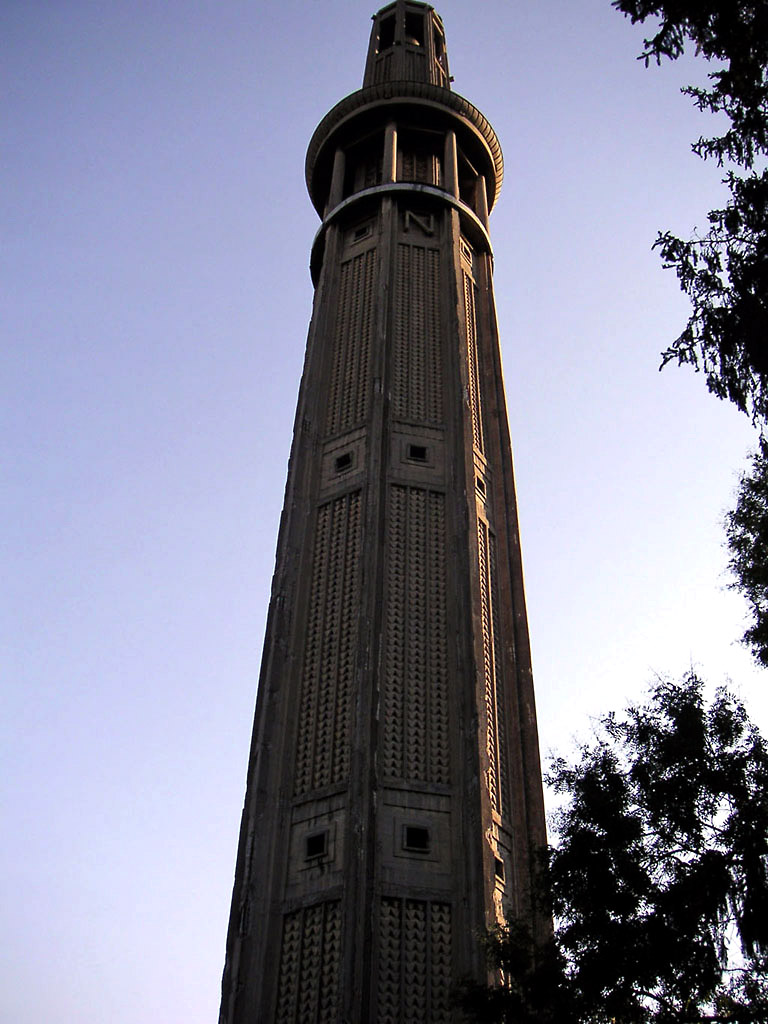
- Interactive map of the Perret tower area

General information
- Status: interior closed to the public since 1960
- Location: Grenoble, Paul Mistral park, France
- Coordinates: 45.18472°N 5.735280°E
- Groundbreaking: 20 May 1924
- Completed: 4 May 1925 (11 months)
- Opening: 6 September 1925, by Prime Minister Paul Painlevé, Edouard Herriot and André Hesse
- Cost: 385,000 FRF (in 1924)
- Owner: Grenoble city

Height
- Antenna spire: 108 metres (354 ft)
- Roof: 95 metres (312 ft)

Technical details
- Floor count: Ground floor and 3 patios
- Lifts/elevators: 2

Design and construction
- Architects: Auguste and Gustave Perret
- Engineer: Auguste Perret

The Perret tower, originally called La tour pour regarder les montagnes ('The tower for looking at the mountains'), is an observation tower in Grenoble, in the Paul Mistral public park. It was the first tower built of reinforced concrete in Europe. In 1998 it was officially declared a national heritage site. It was built for the International Exhibition of Hydropower and Tourism where it was the orientation tower and the symbol of the exhibition. Nowadays it is the last vestige of this exhibition.

== Architecture ==
The Perret tower stands 95 metres (312 ft) tall. It is octagonal in section. Its foundations are 15 metres (49 ft) long, made of 72 vertical stakes of reinforced concrete gathered at the top by a slab and placed on a hard gravel layer. The framework is made of eight vertical poles. The diameter of the tower is 8 metres (26 ft) at the base. The last floor can be reached by a spiral staircase (visible in the top openwork part) or by lift.

Auguste Perret, with the assistance of Marie Dormoy, art critic, came to Grenoble for two years, to give talks and meet political and artistic circles in order to promote a "reinforced-concrete order", a reference to the antique orders.

Made of the first reinforced concrete, the tower is also the first free-standing project designed by the architect Auguste Perret.

The tower is the sum of an architectural and structural thought process that is particularly modern and exact. It is a reinforced concrete structure whose formworks are modular and repetitive, and the prefabricated fillings are reused from the "Notre-Dame du Raincy" church. Despite criticism during its construction it was later deemed a success and cost half as much as the other buildings in the exhibition.

It is also called the orientation tower, not because the four cardinal directions are moulded at the top but because an orientation table sought by the Touring club de France encircles it at the 60 metres (200 ft) level. This orientation table allowed tourists to locate the surrounding mountains to show a unique view of the Alps and Grenoble because its height is about the same as the three towers of the Île Verte in Grenoble.

== History ==
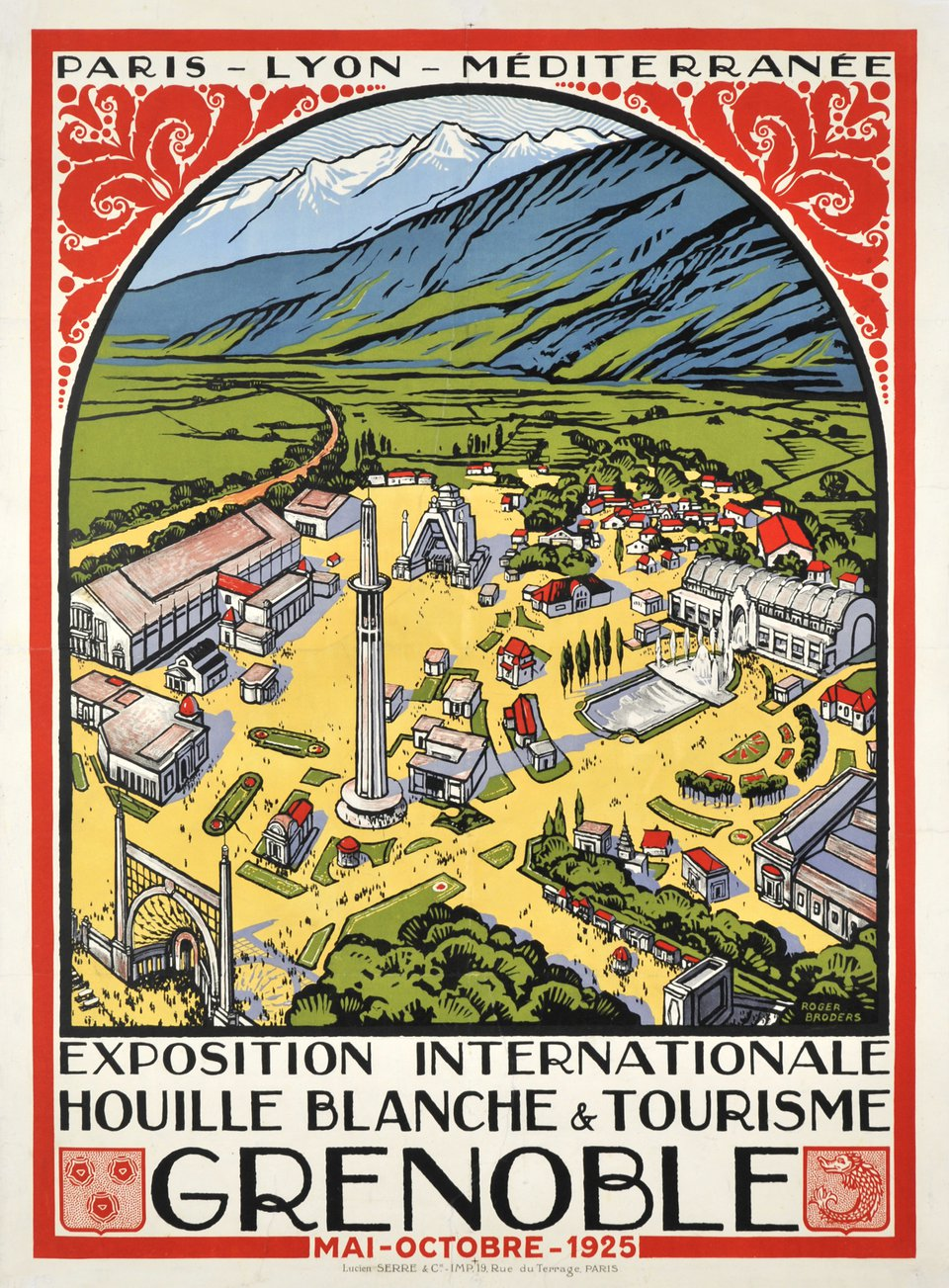
Poster of the PLM railway company for the International Exhibition of Hydropower and Tourism in 1925: at the centre the Perret tower, on the right tourism palace, on the left the railway and tourism industry palace along the Jean Pain boulevard

It was built between 20 May 1924 and 4 May 1925 to the design of the architect Auguste Perret, who had won a competition sponsored by the city for the exhibition, which took place between 21 May and 25 October 1925. The International Exhibition of Hydropower and Tourism focused on the generation and transmission of electricity as well as tourism, which was the No. 2 economic resource in the Alps at the beginning of the century. During the exhibition a floodlight was installed at the top of the tower to light the buildings.

On 6 September 1925 the exhibition was opened by the Prime Minister, Paul Painlevé, Édouard Herriot and André Hesse. On that day more than 2,000 visitors reached the top of the tower by using the two lifts, which took them to the orientation platform located at 60 metres (200 ft) height. At lunch Herriot and Hesse went down last and became stuck in one of the lifts, and the tower staff did not notice, creating some panic among the police.

The International Exhibition of Hydropower and Tourism was a success. More than a million visitors came to the city of 85,000 inhabitants, which benefited in spite of the huge works undertaken.

In 1929 an antenna was installed at the top of the tower to broadcast radio programmes of the channel Alpes-Grenoble.

Nowadays Perret Tower is the only remnant of the exhibition. This tower allowed Perret to prove the enormous qualities of reinforced concrete and make him famous as an architect.

== Today ==
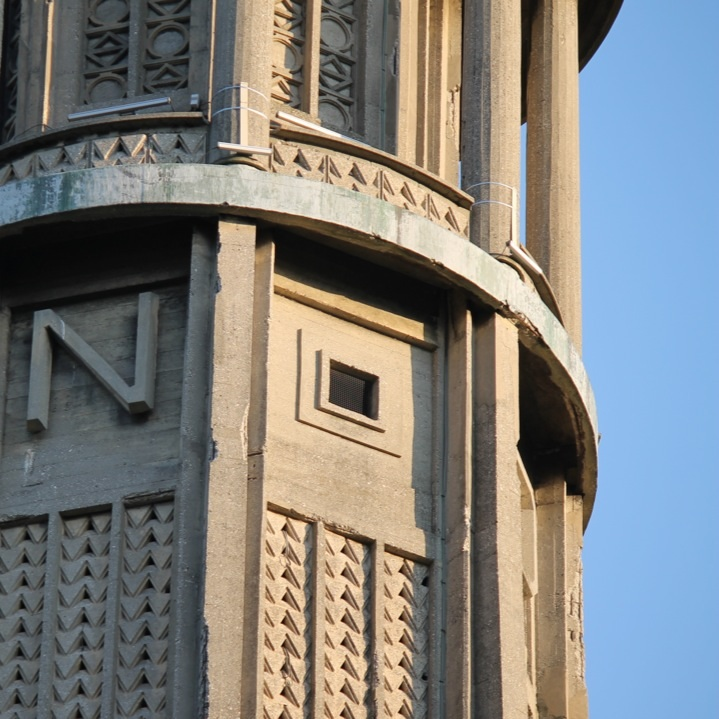
The cardinal points on the top of the tower: visible here the N of North.

In 1960 the tower was closed to the public owing to degradation. In 1998 it was officially declared a national heritage site. Currently the top of the tower is illuminated during the winter and is used as a support for fireworks on 14 July.

No serious maintenance was carried out after the exhibition and the tower degradation might become irreversible: iron frameworks are unsheathed or broken and oxidization of the iron framework causes the reinforced concrete to crumble. In 1951 a façade screed was installed (not efficient for life span). In 2005 a study by Alain Tillier, chief architect of national heritage sites, estimated the restoration cost at 4.5 million euros. No work was done and the tower deteriorated further. In 2012 the Mouton study evaluated the cost at 6 million euros (inside and outside), of which 60% could be supported by a grant from the French government and from the département (Isère) because the tower is a national heritage site. In these studies the restoration includes the reopening to public as well as an upgrade to security standards.

On 12 September 2013 a "Save the Perret tower" petition was introduced. It got more than 500 signatures during the first week and some local newspapers publicized the information.

On 6 February 2014 the organization Ensemble pour la Tour Perret (Together for the Perret tower) was set up to promote protection and restoration of the Perret tower, to publicize its history and its heritage and to ensure and contribute to its promotion.

During the municipal elections in March 2014 some parties promised to support the restoration of the tower: the list "en Grenoble (UMP, UDI, AEI), the list "Imagine Grenoble" (Modem), the list " Aimer Grenoble pour vous" (PS, PCF, Cap21, MRC, PRG, GE, GO Citoyenneté), and the list "Grenoble une ville pour tous" (EELV, PG, Les Alternatifs, GA, ADES, Réseau Citoyen).

On 6 June 2026 it was announced that the tower would reopen to the public on 10 July 2026. The tower was inaugurated on the 10th of July 2026 as announced and was open to the public the next day

== Bibliography ==
- Cédric Avenier, L'ordre du béton. La tour Perret de Grenoble, CRAterre éditions, Labex AE&CC, ENSA Grenoble, mai 2013, 48 p.
- Cédric Avenier, Anne Coste, The Perret Tower : architecture, art and press (relations d’Auguste Perret avec le milieu artistique de son époque : projet de la Tour d’orientation de Grenoble), 4th international Congress on Construction History, Paris, juillet 2012.
- Cédric Avenier, Anne Coste, The Perret Tower : symbol of the 1925 International Hydro-electric Power Exhibition in Grenoble, and of the Cement and Concrete Industry, Engineering History and Heritage, ICE Publishing, London, décembre 2011.
- Cédric Avenier, Ciments de l’Isère, deux siècles d’innovation, DL les patrimoines, 2010, 80 p.

== See also ==
- Tour Perret (Amiens), a skyscraper designed by Perret
