= Stéphane Chaudesaigues =

French tattoo artist

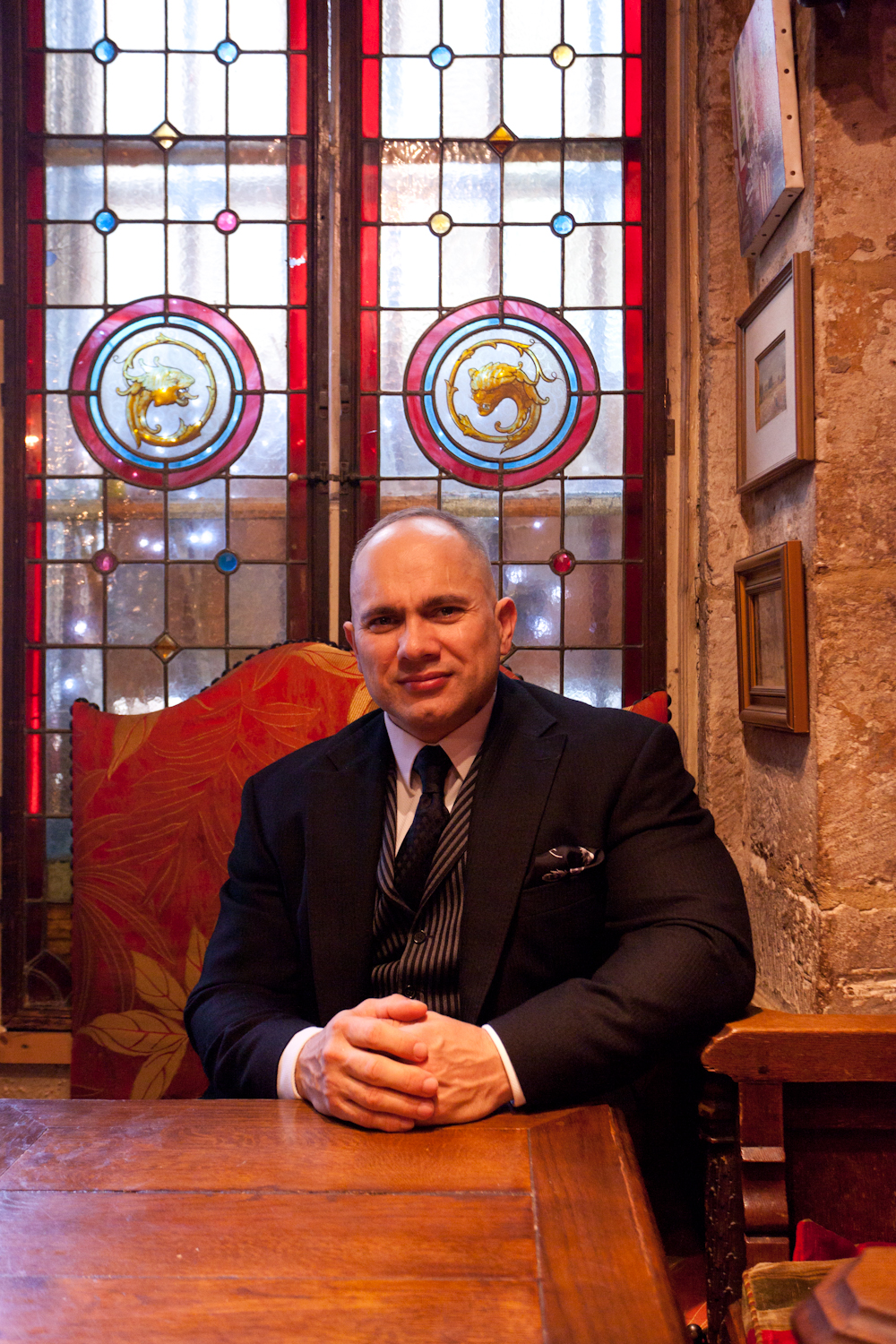
- Stéphane Chaudesaigues
- Born: 1968 (age 57–58); Versailles, France
- Occupation: Tattoo artist

Stéphane Chaudesaigues is a French professional tattoo artist operating out of Versailles, France. His artwork has appeared in many publications, such as "Customizing the body: the art and culture of tattooing", which credits him as a pioneer of the photorealistic tattoo style. In 2012 Chaudesaigues created the Chaudesaigues Award, which recognizes the career and the artistic choices of a tattoo artist.

== Biography ==
Chaudesaigues began tattooing at the age of 15. He was initially unsuccessful in finding a professional apprenticeship and ended up teaching himself from various art technique books. In 1987 Chaudesaigues opened his first art studio in Avignon called "Art Tattoo" with the assistance of his brother Patrick, who was also a tattoo artist. The studio was renamed "Graphicaderme" in 1989 and currently has eight different locations in France. Chaudesaigues also opened a studio in the Paris neighborhood of Marais and in 2011, collaborated with John Lobb Bootmaker to create a pair of shoes that would represent Paris.

In 2011 Chaudesaigues showed his artwork in a New Jersey tattoo convention and began collaborating with tattoo artists such as Shane O’Neill and Nikko Hurtado. Chaudesaigues has also participated in the founding of the World Wide Tattoo Conference, which took place in 2012.

== Awards ==
In 1995 Chaudesaigues was awarded the "Artist of the Year" title from the National Tattoo Association.
