= International Exhibition of Hydropower and Tourism =

1925 exhibition in Grenoble, France

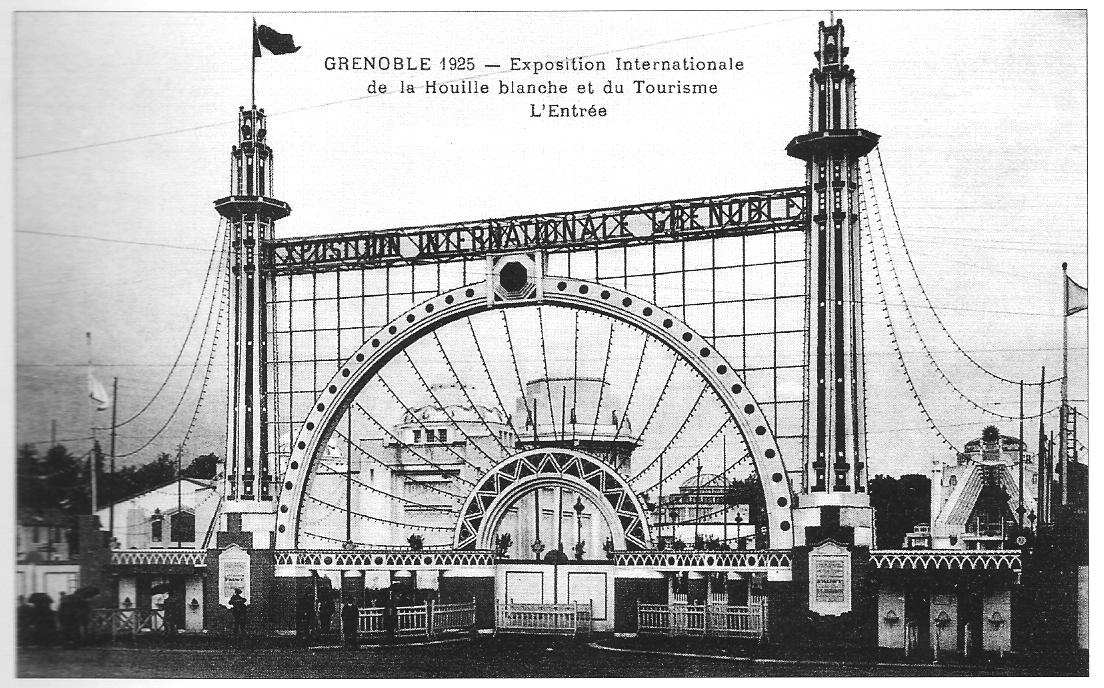
- Gate of the exposition in 1925

Overview
- BIE-class: Unrecognized exposition
- Name: International Exhibition of Hydropower and Tourism
- Visitors: More than 1 million

Location
- Country: France
- City: Grenoble in France
- Coordinates: 45.18472°N 5.735280°E

Timeline
- Opening: 21 May 1925
- Closure: 25 October 1925

The International Exhibition of Hydropower and Tourism (French: Exposition internationale de la houille blanche et du tourisme) was an exhibition which ran from May 21 to October 25, 1925, in the city of Grenoble in France, in order to promote the city as the capital of "white coal" (houille blanche), as hydropower was then known. This exhibition gave credit to the people of Grenoble in general, and the industrialist Aristide Bergès in particular, for harnessing the driving force of water rushing down from the mountains. This was also an opportunity for Grenoble to celebrate the new industries of tomorrow. Suggested by Paul Mistral, the mayor of Grenoble, the project was backed immediately by the support of Léon Perrier, president of the General Council of the Isère. Hydroelectricity is at the center of Grenoble's economic development.

Tourism began to develop in the Alps at the beginning of the twentieth century, with the first bus trips. Hydropower had been developing since the 1870s with the control of waterfalls in the mountains. The paper industry was also growing well, thanks to leaders like Bergès, Felix Viallet and Joseph Bouchayer.

Close to the old town, land was acquired from the military, not without difficulty, and adapted in record time with lot of different buildings, as the Palais de la Houille Blanche.

The event was of utmost importance; the exhibition hosted over one million visitors in five months. "The victory of man over nature, the domination of the forces of the mountains by man", said Mistral, who also inaugurated a new industrial and urban development plan.

The site became a city park in 1926, called Parc Paul Mistral since the death of the mayor in 1932.

Today, the only building remaining of this exhibition in the park, is the Tour Perret, closed to the public since 1960.
