= Nördlingen =

Town in Germany

- Town
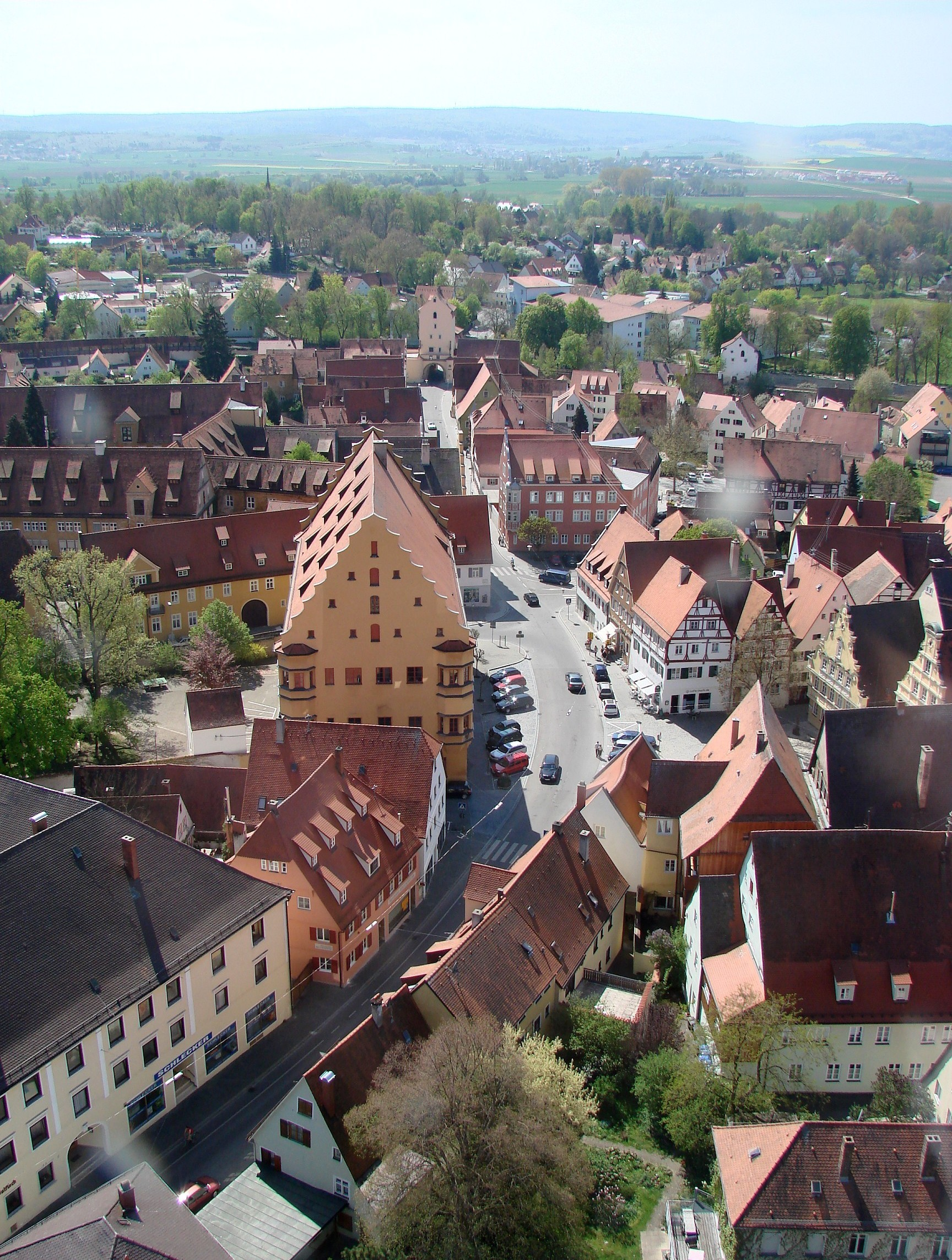
- Nördlingen, south view from the church tower Daniel

- Coat of arms

- Location of Nördlingen within Donau-Ries district
- Interactive map of Nördlingen
- Location within Germany Location within Bavaria
- Coordinates: 48°51′4″N 10°29′18″E
- Country: Germany
- State: Bavaria
- Admin. region: Swabia
- District: Donau-Ries

Government
  - Mayor (2020–26): David Wittner

Area
  - Total: 68.09 km^{2} (26.29 sq mi)
- Elevation: 441 m (1,447 ft)

Population (2025-12-31)
  - Total: 20,442
  - Density: 300.2/km^{2} (777.6/sq mi)
- Time zone: UTC+01:00 (CET)
  - Summer (DST): UTC+02:00 (CEST)
- Postal codes: 86720
- Dialling codes: 09081
- Vehicle registration: DON, NÖ
- Website: www.noerdlingen.de

Nördlingen (German: [ˈnœʁtlɪŋən]; Alemannic German: Nearle or Nerle) is a town in the Donau-Ries district, in Swabia, Bavaria, Germany, with a population of approximately 20,674. It is located approximately 115 km (71 mi) east of Stuttgart, and 145 km (90 mi) northwest of Munich. It was built in an impact crater 15 million years old and 25 km (16 mi) in diameter—the Nördlinger Ries—formed by a meteorite which hit the earth with an estimated speed of 70,000 km/h, and left the area riddled with an estimated 72,000 tons of micro-diamonds.

Nördlingen was first mentioned in recorded history in 898. The town was the location of two battles during the Thirty Years' War, which took place between 1618 and 1648. Today it is one of very few towns in Germany that still have completely intact city walls, joining the ranks of Rothenburg ob der Tauber, Dinkelsbühl and Berching, all of them in Bavaria.

Another attraction in the town is Saint George's Church's 90-metre (300 ft) steeple, called "Daniel", which is made of a suevite impact breccia that contains shocked quartz. Other notable buildings are the town hall (which dates to the 13th century), St. Salvator church and the Spital, a former medieval hospital. The Ries crater museum is located in the well-preserved medieval tanners' quarter.

The city is home to several other museums, such as the Bavarian Railway Museum, the Nördlingen city museum (Stadtmuseum), the city wall museum (Stadtmauermuseum) and Augenblick museum. The latter has panoramas, magic lanterns, silent films, barrel organs, pianolas, music boxes, and gramophones.

== History ==
=== Prehistory and Celtic period ===
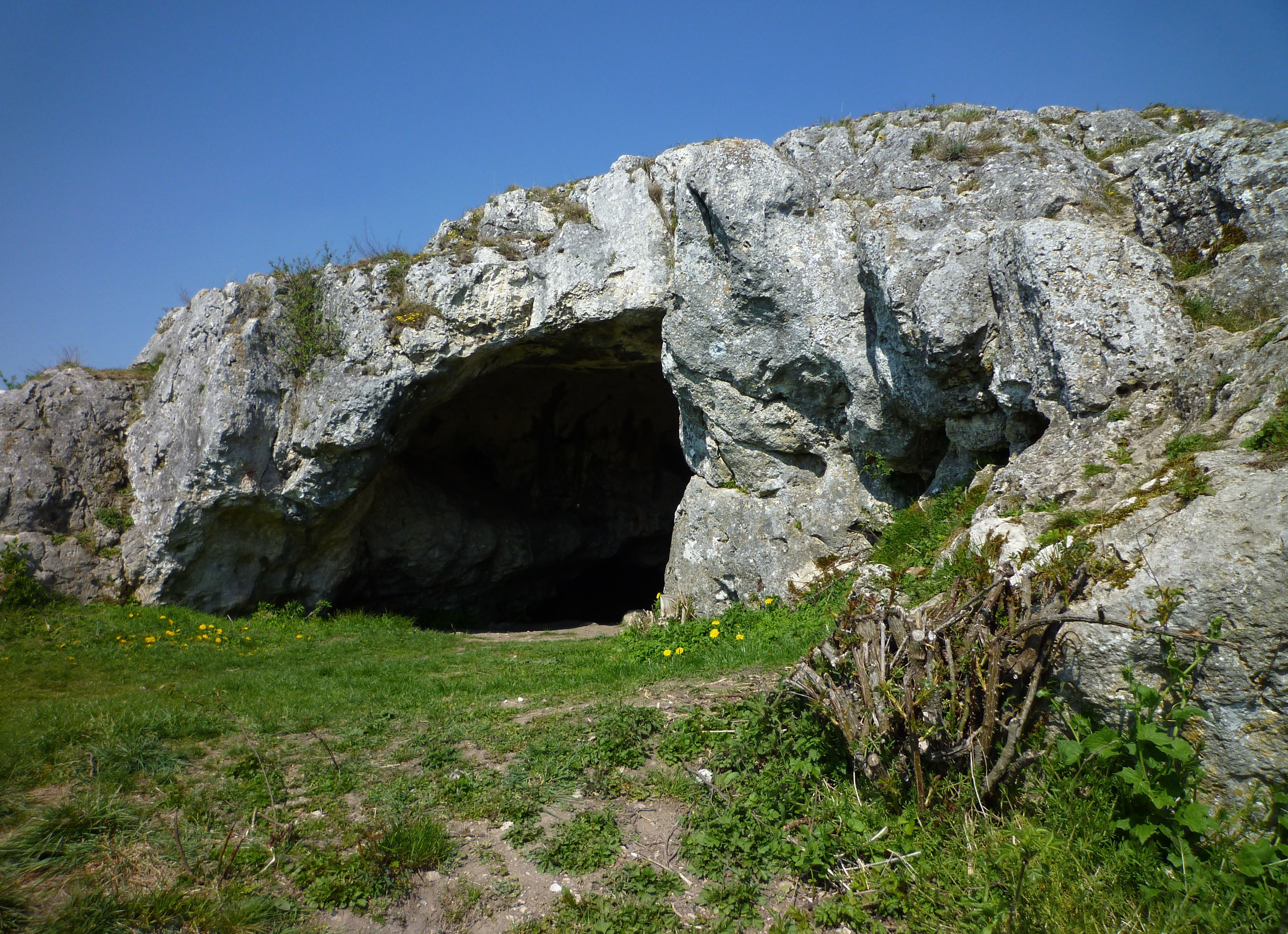
The Large Ofnet, one of the earliest sites with evidence of human habitation in the Nördlingen area

Finds in the Ofnet Caves near the city show that the site of present-day Nördlingen was already inhabited in the late Palaeolithic. In the Large Ofnet, in 1908 archaeologist R. R. Schmidt found two dish-shaped pits in which human skulls were lying "like eggs in flat baskets". In the larger pit were 27 skulls and in the other there were 6 skulls. The skulls were arranged concentrically with their faces turned towards the setting sun. They were all covered with a thick layer of red ochre. The skulls have been dated to the 7th millennium BC. In the area around Nördlingen, additional sites dating to almost all of the subsequent prehistoric epochs have been discovered. Particularly important was an area on the eastern edge of the district Baldingen, where settlements have been found belonging to the Neolithic Linear Pottery culture, the Bronze Age Urnfield culture, and the Celtic Iron Age Hallstatt and La Tène cultures.

=== Roman Empire ===
The area which includes present-day Nördlingen was part of the Roman province of Raetia, but little research has been conducted on the city's Roman period. A Roman villa has been excavated in the district of Holheim, and can be visited today. Another villa with an adjoining burial ground has been identified in the Baldingen district. A settlement (vicus), built in 85 C.E., occupied the southern part of the city until 259–260 C.E., when it was destroyed during the conquest of what is now southern Germany by the Germanic-speaking Alemanni tribes. The Roman settlement may have been the one known as Septemiacum, which is supposed to have been built between 80–300 C.E., although it is possible that this particular settlement was actually located at a different site such as Oberdorf, leaving the name of the settlement at Nördlingen uncertain.

=== Middle Ages ===
The Alemannic people occupied the Nördlingen area during the 6th and 7th centuries, during which time the region was gradually Christianised under the Merovingian dynasty, and several burial grounds from this period have been discovered. The name "Nordilinga" is first found in documents of the Carolingian royal court dating from 898, and the city today celebrates this as the date of its "foundation". Under the rule of the Bishops of Regensburg, Nördlingen grew into an important market town.

In 1215, Nördlingen was granted city rights by Emperor Frederick II and became imperial city of the Holy Roman Empire. In that year, the first city wall was built, the footprint of which is still visible today. In a document dating to 1219, the Nördlinger Pfingstmesse ("Nördlingen Pentecost fair") was first mentioned, an event which continues as a folk festival in the city to the present day. Thanks to Nördlingen's location at the crossroads of two major trade routes (Frankfurt / Würzburg-Augsburg and Nuremberg-Ulm), it became an important trading centre for grain, livestock, textiles, furs, and metal goods. Besides Frankfurt am Main, Nördlingen was one of the most important long-distance trade fairs in the region.

In 1238, a fire destroyed much of Nördlingen, but the city quickly recovered. Three generations later, a large number of craftsmen, especially tanners and weavers, settled outside the city walls. In 1327 the present-day circular wall was built, which increased the size of the walled portion of the city fourfold. 1427 saw the start of construction on St. George's Church.

In the year 1472 the court case against the brothel owners Linhardt Freiermuth and his wife Barbara Taschenfeind is recorded in the city's court records. The starting point of the trial was the charge of forced abortion on the prostitute Els von Eystett. The court convicted the owners and banished the husband from the city. His wife was branded on the forehead and pilloried. The associated 40 parchment pages in the Nördlingen city archives give unique insight into the conditions of a brothel in this time period.

=== Early modern period ===
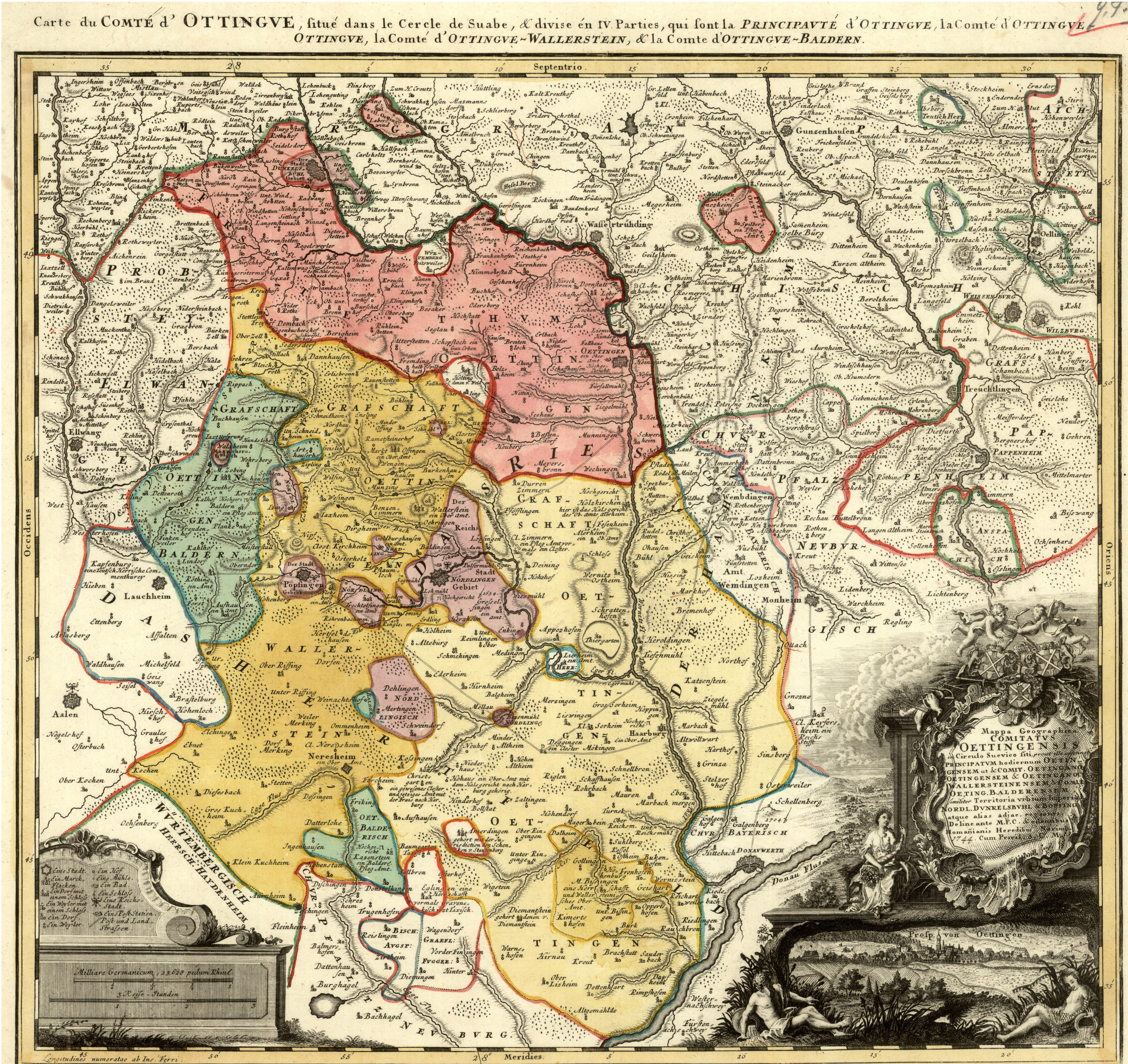
1744 map of the County of Oettingen, with Nördlingen and its exclaves in the middle, coloured violet

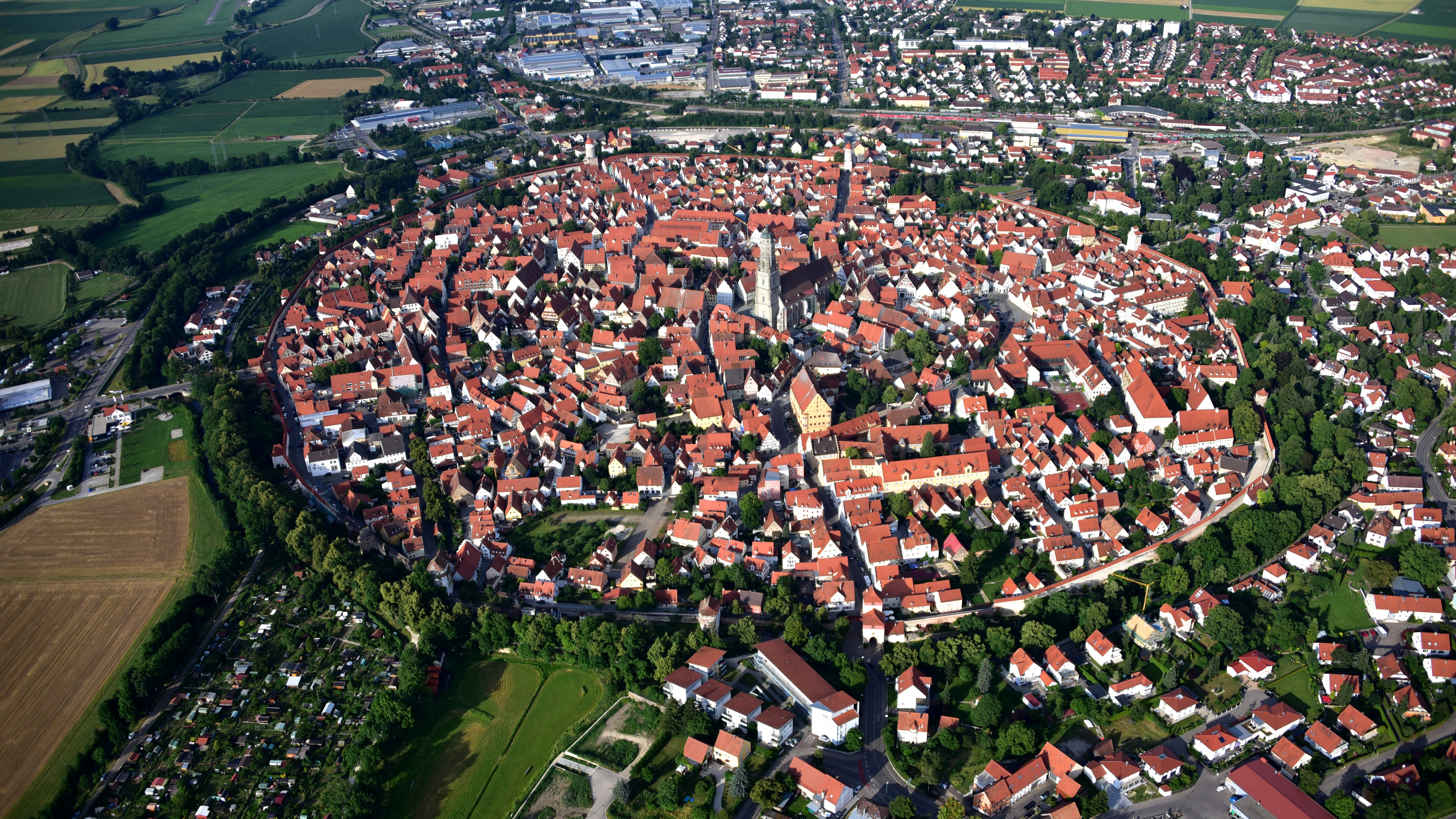
The fortress walls of Nördlingen are well preserved.

In 1529, the city was part of the Protestation at Speyer, which sought to allow the unimpeded spread of the Protestant Reformation. In 1555, the Reformation in Nördlingen was finally completed. In 1579, Mayor Peter Seng (1512–1589) signed the Lutheran Formula of Concord.

The witch trials in the early modern period in Nördlingen have been well documented. Between 1589 and 1598, 34 women and one man were burned at the stake for the crime of witchcraft, and one co-defendant midwife, Barbara Lierheimer, died while in custody. The trials of Maria Holl and Rebecca Lemp became especially well-known. In 1589, Pastor Wilhelm Friedrich Lutz delivered sermons against the radical witch persecution of Nördlingen City Council, prior to the Council's execution of the first alleged witches in May 1590. One of the three women executed in that year was a carter's daughter, Ursula Haider, who was arrested on 8 November 1589 and burned on 15 May 1590. The trial of Ursula Haider was by described by Ulrike Haß in her book Teufelstanz.

It is often said that in 1604 a shortened and simplified version of William Shakespeare's Romeo and Juliet was performed in Nördlingen and that this was one of the first performances of any Shakespearean play outside England. In fact, the players applied to perform but were denied by the local authorities and were compensated for their efforts.

Nördlingen served as the site of two historic battles, and marked a turning point in the Thirty Years' War. In the first Battle of Nördlingen in 1634, the Swedish Protestant forces were decisively defeated for the first time by the imperial Habsburg troops. The city was compelled to open its gates to the victors, but was not plundered by the victorious troops after high reparations payments. However, during and after the siege, the city lost more than half of its population due to hunger and illness. This was exacerbated by the second Battle of Nördlingen in 1645, and it would not be until 1939 that Nördlingen regained the population it had in 1618. In the early 18th century, during the War of the Spanish Succession, the city was further affected by the impact of nearby battles of Höchstädt. The wars forced trade to shift to the seaports, and as a result, Nördlingen lost its importance as a trading centre. In part due to this forced economic standstill, Nördlingen's medieval cityscape remained well preserved.

As a result of the German mediatization, in 1803 Nördlingen lost its status as an imperial city and became part of the Electorate of Bavaria, which had occupied the city in September 1802 in anticipation of the decree. On 1 January 1806, Bavaria's Elector declared himself king, officially changing the Electorate of Bavaria into the Kingdom of Bavaria, which seceded from the Holy Roman Empire the following August.

=== Modern period ===
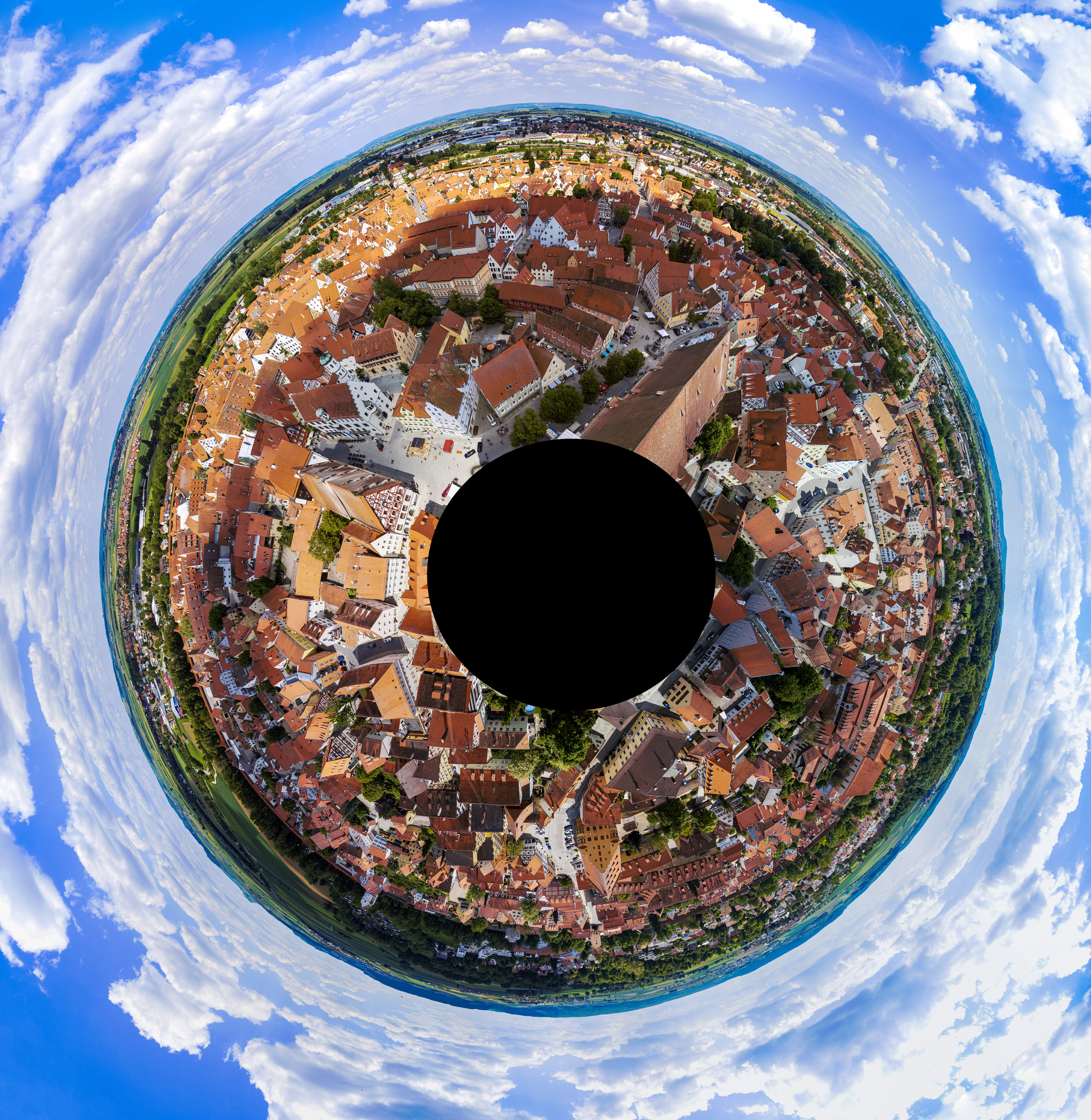
"Little planet" panorama of Nördlingen

On 15 May 1849, Nördlingen was connected to the network of the Royal Bavarian State Railways. In that same year, the first rail lines opened to Nuremberg. A third railway connection, under the leadership of the Royal Württemberg State Railways, was opened on 3 October 1863 to Aalen.

During the Second World War, a total of 33 people were killed in and around Nördlingen by air raids conducted in the spring of 1945. The train station and several houses were destroyed, and St. George's Church was severely damaged. However, most of the historic district of the city was spared. In 1945, Nördlingen became part of the American occupation zone of Allied-occupied Germany. The United States military set up a displaced persons camp in the city. It was overseen by UNRRA and housed approximately 500 DPs, mostly from Latvia and Lithuania. More than 4,500 people settled permanently in Nördlingen after the war.

Since the Middle Ages, Jewish families have resided in Nördlingen. They buried their dead in the Jewish cemetery on Nähermemminger Way, and a synagogue was built in 1885. The synagogue was destroyed by the Nazis during the November pogrom of 1938, and this is commemorated by a plaque on today's Protestant parish hall. In 1979, a memorial stone was erected in the Jewish cemetery commemorating Jewish victims of the Holocaust.

In the course of the municipal reorganisation of Bavaria, Nördlingen lost its status as a city on 1 July 1972, and was incorporated into the newly formed district Nördlingen-Donauwörth, which received its current name, Donau-Ries, on 1 May 1973.

Nördlingen is one of a small number of cities to still have a Night Watchman, a position which dates back to 1440.

== Mayors ==
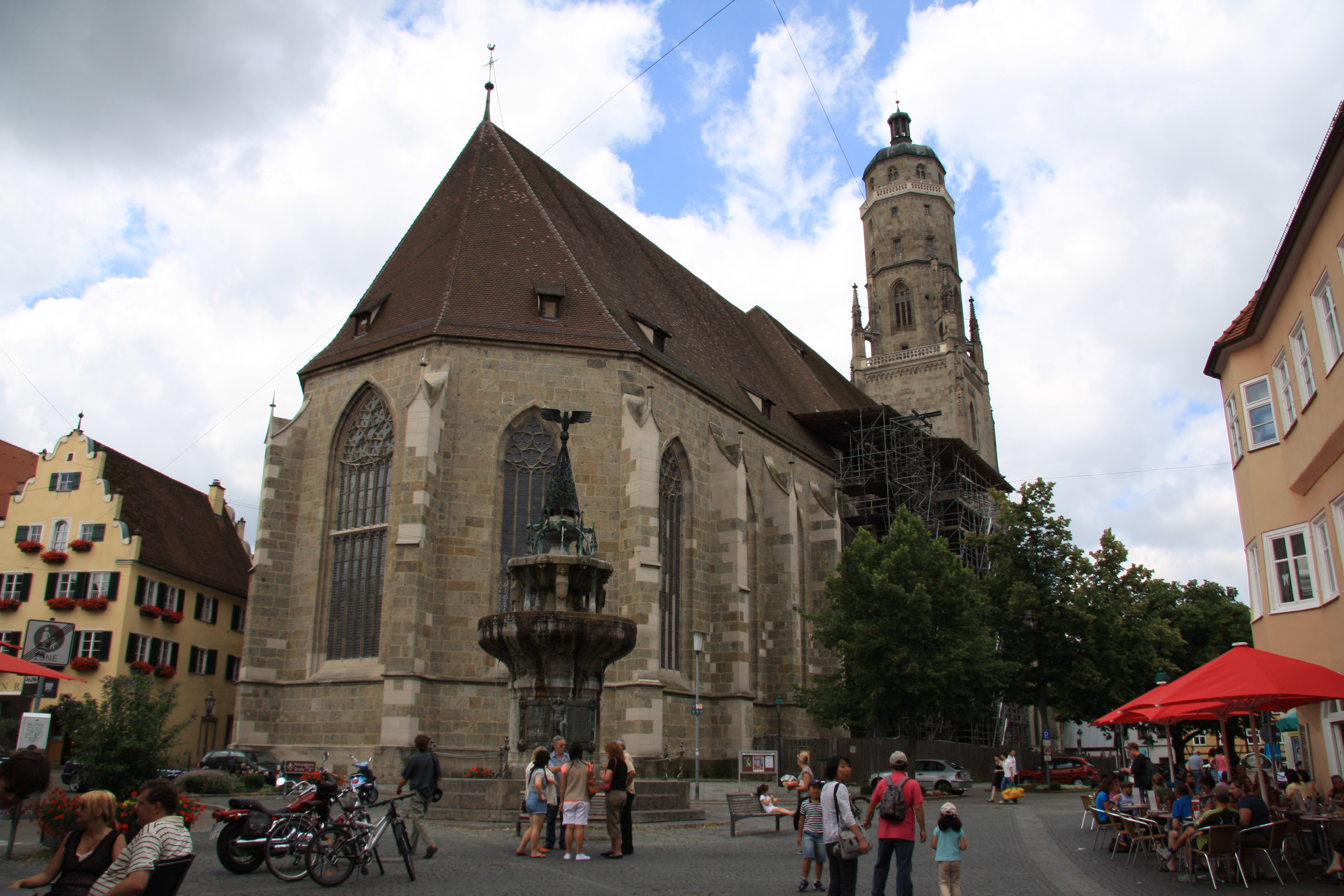
Saint George's church, Nördlingen, the Daniel in background

List of Nördlingen mayors since 1914
Name	Term of office
Wilhelm Brunco	1914–1916
Otto Mainer	1916–1927
Wilhelm Hausmann	1927–1939
Heinrich Schulz	1939–1941
Eugen Einberger	1941–1944
Paul Söldner	1945–1946
Josef Feil	1946–1948
Johannes Weinberger	1948–1964
Hermann Keßler	1964–1982
Paul Kling	1982–2006
Hermann Faul	2006–2020
David Wittner	2020–

== Economy ==
Important companies in Nördlingen are:

- C.H. Beck – book publisher
- DS Smith – packaging manufacturer
- Maierbier – brewery
- Varta – battery manufacturer

Nördlingen has a station on the Augsburg–Nördlingen railway and the Stuttgart-Bad Cannstatt–Nördlingen railway, which are served hourly on weekdays.

== Sport ==
The local sports club, the TSV 1861 Nördlingen, has a basketball department with the men's and the women's team both in the Basketball Bundesliga.

The town’s stadium was renamed in 2008 after its most successful football player, Gerd Müller, who was born and raised in Nördlingen.

Nördlingen is also known for the Scharlachrennen (Scarlet Race), a horse race tournament that was first mentioned in 1463. Since World War II, it has expanded to include eventing, jumping and dressage.

== Impact diamonds ==
Stone buildings in the town contain millions of tiny diamonds, all less than 0.2 mm (0.008 in) across. The meteorite impact—from a 1 km-wide (0.6 mi) asteroid—that caused the Nördlinger Ries crater created an estimated 72,000 tons of these tiny diamonds when it impacted a local graphite deposit. Stone from this area was later quarried and used to build the stone buildings.

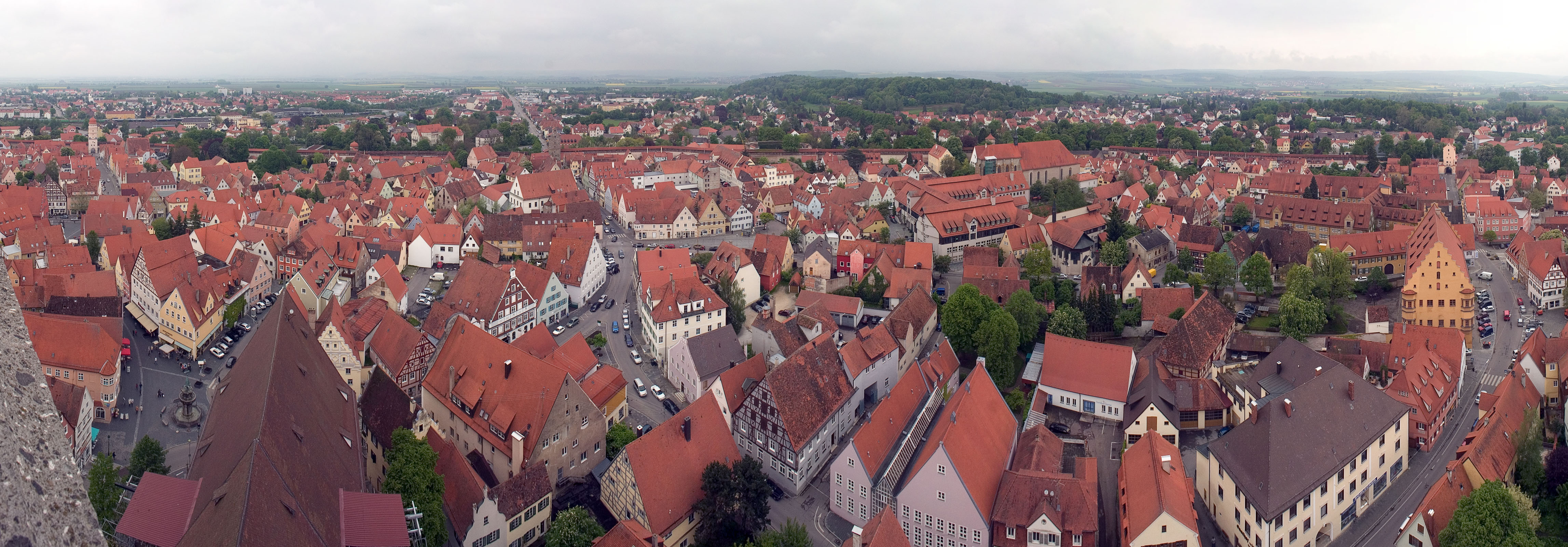
July 2005 panorama of Nördlingen from the Daniel

== In popular culture ==
Aerial scenes at the end of the 1971 film Willy Wonka & the Chocolate Factory were filmed in Nördlingen.

The setting of the anime Princess Tutu is based on Nördlingen.

Nördlingen bears a resemblance to the town of Shiganshina from Attack on Titan, though there is no official link between the two. After being featured on a Japanese variety show in 2013, Nördlingen became a tourist destination for fans of the series.

== Twin towns – sister cities ==
Nördlingen is twinned with:

- Markham, Canada
- Wagga Wagga, Australia
- Riom, France
- Olomouc, Czech Republic

== Notable people ==
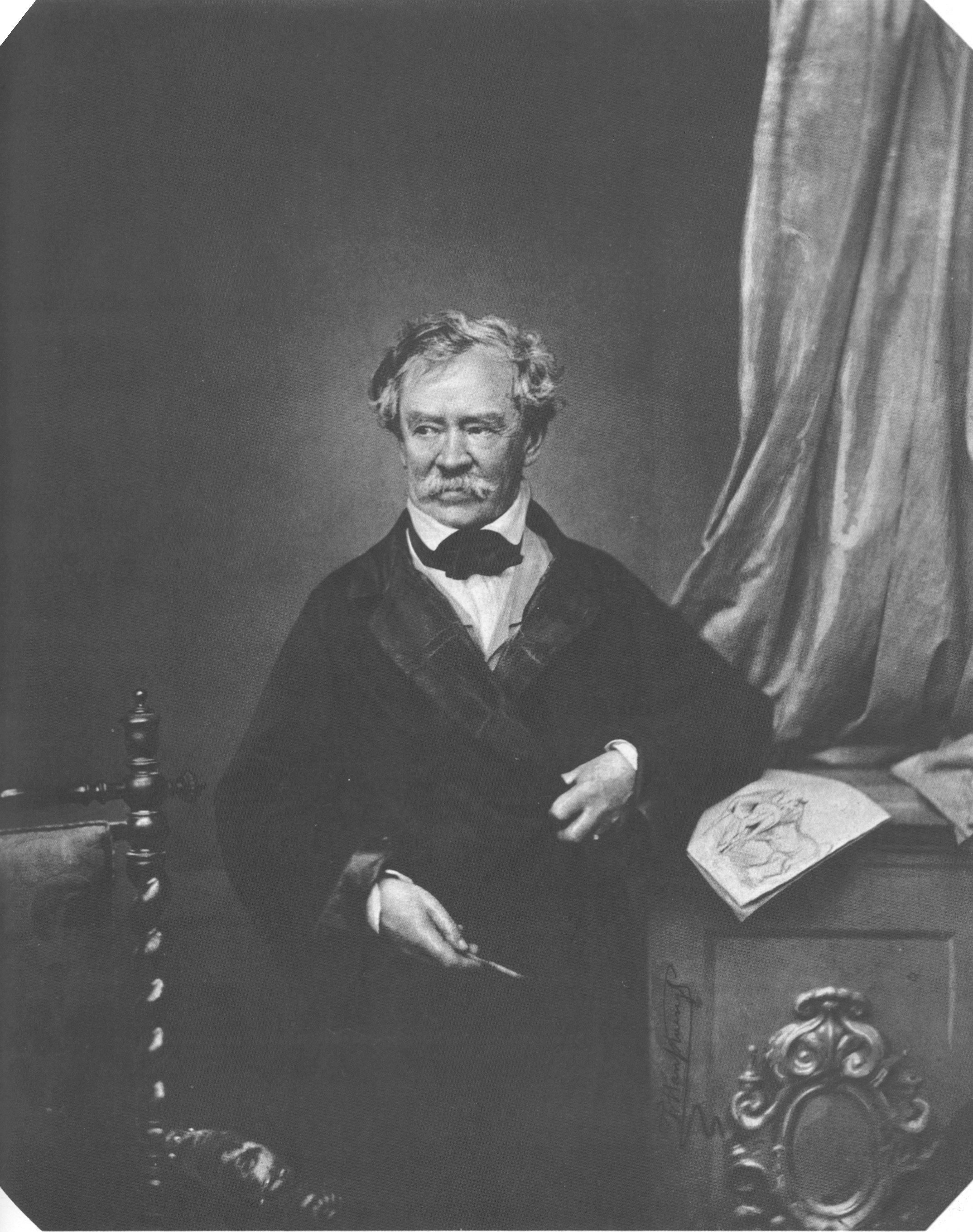
Albrecht Adam, c. 1850

- Friedrich Herlin (1425/1430–1500), painter
- Bartholomäus Zeitblom (c. 1455 – c. 1518), painter
- Karl Heinrich Ritter von Lang (1764 at Balgheim – 1835), historian and statesman
- Albrecht Adam (1786–1862), war artist
- Heinrich Adam (1787–1862), painter, member of the painter family Adam from Nördlingen
- Johann Michael Voltz (1784–1858), graphic artist and painter
- Friedrich Voltz (1817–1886), painter
- Robert Beyschlag (1838–1903), painter
- Otto Förschner (1902–1946), SS commander and a Nazi concentration camp official executed for war crimes
- Christel DeHaan (1942–2020), American businesswoman and philanthropist, former owner of Resort Condominiums International, founder of Christel House International
- Gerd Müller (1945–2021), football player and coach
- Anton Meyer (born 1955), economist and professor of business administration
- Sabine Haubitz (born 1959), art photographer
- Michael Lutz (born 1982), footballer
- Frank Kechele (born 1986), racing driver
- Stefan Rieß (born 1988), footballer
- Steffen Lang (born 1993), footballer

== See also ==
- Rintfleisch-Pogrom
- Master of Nördlingen, whose name is derived from the town
- Henry of Nördlingen
- Herkheim, a community within Nördlingen
