= Beyschlag =

Beyschlag is a surname. Notable people with the surname include:

- Robert Beyschlag, German painter
- Willibald Beyschlag, German Protestant theologian
