= Karl Lang =

Karl Lang may refer to:

- Karl Heinrich Lang (1764–1835), German historian
- Karl Georg Herman Lang (1901–1976), Swedish zoologist
