= Lederfabrik Heilbronn =

German-based company

Gebr. Victor, Lederfabrik
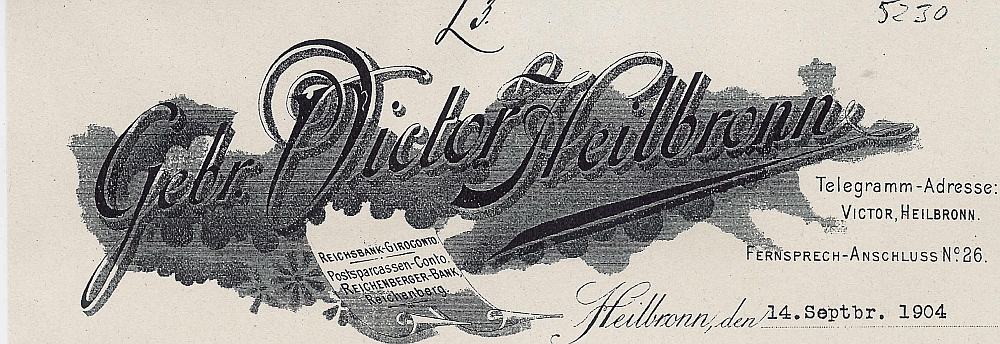

Lederfabrik Heilbronn was a company in the city of Heilbronn in Baden-Württemberg, Germany, which became a leading leather goods manufacturer.

== Beginnings ==
The company was founded by the Victor family from Herkheim, who ran a trade in furs and skins there. Julius Victor (* June 15, 1838; † August 30, 1887 in Heilbronn) acquired the citizenship of the city of Heilbronn on July 3, 1862; at that time he could prove a fortune of 3000 gulden. In 1868, Julius, Joseph and Victor Victor went into business for themselves as Gebr. Victor in Heilbronn at Große Biedermannsgasse 10, in order to continue trading there on a larger scale, now for smoked goods, game and saddlery leather goods.

In 1882, the company moved to Cäcilienstraße 42 a. In 1887, a glue factory was added. By 1899, the company was advertising the import of overseas hides, and was owned by the sons of the founders Victor, Jakob Victor I and Jacob Victor II, as well as the widow of Joseph Victor, and from 1908 also Sigmund Victor.

== Expansion ==
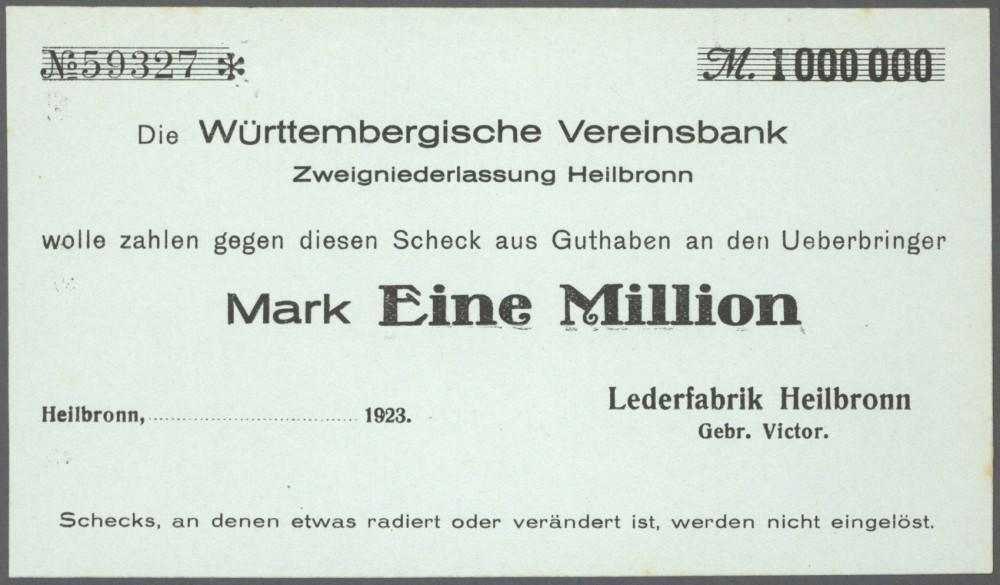
Firmenscheck über eine Million Inflations-Mark (1923)

The company continued to expand, but it was not until 1909/1910 that the descendants Jacob Viktor II and Sigmund Victor, together with their cousin Jakob Victor I, built a leather factory at Weipertstraße 40 in Heilbronn's already industrial area of Kleinäulein. The company was now called Lederfabrik Heilbronn GmbH. Floor leather for shoes was produced from overseas cattle hides. Before World War I, the factory was one of the leading leather factories in Germany, and one of the largest in southern Germany. Production was not only for the German market, but increasingly also for export. Up to 280 employees worked in the partly newly created workshops.

== Social role ==
Members of the Victor family belonged to the board of the Centralverein der Deutschen Lederindustrie (Berlin) and the advisory board of the Heilbronn Chamber of Industry and Commerce. Eugen Julius Victor (* December 16, 1898 in Heilbronn) was chairman of the Reichsbund of Jewish front-line soldiers in Heilbronn. Sigmund Victor died on May 16, 1930. The Victor brothers established various local foundations: in 1915, one endowed with 150,000 marks for workers in need. The city was granted a foundation with the assets of 20,000 marks, intended for the support of poor citizens. "The Victors were among the most respected citizens and factory owners in the city.“.

Victoria Wolff, née Trude Victoria Victor (* December 10, 1903 in Heilbronn; † September 16, 1992 in Los Angeles), the daughter of Jacob Victor, became a well-known U.S. writer and screenwriter after her emigration. She grew up with her parents in Heilbronn, where it is said that the young Albert Einstein once tried to give her lessons in mathematics.

== Nazi-era ==
As soon as the Nazis came to power in 1933, disruptions and harassment of the company began. A Werkschar group had to be set up. Quote: "Werkscharen were formed in the factories under the Nazi regime as a "vanguard group for the dissemination of the National Socialist worldview". Their members were recruited from the company "followers". The "Werkschar" had to be able "without external means of power, precisely in the hour of danger, to instantly eliminate and eradicate any disturbance, disorder, or even irresponsible agitation that might arise". After Jacob Victor's death on June 12, 1934, only a few members of the workforce dared to attend the funeral; "an intrepid machine foreman sounded the factory siren as a final salute".

In the meantime, Max Victor (* May 3, 1905 in Heilbronn), the second son of Jacob Victor II, had joined the company after being forced to give up his position as a research assistant at the Kiel Institute for the World Economics and Maritime Transport. Robert Victor, the second son of Sigmund Victor, who also worked at the factory, emigrated to South Africa at an early age.

Hans Franke writes about the factory as a place of refuge for Jewish people:

Die Fabrik wurde in den folgenden Jahren für viele jüdische Menschen eine Zuflucht: verschiedene weibliche jüdische Angestellte, die von anderen Firmen entlassen waren, wurden aufgenommen, ebenso jüdische Jungen, die in den Schulen keine ruhige Minute mehr hatten. Ferner planierte man einen Platz hinter der Fabrik zu einem Fußballplatz um, da die Heilbronner Juden keine Möglichkeit mehr hatten, den Sport anderswo auszuüben. Obwohl man später einen nichtjüdischen Betriebsführer einsetzte, wurde die Lage immer gespannter.

Eugen Victor moved to Holland in view of the increasing threat; the factory was continued by Max Victor and Otto Victor (* February 7, 1904 in Heilbronn). The company was Aryanized; the Jewish owners removed, the factory was forcibly sold to the largest German leather factory Hirschberg vorm. Heinrich Knoch & Co. Max Victor wanderte nach Holland und Otto Victor nach Südafrika aus.

The operation was discontinued in 1939. The Silberwarenfabrik Bruckmann now produced war material in the premises with 250 foreign workers, among others for Daimler-Benz, temporarily another company was active here with armament tasks. Some of the old staff had been drafted into the Wehrmacht, while others worked on armaments tasks in the silverware factory.

Due to the effects of war, the factory was heavily destroyed on December 4, 1944. After renewed air raids, 85 percent of the facilities were demolished.

== Restitution and closure ==
After the end of the war, the former owners regained the majority shareholding in the company through the restitution laws. The company was continued jointly by Messrs. Viktor, who retained their residence in North America and South Africa, and Lederfabrik Heinrich Knoch A.-G. on the basis of an agreement.

Crisis in the leather industry led to the closure of the plant in 1954. In 1954, the buildings and land were sold to the city of Heilbronn, and the buildings were demolished between 1977 and 1980.

== Literature ==
- Christhard Schrenk: Heilbronnica 4. Beiträge zur Stadtgeschichte. Stadtarchiv Heilbronn, Heilbronn 2008, ISBN 978-3-94064-6-019.
