= Rieskrater Museum =

Ries Crater Museum
- Rieskrater Museum
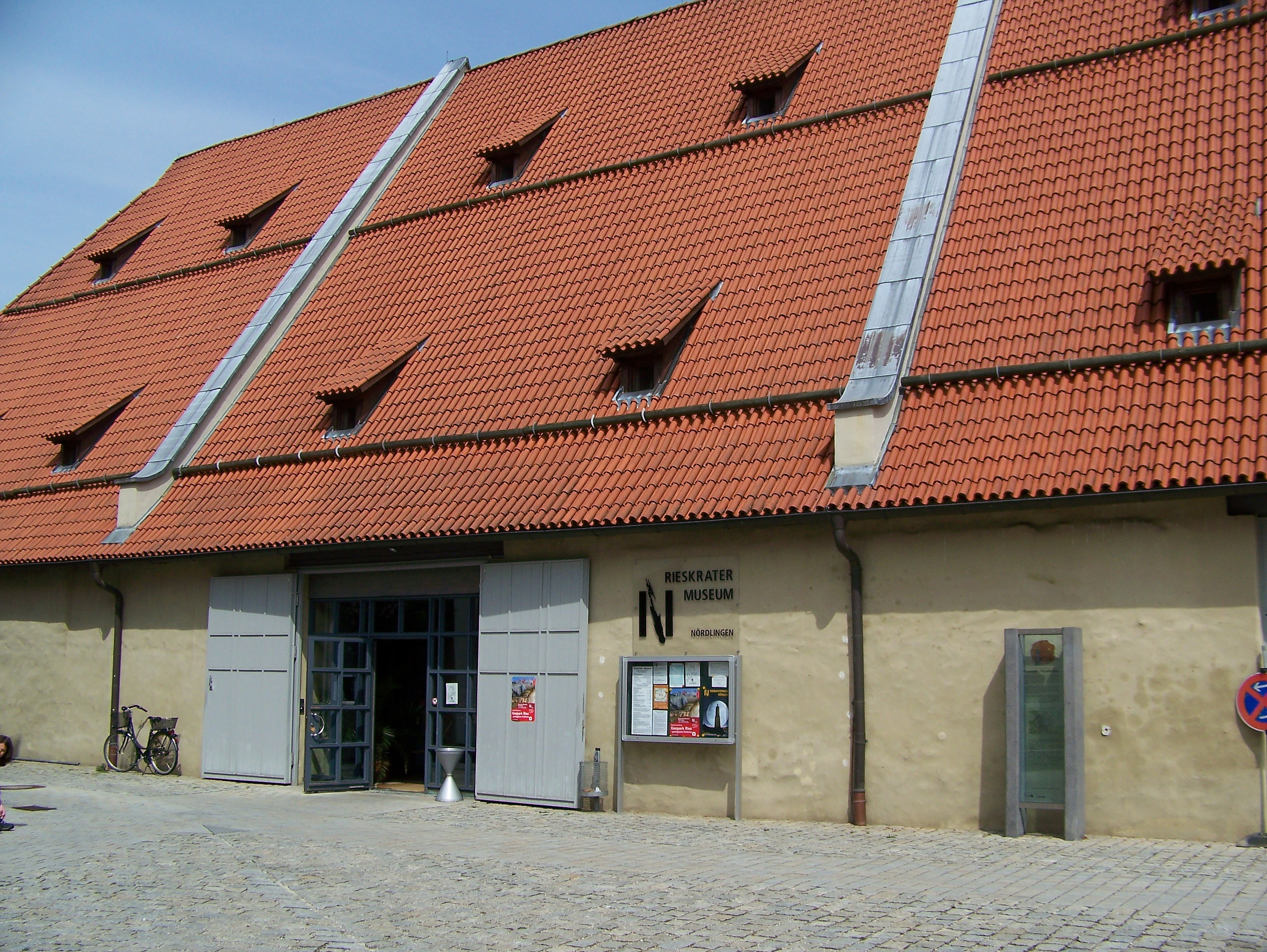

- Location within Bavaria Location within Germany
- Established: 1990-05-06
- Location: Eugene Shoemaker-Platz 1, 86720 Nördlingen, Germany
- Coordinates: 48°51′14″N 10°29′13″E
- Type: Geological museum
- Director: Prof. Dr. Stefan Hölzl
- Website: rieskrater-museum.de

The Rieskrater Museum, sometimes known in English as the Ries Crater Museum, focuses on meteors and their collisions with Earth. The museum is housed in a 16th-century barn in Nördlingen, Germany which was part of the medieval city's center.

The area (Nördlinger Ries) is the location of a meteor's impact with Earth c. 15 million years ago. This might have been a double impact, as the Steinheim crater is nearby and has the same estimated age. The Ries Crater has been recognized as an impact crater since the early 1960s.

The museum's collection includes a genuine Moon rock from the 1972 Apollo 16 mission, on loan from NASA in return for using the Nördlingen crater for training the Apollo 14 astronauts due to its similarities to a Moon crater.

The museum is affiliated with the nearby Geopark Ries (UNESCO - International Network of Geoparks), whose mission is to protect the crater.

The museum opened in May 1990 and received its millionth visitor on 15 December 2012.

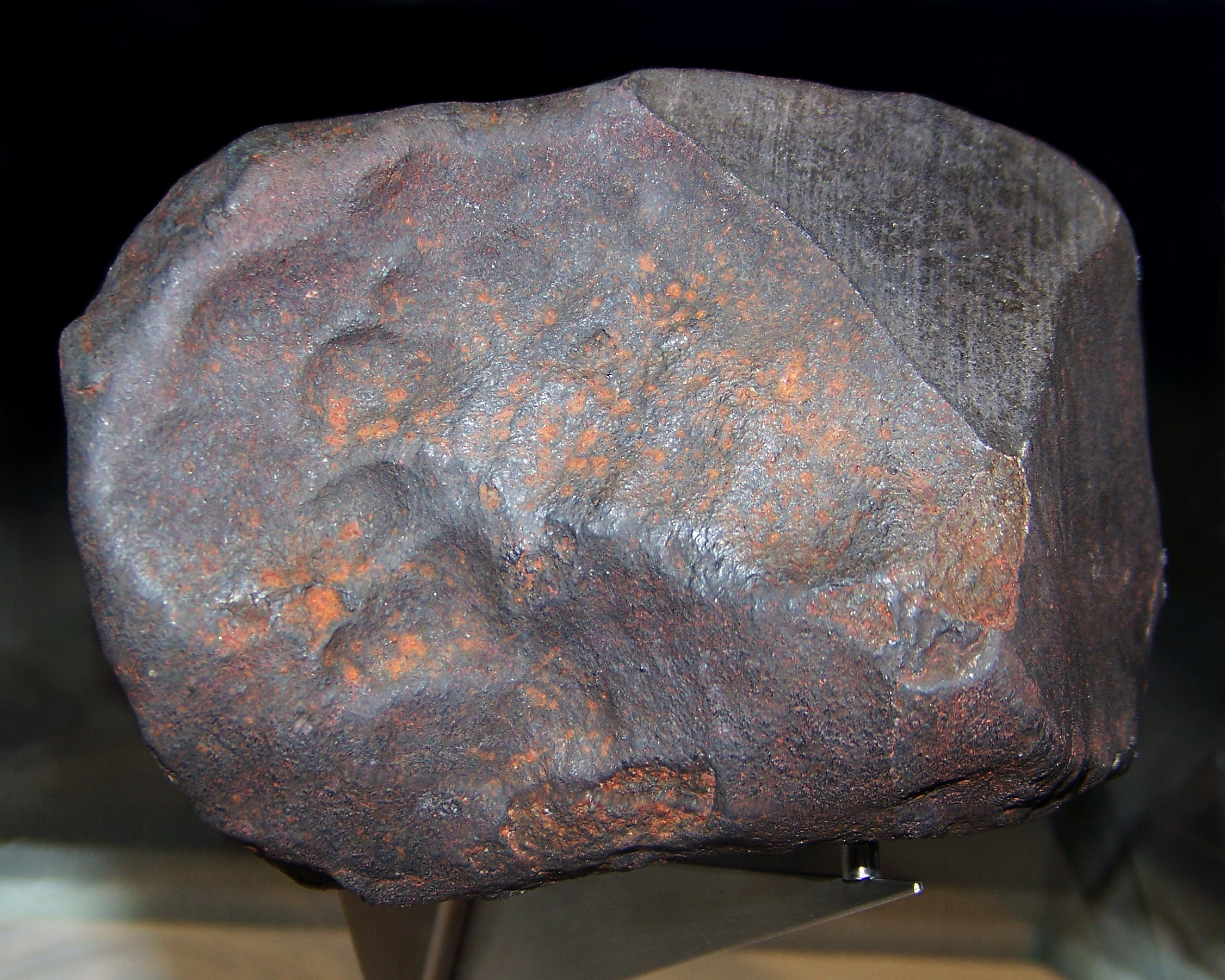
Meteoritenfragment Neuschwanstein I - 1705 Gram

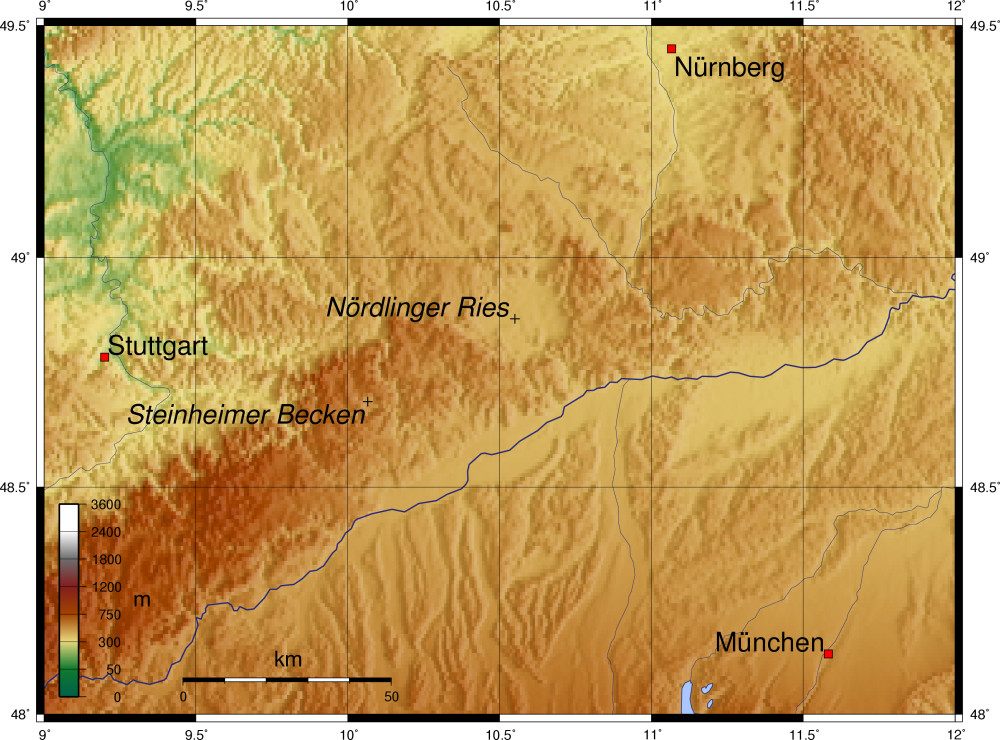
Nördlinger Ries, Steinheim crater, Danube, Stuttgart, Nuremberg and Munich

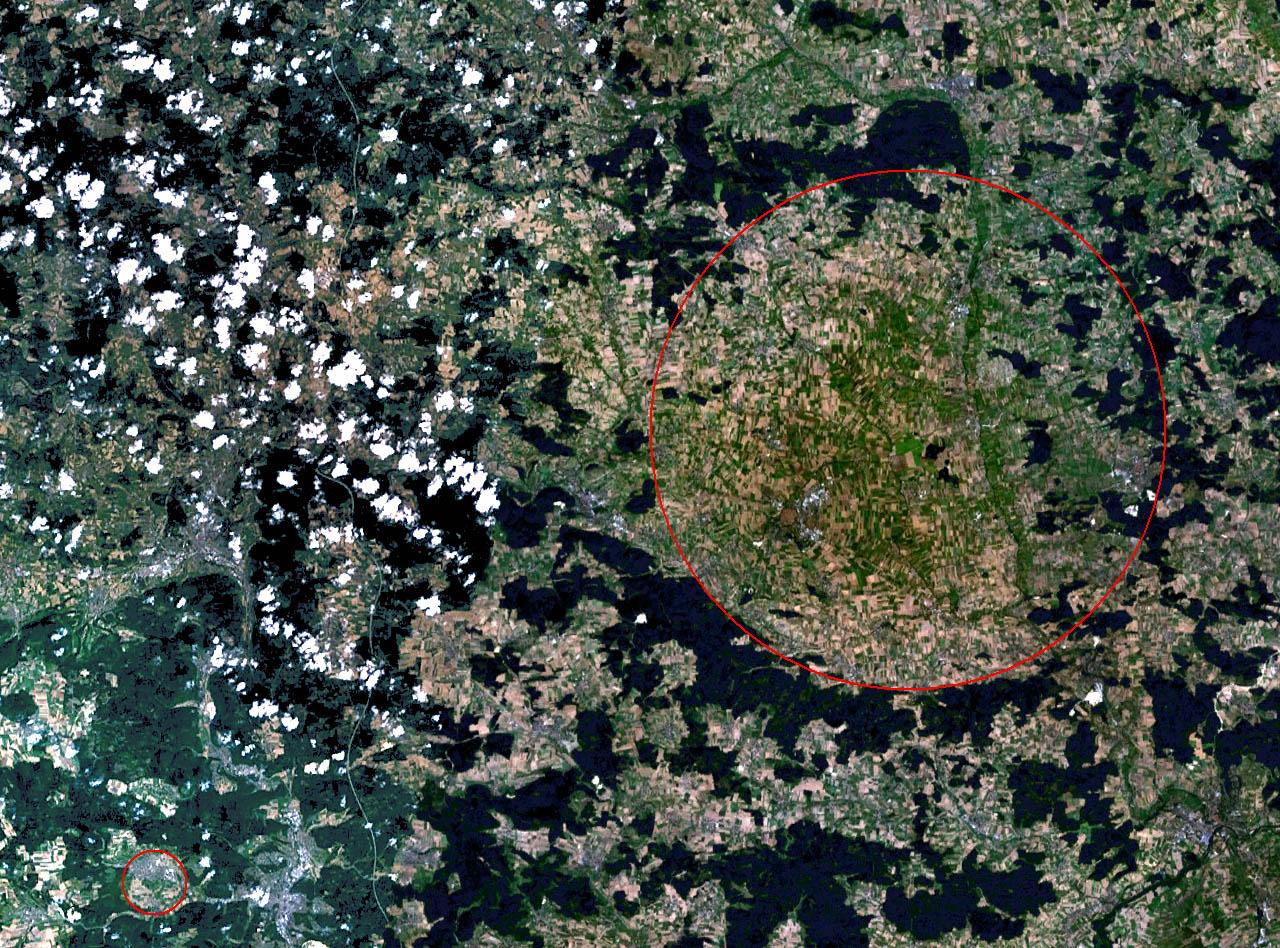
Nördlinger Ries and Steinheimer crater
