= Stefan Rieß =

German footballer

Personal information
- Date of birth: 9 December 1988 (age 37)
- Place of birth: Nördlingen, West Germany
- Height: 1.80 m (5 ft 11 in)
- Position: Midfielder

Youth career
- FV Utzmemmingen
- TSV Nördlingen
- –2003: FC Augsburg
- 2003–2007: Bayern Munich

Senior career*
| Years | Team | Apps | (Gls) |
| 2007–2010 | Bayern Munich II | 46 | (2) |
| 2010–2011 | Karlsruher SC | 1 | (0) |
| 2010–2011 | Karlsruher SC II | 5 | (0) |
| 2011–2012 | FC Lustenau | 20 | (7) |
- * Club domestic league appearances and goals as of 30 April 2013

Stefan Rieß (born 9 December 1988) is a German footballer who plays as a midfielder. He last played for FC Lustenau.

== Career ==
Rieß began his career with FC Bayern Munich, and made his debut for the reserve team in August 2007, as a substitute for Tom Schütz in a mini-Munich derby against TSV 1860 München II. He helped Bayern II qualify for the new 3. Liga, and made 41 appearances in two seasons at this level before leaving in 2010. He then signed for Karlsruher SC of the 2. Bundesliga, but only made one first-team appearance, and left after one season. He signed for FC Lustenau of the Austrian Erste Liga, and made 20 appearances, scoring seven goals, before being dropped from the squad in March 2012 and released at the end of the season.
