= Rebecca Lemp =

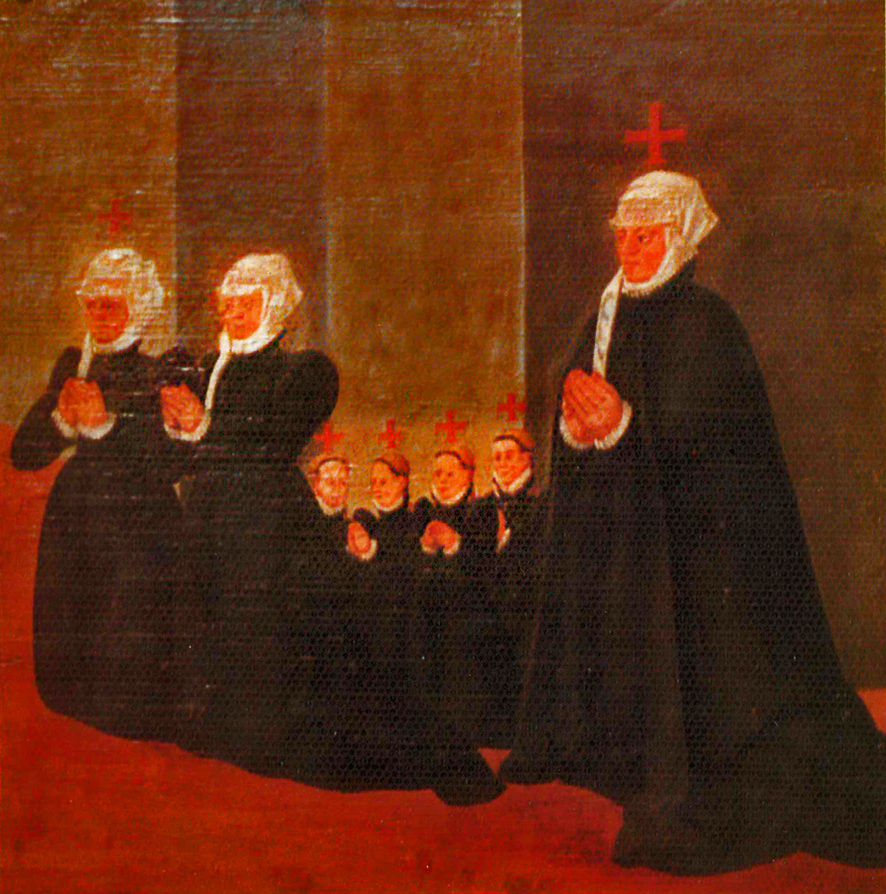
Rebecca Lemp on the Epitaph of the Lemp family (2nd from the left)

Rebecca Lemp (d. 1590) was a German woman who was accused of witchcraft and burned at the stake in Nördlingen.

== Witch hunt ==
Lemp was one of 32 women convicted of witchcraft following a witch hunt in Nördlingen, Germany. Burgomaster George Pheringer led the witch hunt along with lawyers Sebastien Roettinger and Conrad Graf.

Lemp had six children and was married to Peter Lemp, a well-regarded accountant. In April 1590, while he was away on business, she was arrested. Her children wrote to her while she was imprisoned. She wrote to her husband of her innocence, convinced that she would be freed. Lemp was tortured on five occasions and confessed. She wrote again to him, requesting he send her something with which she could end her life. After her letter was intercepted, the court additionally charged her with attempted suicide.

The court coerced Lemp into writing another letter to Peter confessing that she was a witch. He wrote to the court and petitioned to come to her aid and face her accusers. He noted his belief that her confession was forced and described Rebecca as "honest, chaste and pious", having never "entertained an ill or evil thought in her head." He related that she taught her children about the Bible.

Lemp was tortured once more before being burned at the stake on 9 September 1590.
