= Michael Lutz =

German footballer

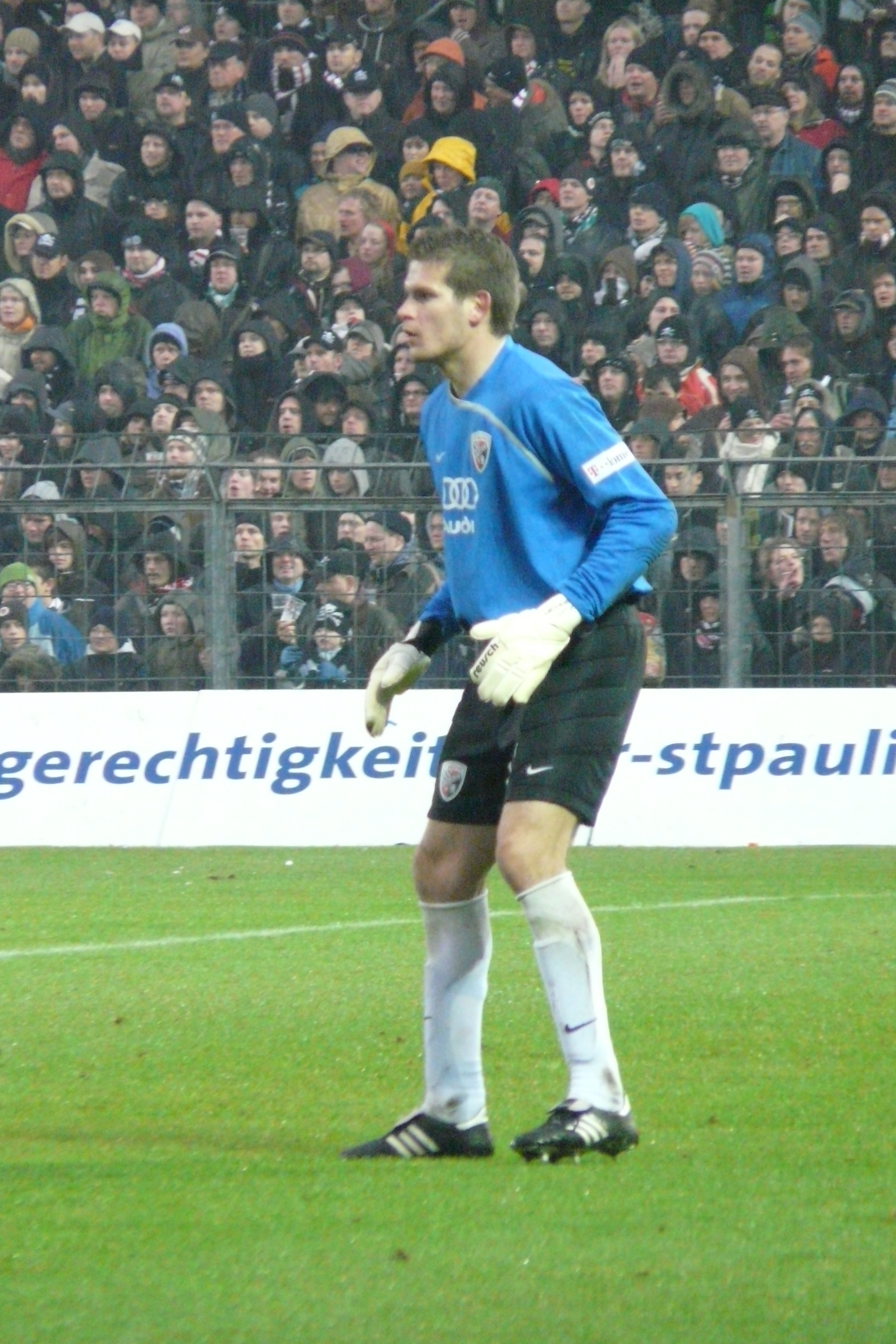

Personal information
- Full name: Michael Lutz
- Date of birth: 25 January 1982 (age 44)
- Place of birth: Nördlingen, West Germany
- Height: 1.92 m (6 ft 4 in)
- Position: Goalkeeper

Youth career
- FSV Reimlingen
- –2002: FC Augsburg

Senior career*
Years	Team	Apps	(Gls)
2002–2011	FC Ingolstadt	122	(0)
2011–2012	SV Waldhof Mannheim	1	(0)
2012–2014	BC Aichach	66	(0)
2014–2016	TSV Rain	45	(0)
2016–2017	TSV Nördlingen	33	(0)
Total		267	(0)

Managerial career
- 2017–: 1.FC Heidenheim U15 (goalkeeping coach)
- * Club domestic league appearances and goals

Michael Lutz (born 25 January 1982) is a German former professional footballer who played as a goalkeeper.
