= Els von Eystett =

Fifteenth-century German prostitute

Els von Eystett (also Els von Eichstätt) was a woman who worked in a public brothel in Nördlingen, Germany, in the late fifteenth century. Els originally worked in the brothel as a kitchen maid and later as a prostitute. Her experiences are documented in the records of a criminal investigation carried out by the city council of Nördlingen between December 1471 and January 1472.

The investigation was first prompted by rumours that Els had become pregnant by a customer, and had subsequently been forced by the brothel madam to finish her pregnancy by means of a herbal abortifacient. The inquiry later expanded to involve the interrogation of all twelve women working in Nördlingen's brothel in the latter half of 1471, as well as the brothel madam Barbara Tarscheinfeindin and brothel-keeper Lienhart Fryermut. As several of the women in the brothel had left Nördlingen by the time the interrogations began (including Els herself) the investigation also involved cooperation between the authorities in Nördlingen and the city councils of Nuremberg and Weißenburg in Bayern.

Original transcriptions of the women's testimony are held today in Nördlingen's civic archive. The case record offers the most comprehensive vision of prostitution currently known to have survived from medieval Europe which shows the perspectives of prostitutes themselves. Els's story has been the subject of several book chapters, magazine articles, a TV documentary, and a theatrical production, and has been the focus of modern research into prostitution in medieval Europe.

== Prostitution in medieval Europe ==
Public brothels of the kind that Els von Eystett worked in were a common feature in towns across much of western Europe in the period ca. 1350–1550. Although the medieval Church condemned prostitution and saw prostitutes themselves as sinful women, it was generally accepted that tolerating prostitution in society represented a lesser evil than banning it altogether. This position was upheld by a number of major ecclesiastical figures including St. Augustine and St. Thomas Aquinas.

In southern and central Germany, where public brothels were much more common than in the north, brothels typically operated on a leaseholder model which saw a brothel-keeper (Frauenwirt/in) pay civic authorities for the right to run the brothel. Rules governing the relationship between brothel-keepers and the authorities were set out in lease agreements, and frequently in oaths sworn by brothel-keepers which required them to make promises of loyalty and obedience. These documents frequently also contained 'house rules' specifying the behaviour forbidden in brothels (such as drunkenness and blasphemy) and governing the relations between prostitutes and the brothel-keeper.

Prostitutes themselves typically lived in the brothel, and as well as paying for board and lodging were required to give the brothel-keeper a certain amount of the money they received from clients. This usually amounted to one third of their earnings. Most cities permitted brothel-keepers to contract debts with prostitutes or to accept women as pawns, requiring them to pay off debts through their labour. Partly as a consequence of this, prostitutes were often heavily in debt to brothel-keepers, and many were traded between brothels.

== The Nördlingen investigations of 1471–2 ==
The transcriptions produced from the testimony of Els von Eystett and the other women of Nördlingen's brothel form the primary source of information about the investigation. Sentencing records for Barbara Tarschenfeindin and Lienhart Fryermut are also held in Nördlingen's civic archive in the city's so-called blood book (Blutbuch), a medieval and early modern record of criminal punishments, and the town's collection of Urfehden, a form of judicial oath.

The women's statements indicate that the investigation proceeded along two lines: a specific inquiry into the rumours of Els's abortion, and a more general inquiry into the working conditions in the brothel, ostensibly prompted by Els's claims of other abuses by Barbara and Lienhart. The proceedings were handled by the Nördlingen city council, which in common with other Free Imperial Cities at the time, functioned as both executive and judiciary.

Proceedings were made more complex by the fact that three of the women who had witnessed events surrounding the alleged abortion had left Nördlingen by the time the investigation began. Els herself had gone to Weißenburg in Bayern, while Margrette von Biberach and Ursel von Konstanz had both gone to Nuremberg.

== Inquiry into working conditions ==
Proceedings in Nördlingen began with the inquiry into the working conditions in the brothel. Each woman working there at the time of the investigation was first asked a set of questions pertaining to how they had been treated by Lienhart and Barbara, and whether they had experienced specific abuses at their hands. The first witness was named Anna von Ulm, whose testimony supplied the majority of the evidence. Those who followed her were named Adelhait von Sindelfingen, Anna von Schaffhausen, Catrin von Nürnberg, Chündlin von Augsburg, Cristina von der Etsch, Els von Nürnberg, Enndlin von Schaffhausen, Margrette von Biberach, and Wÿchselbrunn von Ulm. Another woman, Ursel von Konstanz, had since left Nördlingen to work in Nuremberg's public brothel; she was therefore interrogated by the Nuremberg city council at the request of the council in Nördlingen, who received a copy of her statement.

The women's testimony revealed a widespread pattern of abuse and exploitation at the hands of Lienhart Fryermut and Barbara Tarschenfeindin. This included practices such as forcing the women to work while menstruating; forcing them to work on holy days; denying them the chance to go to church to hear Mass; confiscating their clothes and forcing them to buy items from them at excessive prices; feeding them disgusting food; forcing them to spin cloth to generate extra income; seizing tips given to them by customers and taking more than the permitted one-third cut from their wages. Many of the women said they had routinely suffered violence at Lienhart's hands, and that he sometimes used a bullwhip to beat them. Almost all of the women stated that they were in debt to Lienhart and as a consequence were unable to leave the brothel, notwithstanding the fact that he forbade them to leave the building most of the time.

== The abortion inquiry ==
As well as testifying about working conditions in the brothel, many of the women also described the events surrounding the alleged abortion of Els von Eystett's child, including Els herself. Els claimed in her own statement that she had first complained of abdominal pains to Barbara. Barbara had told her that she was merely suffering from amenorrhea, and stated that she would mix up a drink to bring on menstruation. Having dispatched Anna von Ulm and Margrette von Biberach to fetch ingredients from the market, Barbara then mixed together periwinkle, cloves, carrot (likely to have been daucus carota, a known abortifacient) and strong wine into a hot draught, which, Els claimed, she was forced to drink.

Several witnesses including Els, Margrette von Biberach and Anna von Ulm testified that the drink rapidly brought on strong abdominal pains. This caused Els to miscarried a male foetus which Els herself estimated to be twenty weeks old. After her miscarriage Els was forced to return to work, and revealed to at least one customer what had happened to her. After rumours of what had happened had reached the city council, but before the latter had acted, Barbara and Lienhart agreed to release Els from her debts and allow her to leave the brothel, on the condition that she not reveal what had happened; having left Nördlingen, Els subsequently went to Weißenburg in Bayern, where she was eventually tracked down after the investigation was launched in Nördlingen.

== Consequences of the investigation ==
Following the interrogation of the women of Nördlingen's brothel, both Lienhart Fryermut and Barbara Tarschenfeindin were themselves interrogated. Barbara was found guilty of causing the abortion of Els von Eystett's child. Although Nördlingen's town law contained no explicit reference to abortion, convictions of abortion in German-speaking towns in the fifteenth century usually resulted in the expulsion of the guilty party. Barbara was consequently put on the pillory before being branded across the forehead and banished across the Rhine in perpetuity.

Lienhart was dismissed from his post as brothel-keeper and forced to swear an oath (the Urfehde) in which he renounced the right to take vengeance and acknowledged his own banishment from the town.

In 1472, a new ordinance (Frauenhausordnung) was drawn up for the running of Nördlingen's brothel containing a number of provisions intended to prevent abuses of the kind reported by the women at the investigation. The extent to which these new rules were ever in force is nevertheless doubtful as the ordinance was never bound into the town's collection of statutes.

No further historical records pertaining to Els von Eystett survive; after giving her testimony, nothing more is known of her life.
