= Ofnet Caves =

Nature reserve in Bavaria, Germany

- Ofnethöhlen (German)
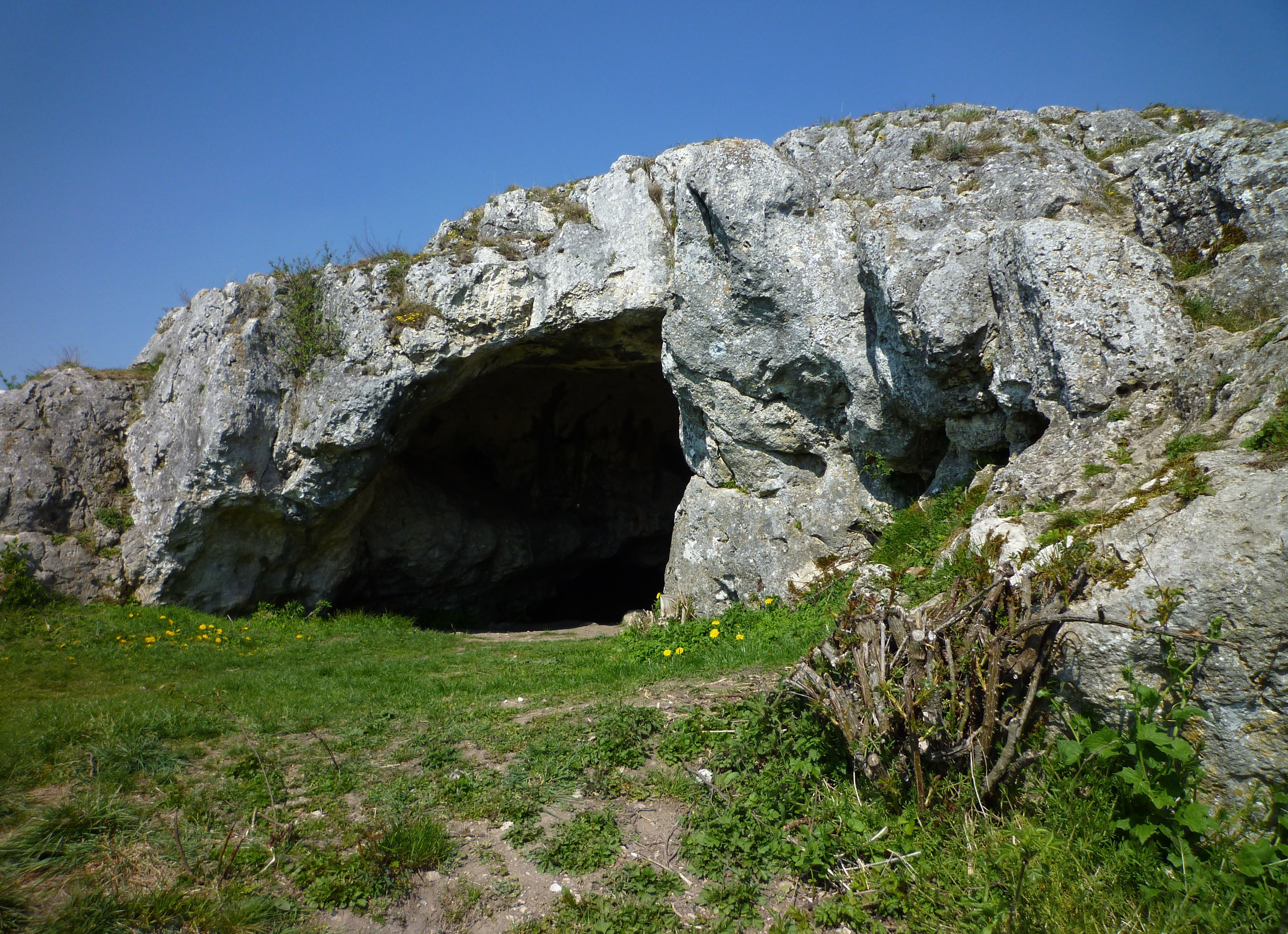
- Large Ofnet Cave

- location in Germany Ofnet Caves (Germany)
- 48°49′7″N 10°27′1″E
- Type: Cave
- Periods: Mesolithic
- Location: Nördlingen

The Ofnet Caves (German: Ofnethöhlen) are the remains of an underground karst system on the edge of the Nördlinger Ries in Germany. They are located on a limestone hill near Nördlingen, Bavaria. The caves became famous in 1908 when 33 prehistoric human skulls were discovered. The skulls were dated to the Mesolithic period.

== Description ==
There are two caves (or rock shelters) called the Grosse and Kleine Ofnet (Large and Small Ofnet).

=== Skull remains ===
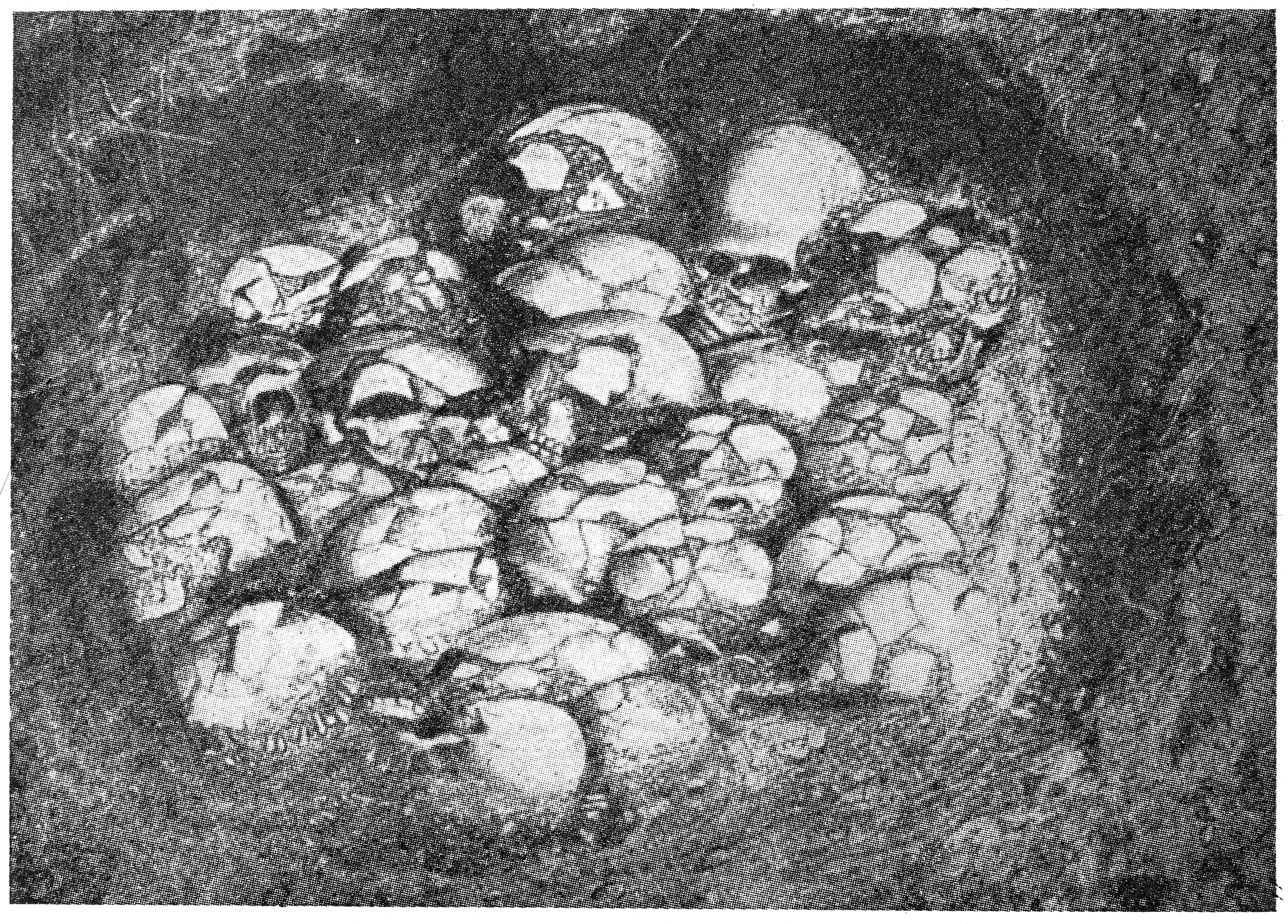
Part of great skull burial at Ofnet

In the Grosse Ofnet in 1908 archaeologist R. R. Schmidt found two dish-shaped pits in which human skulls were lying "like eggs in flat baskets". In the larger pit were 27 skulls and in the other there were 6 skulls. The skulls were arranged concentrically with their faces turned towards the setting sun. They were all covered with a thick layer of red ochre. The skulls have been dated to the 7th millennium BC.
