= Gramophone (disambiguation) =

Gramophone or phonograph is a device for the mechanical recording and reproduction of sound.

Gramophone may also refer to:

== Businesses ==
- Gramophone Company, a British record company
- Gramophone Company of India or Saregama, an Indian record company
- Berliner Gramophone, an early American record company
- Deutsche Grammophon, a German classical music record label

== Other uses ==
- Gramophone (film), a 2003 Indian film
- Gramophone (magazine), a British monthly classical music publication
  - Gramophone Classical Music Awards, annual honours for the classical music industry
- Grammy Award or Gramophone Award, annual awards presented by The Recording Academy
- Gramophone, a 1986 album by Echo City

== See also ==
- Gramaphone Records, a music store in Chicago, U.S.
