= Robert Beyschlag =

German painter (1838–1903)

Robert Julius Beyschlag (1838–1903) was a German painter.

== Life ==
Robert Julius Beyschlag was born in Nördlingen on 1 July 1838. He studied at the Akademie der Bildenden Künste, Munich. He was a painter of mythological subjects, figures, and genre scenes. His works include: Nymphs; Conversation at the Well; Iphigenia's Farewell; The Parting of Orpheus and Eurydice; and studies of women's heads and figures from different centuries, which were published as collotypes in 1885 under the title Frauenlob. He also painted a fresco in the Bayerisches Nationalmuseum, Munich. He died in Munich on 15 December 1903, aged 65.

== Gallery ==
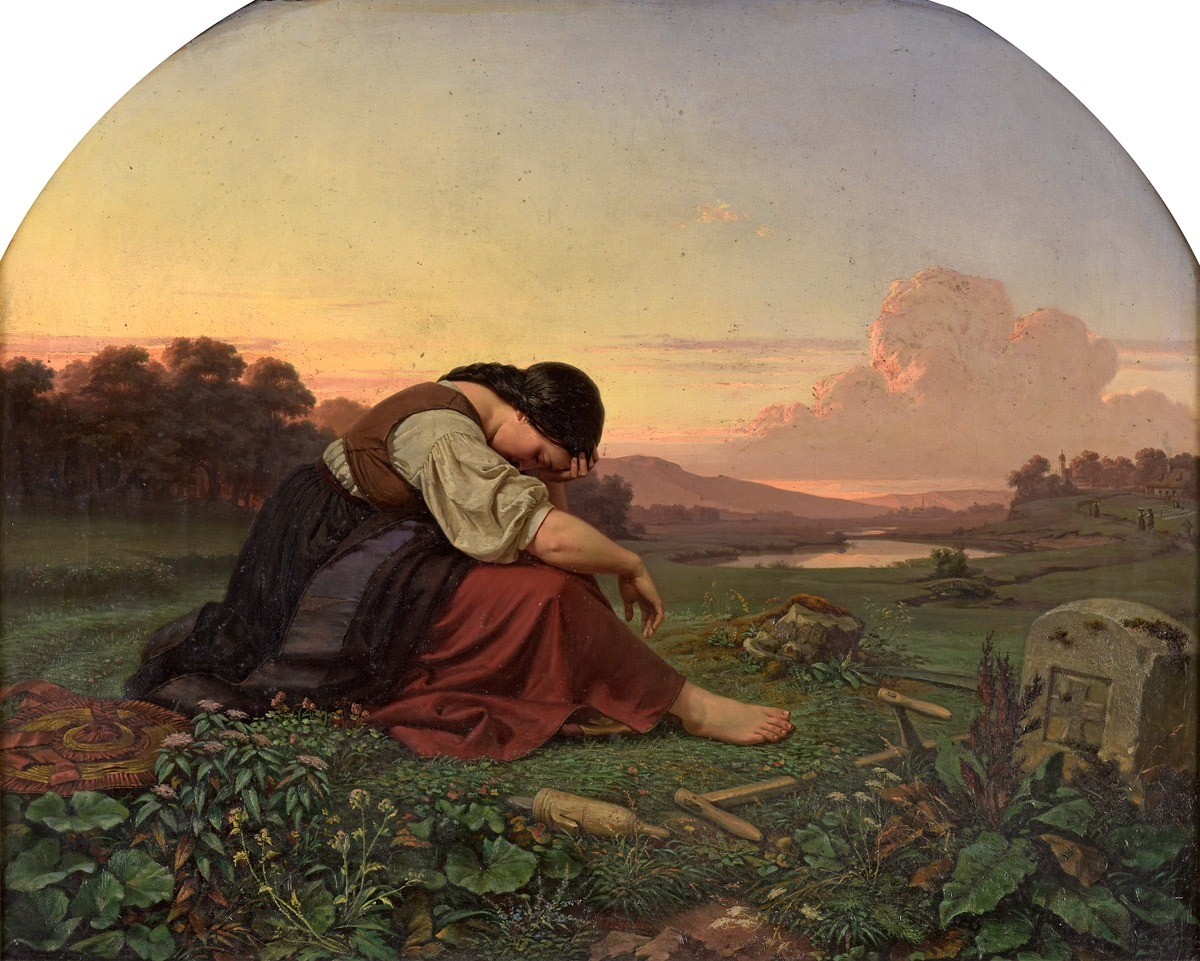
Ein stiller Moment
('A Quiet Moment')

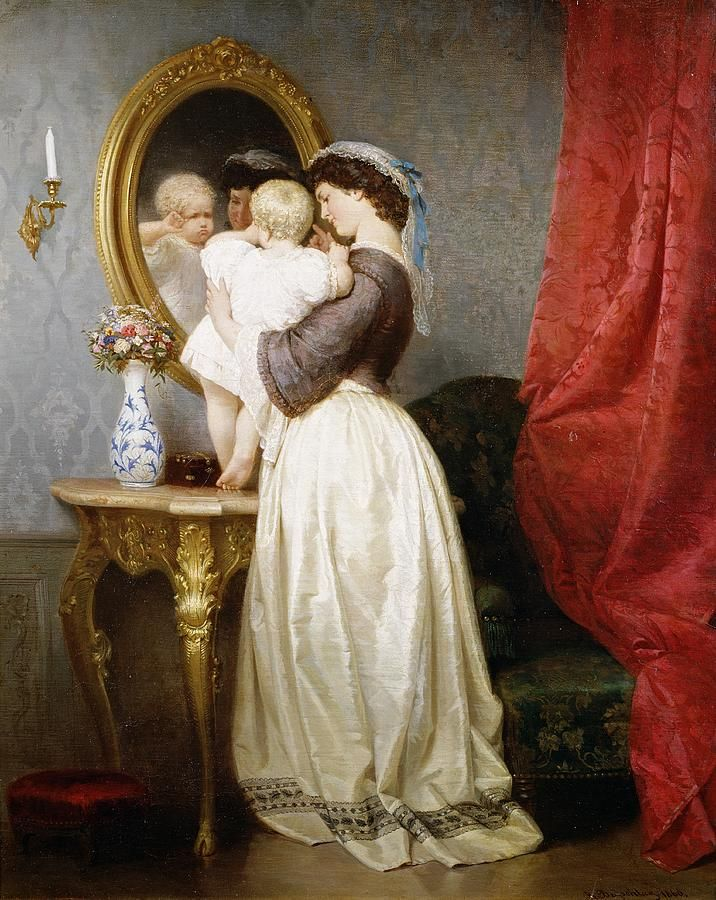
Reflections of Maternal Love

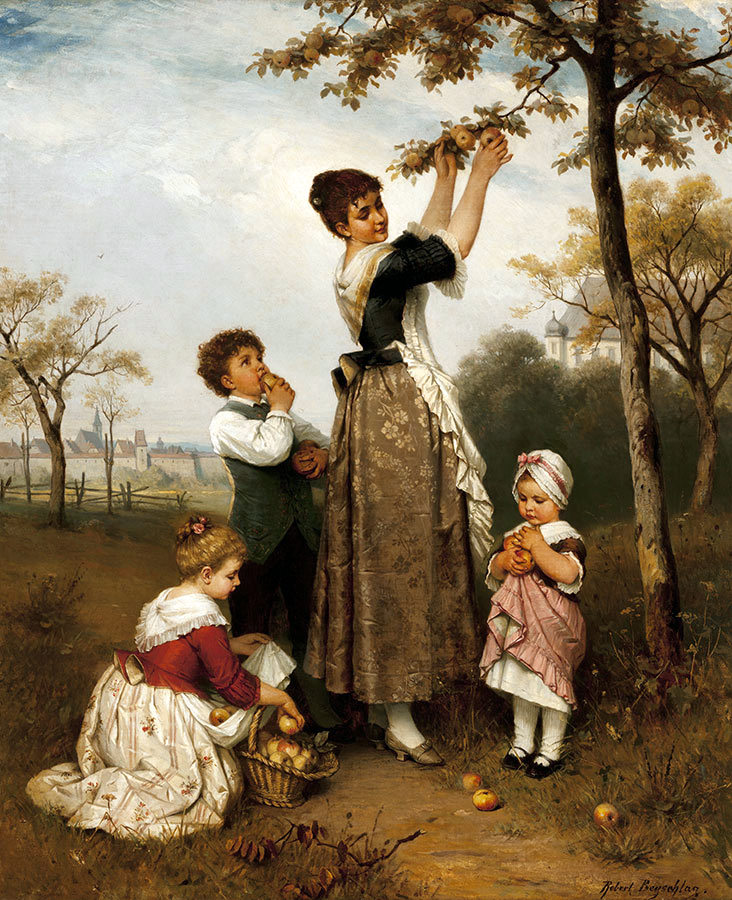
Picking Apples

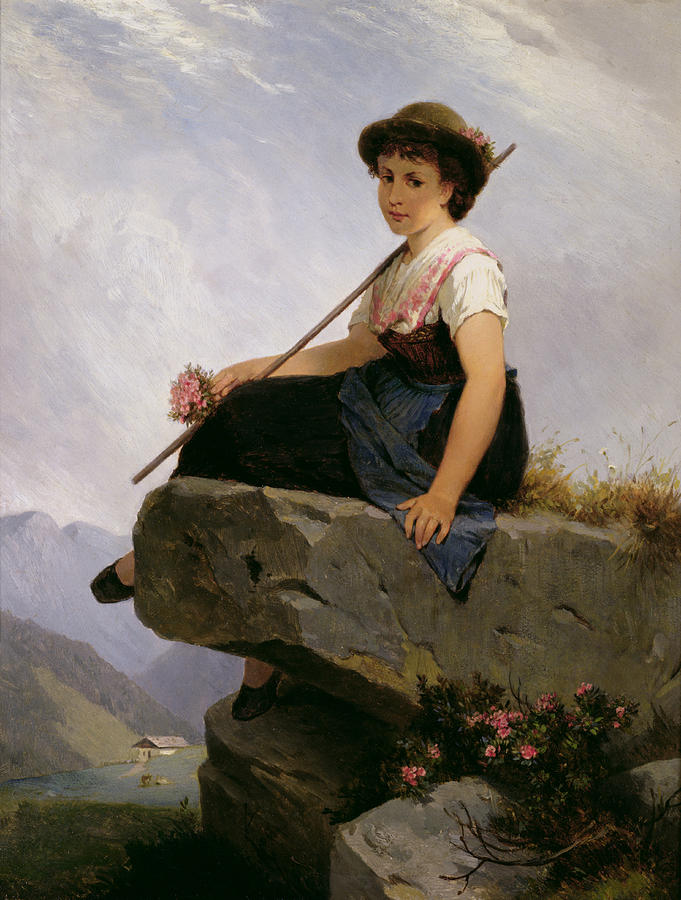
Contemplation

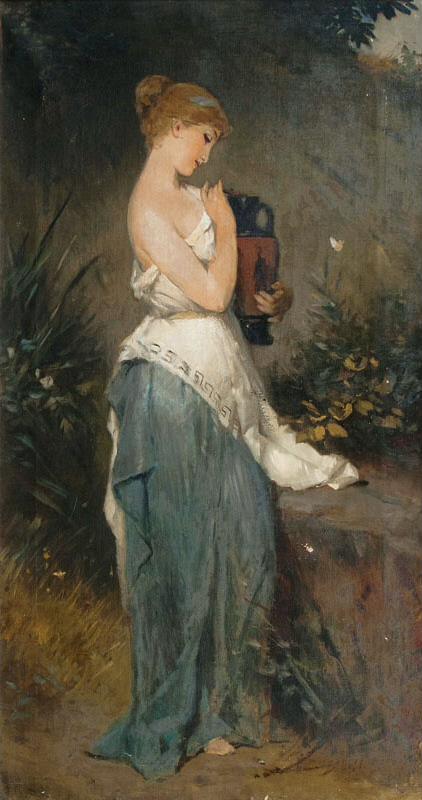
Psyche

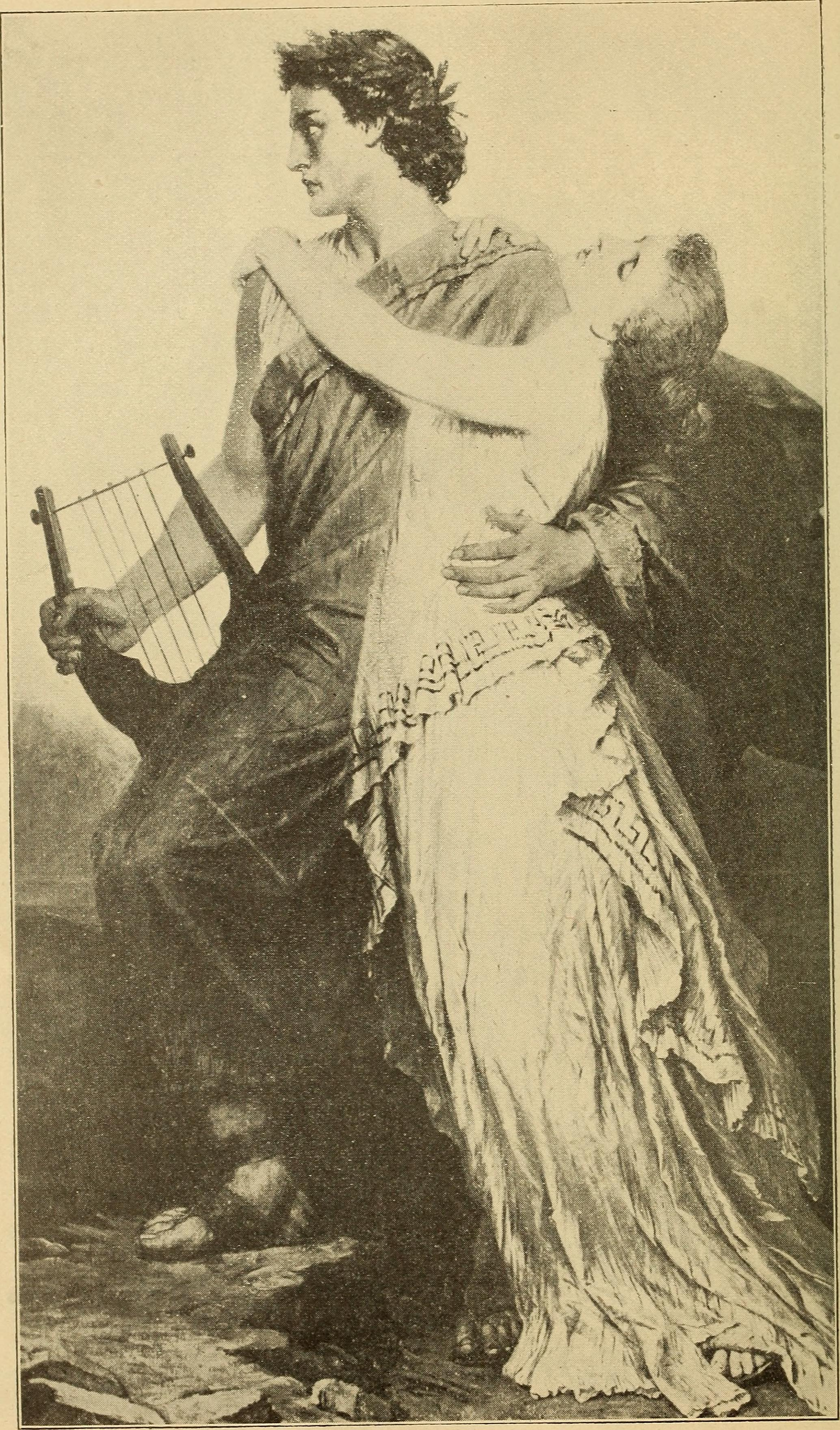
Orpheus and Eurydice

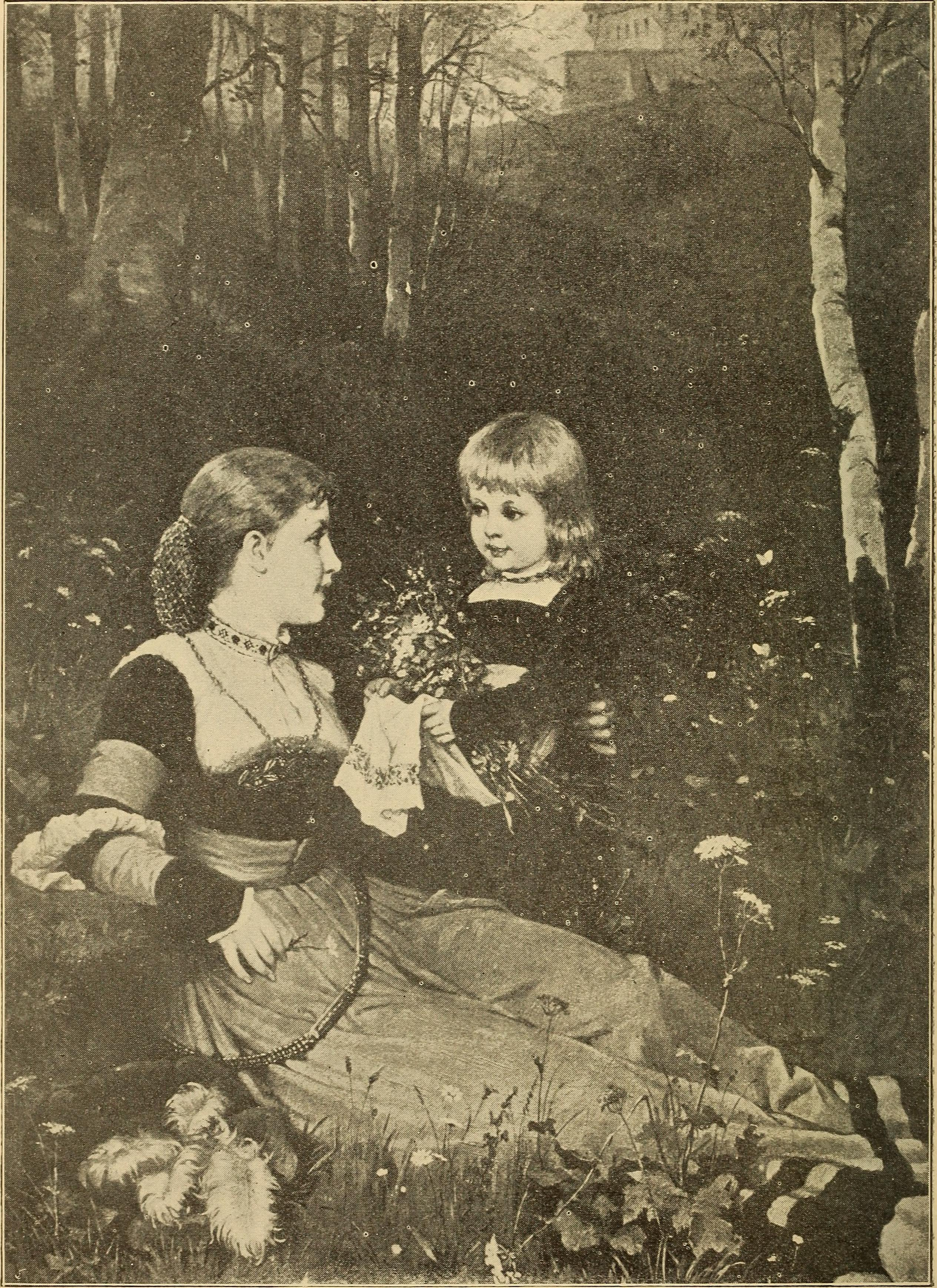
In the Forest

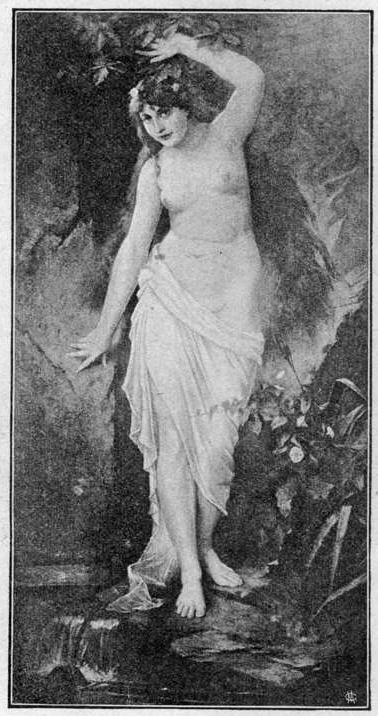
Die Quelle
('The Source')

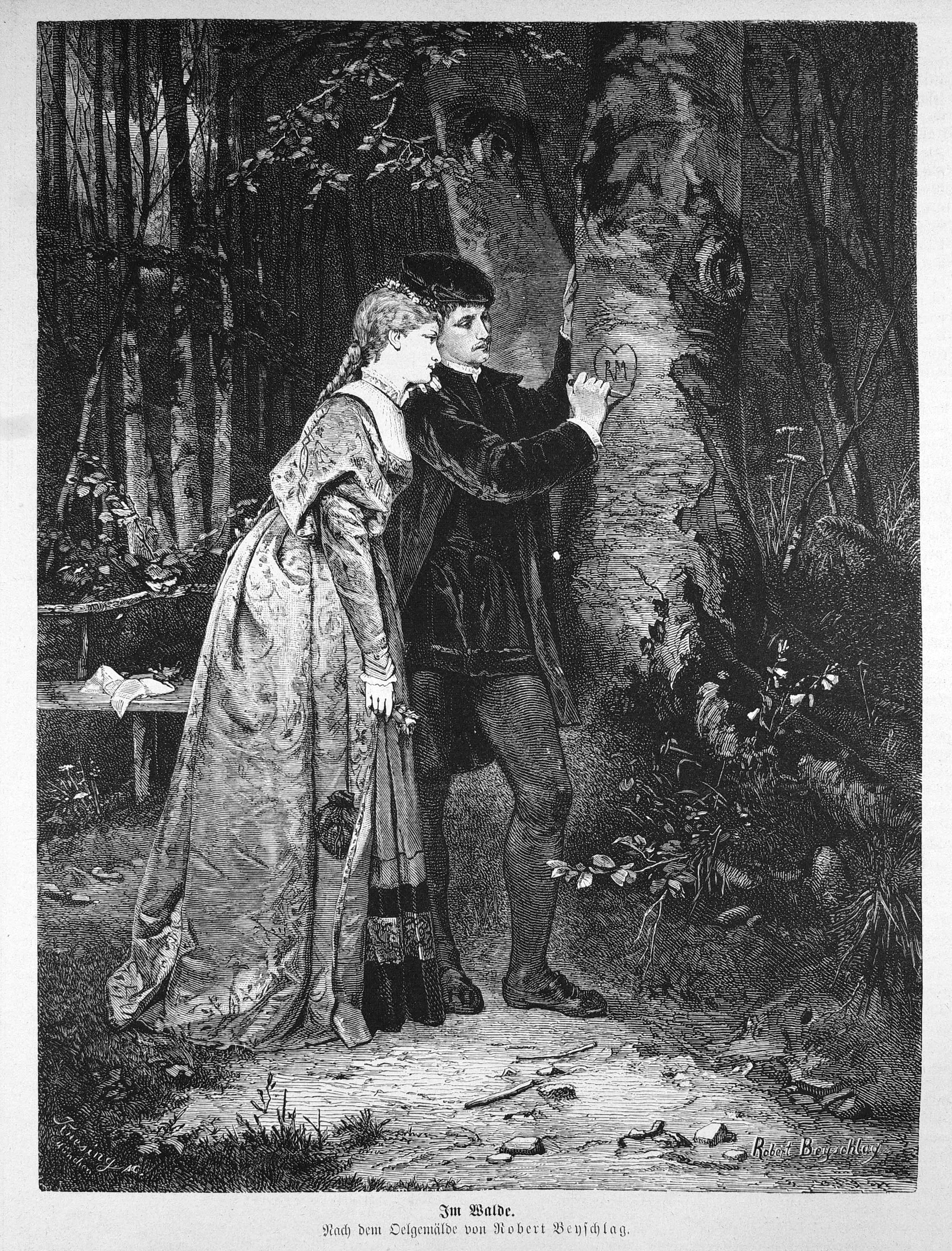
Die Gartenlaube, 1874

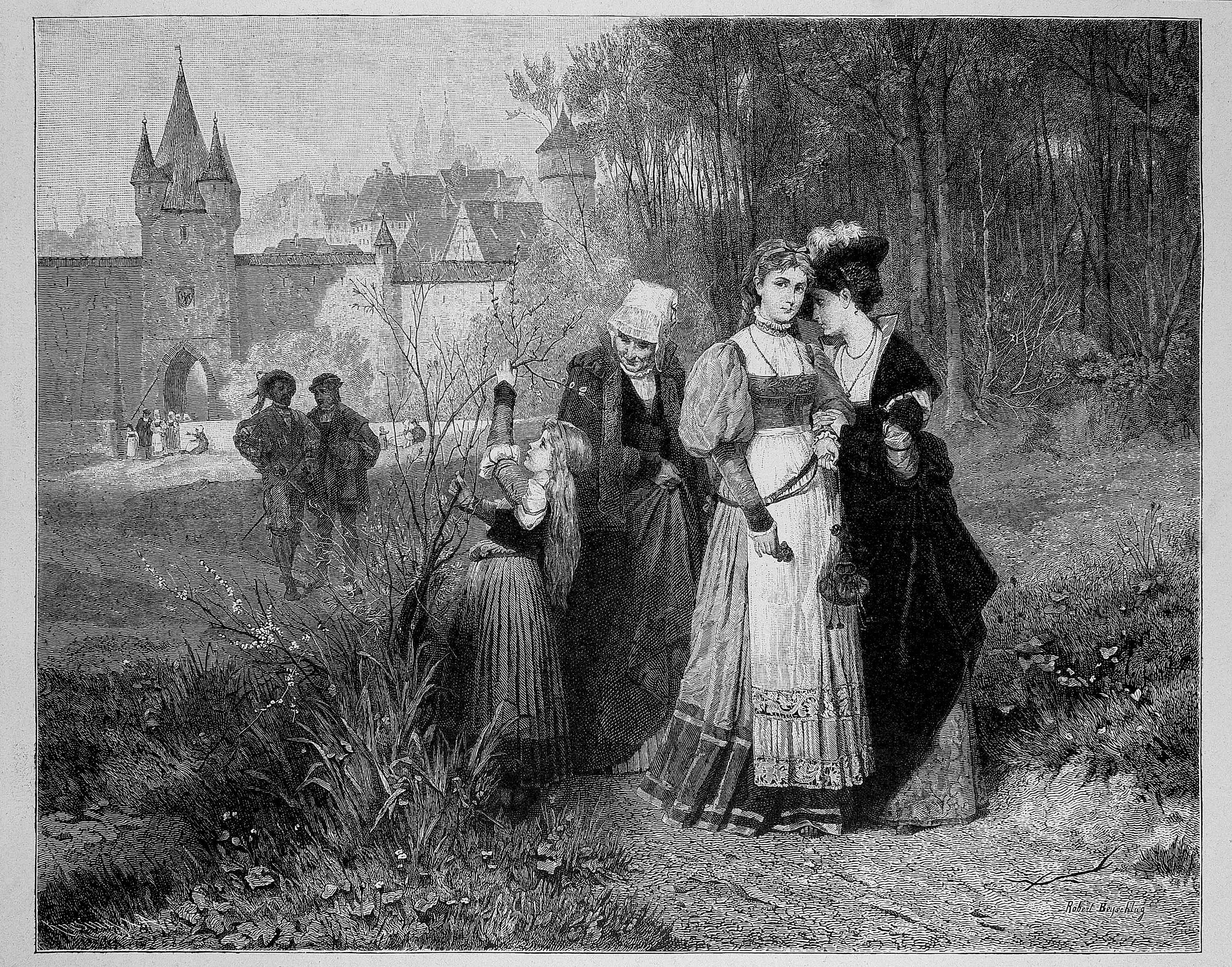
Die Gartenlaube, 1881

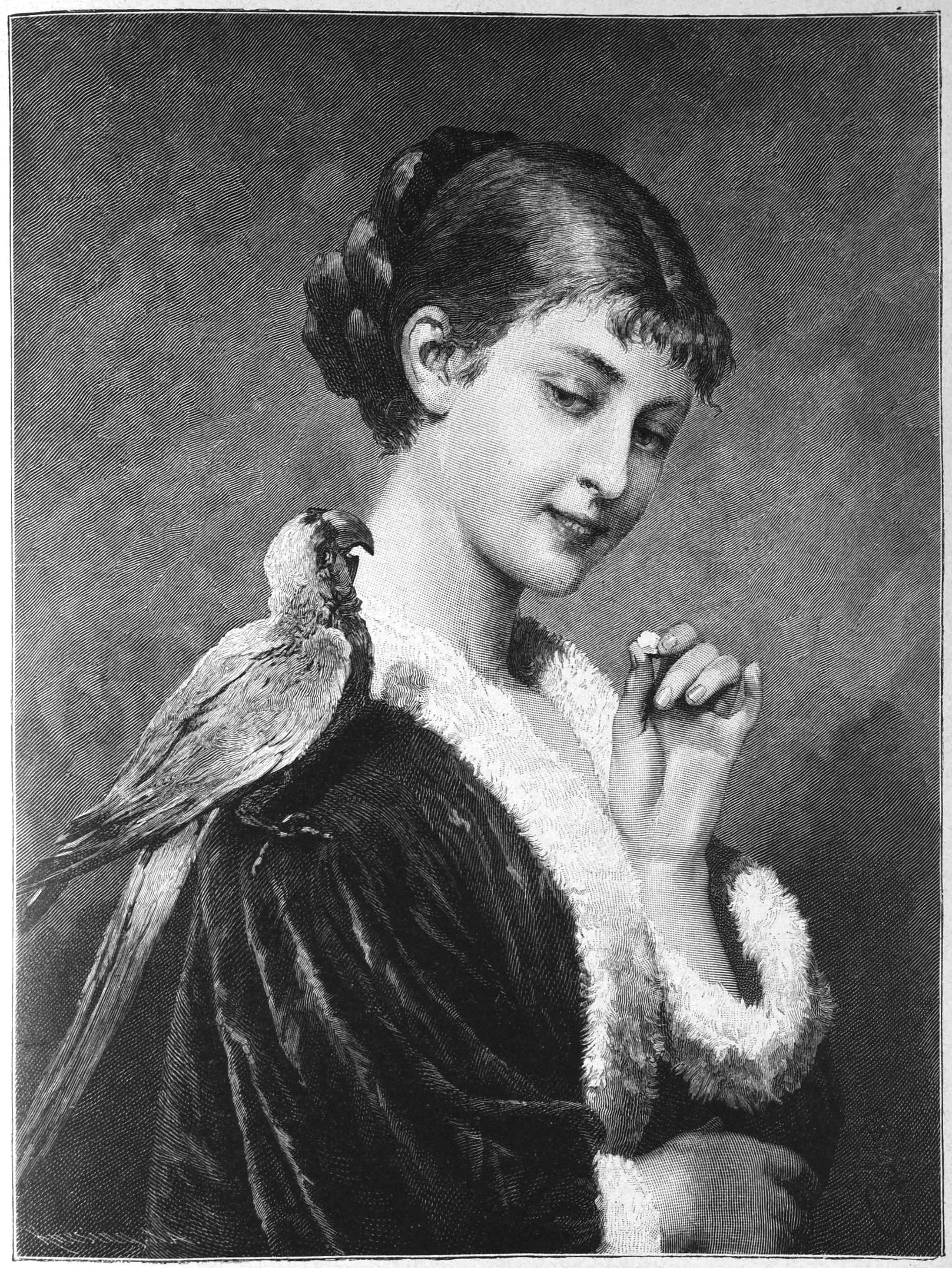
Die Gartenlaube, 1882

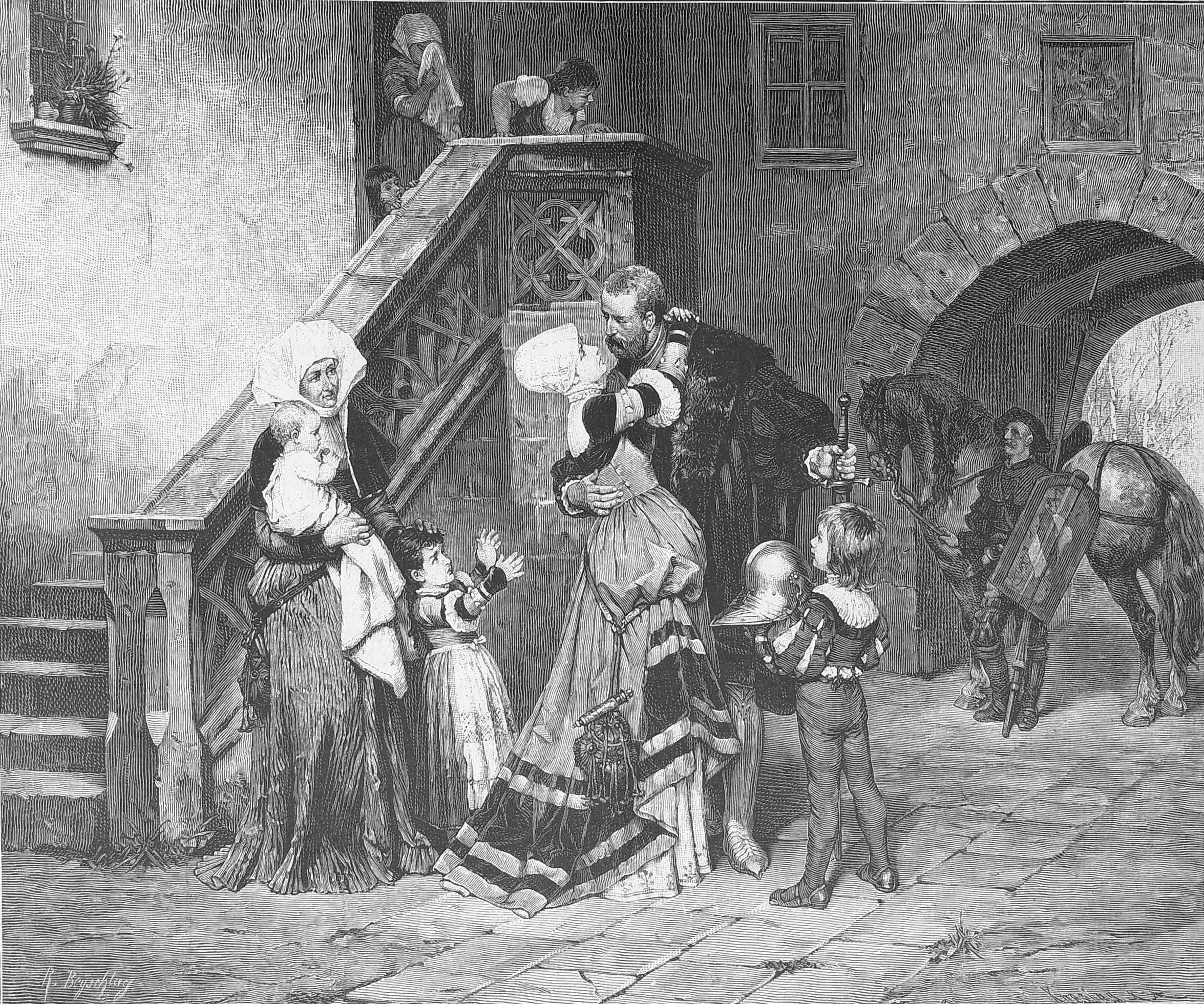
Die Gartenlaube, 1886

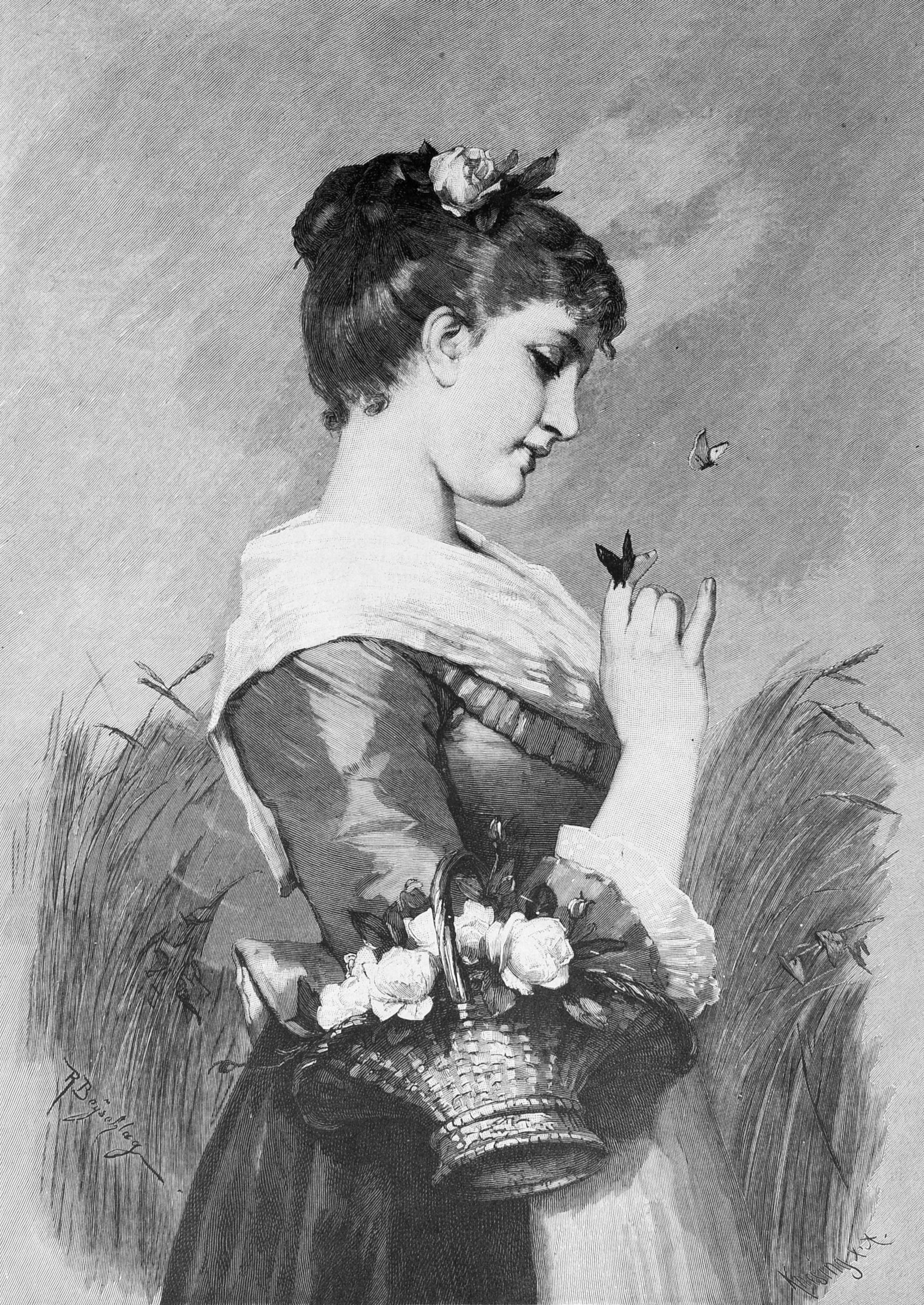
Die Gartenlaube, 1886

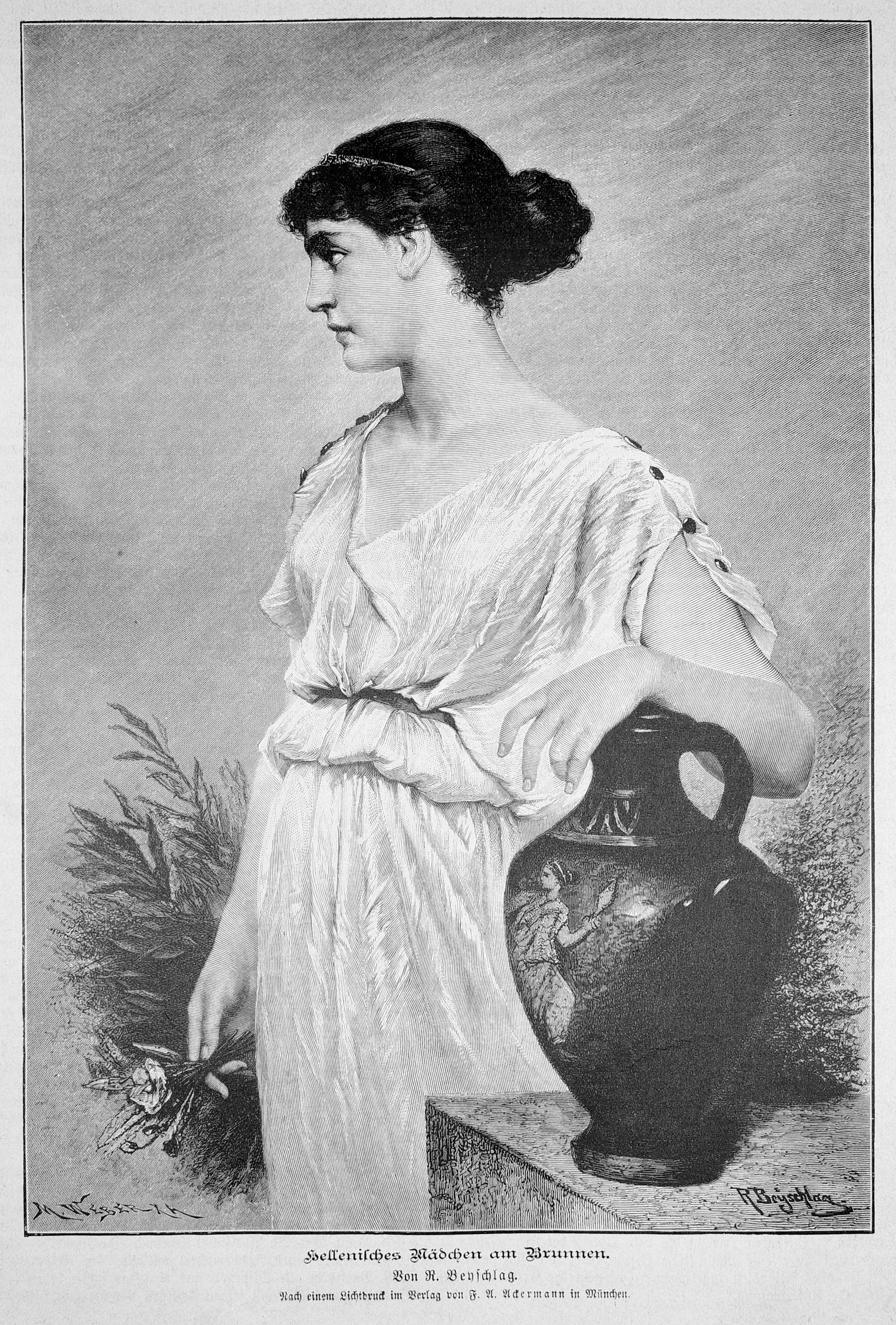
Die Gartenlaube, 1887

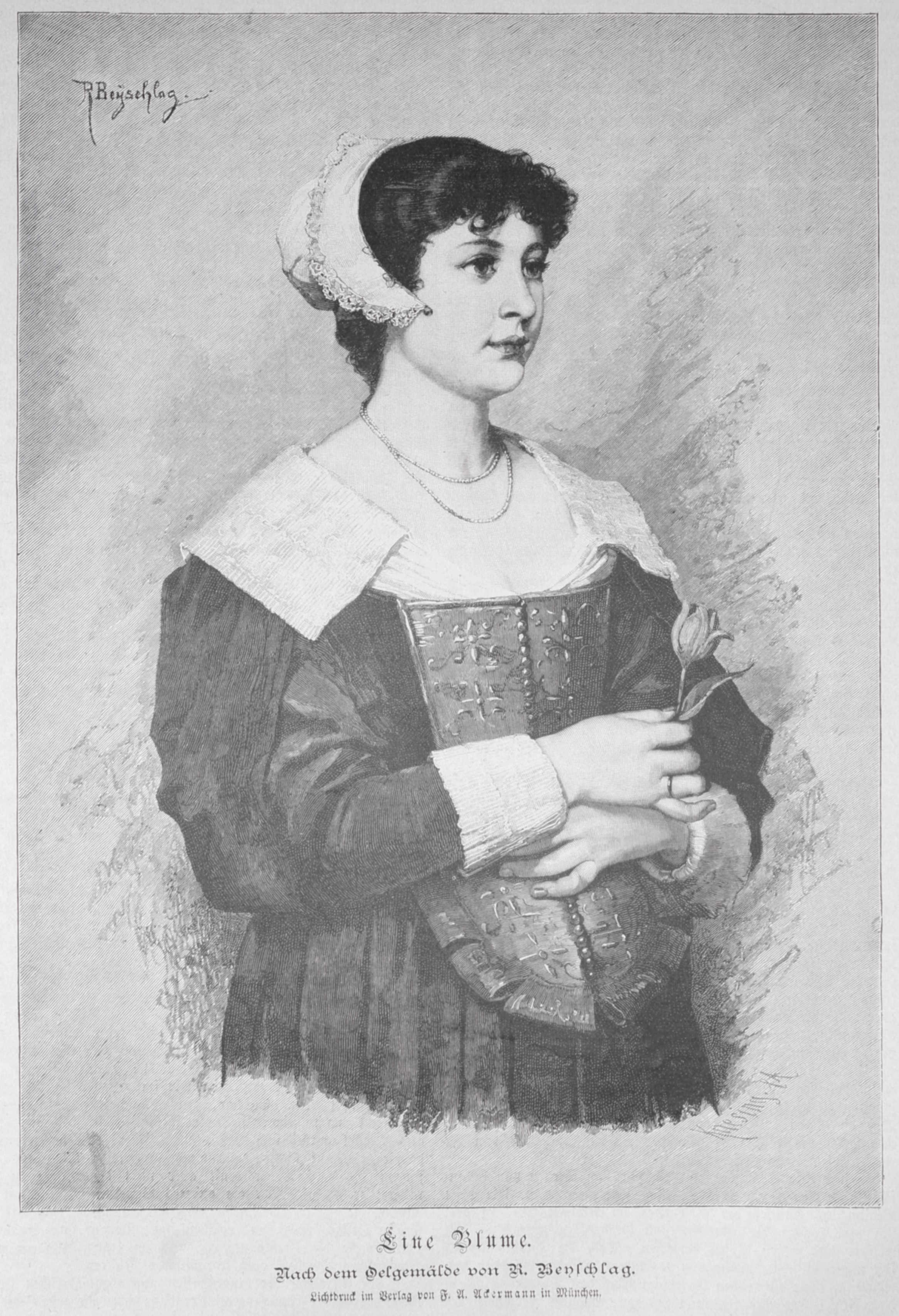
Die Gartenlaube, 1888

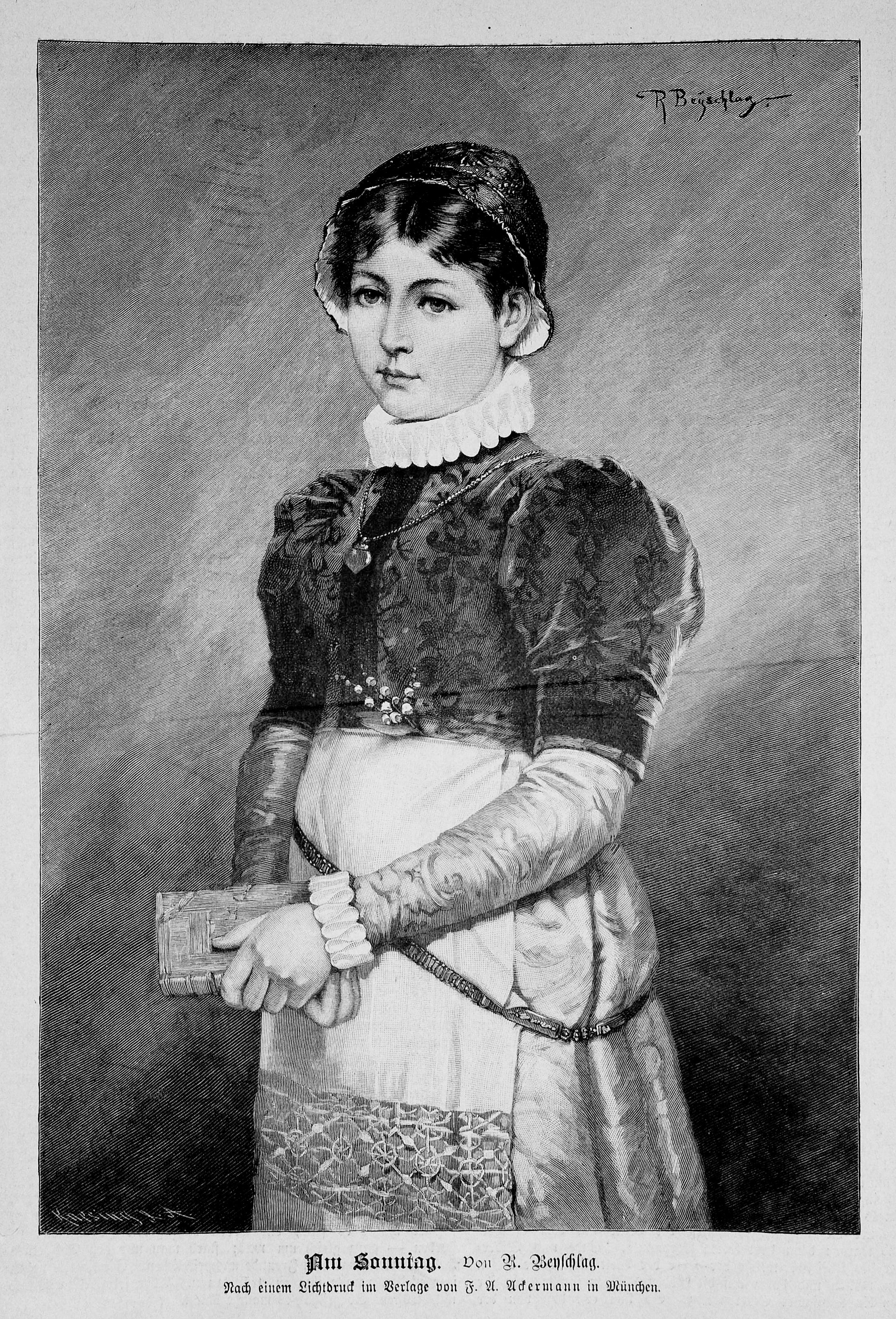
Die Gartenlaube, 1888

== Sources ==
- Wiench, Peter (2021). "Beyschlag, Robert Julius". In Beyer, Andreas; Savoy, Bénédicte; Tegethoff, Wolf (eds.). Allgemeines Künstlerlexikon - Internationale Künstlerdatenbank - Online. K. G. Saur. Retrieved 10 October 2022.
- "Beyschlag, Robert". Benezit Dictionary of Artists. 2011. Oxford Art Online. Retrieved 10 October 2022.
