= Karl Heinrich Lang =

German historian and statesman (1764–1835)

Karl Heinrich Ritter von Lang
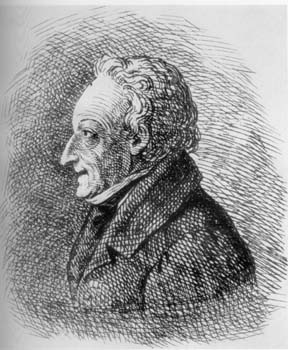
- Karl Heinrich Lang
- Born: 7 June 1764; Balgheim, near Nördlingen, Holy Roman Empire
- Died: 26 March 1835 (aged 70); Ansbach, Kingdom of Bavaria
- Education: University of Altdorf
- Occupations: Historian, statesman
- Notable work: Memoiren (1842, republished 1881)
- Awards: Merit Order of the Bavarian Crown (1808)

Karl Heinrich Ritter von Lang (7 June 1764 – 26 March 1835) was a German historian and statesman.

== Life ==
He was born at Balgheim, near Nördlingen. From the first he was greatly attracted towards historical studies, and this was shown when he began to attend the gymnasium of Oettingen, and in 1782, when he went to the University of Altdorf, near Nuremberg. At the same time he studied jurisprudence, and in 1782 became a government clerk at Oettingen. About the same period he began his activities as a journalist and publicist.

But Lang did not long remain an official. He was of a restless, changeable character, which constantly involved him in personal quarrels, though he was equally quick to retire from them. In 1788 he obtained a position as private tutor in Hungary in family of Johann Calisius from Calish and Johanna Prónay in Bitsitz (today Bytčica, Slovakia), and in 1789 became private secretary to Baron von Buhler, the envoy of Württemberg at Vienna. This led to further travels and to his entering the service of the House of Oettingen-Wallerstein. In 1792 Lang again betook himself to a university, this time to Göttingen. Here he came under the influence of the historian, Ludwig Timotheus Spittler, from whom, as also from Johannes von Muller and Friedrich Schlegel, his historical studies received a fresh impulse.

At intervals from 1793 to 1801 Lang was closely connected with the Prussian statesman Hardenberg, who employed him as his private secretary and archivist, and in 1797 he was present with Hardenberg at the Second Congress of Rastatt as secretary to the legation. He was occupied chiefly with affairs of the principalities of Ansbach and Bayreuth, newly acquired by Prussia, and especially in the settlement of disputes with Bavaria as to their boundaries.

When in 1805 the principalities became part of Bavaria, Lang entered the Bavarian service (1806), was presented with the Merit Order of the Bavarian Crown in 1808, and from 1810 to 1817 held the office of archivist in Munich. He again devoted himself with great enthusiasm to historical studies, which naturally dealt chiefly with Bavarian history. He evolved the theory, among other things, that the boundaries of the old counties or pagi (Gaue) were identical with those of the dioceses. This theory was combated in later days, and caused great confusion in the province of historical geography. For the rest, Lang did great service to the study of the history of Bavaria, especially by bringing fresh material from the archives to bear upon it. He also kept up his activity as a publicist, in 1814 defending in a detailed and somewhat biassed pamphlet the policy of the minister Montgelas, and he undertook critical studies in the history of the Jesuits. In 1817 Lang retired from active life, and until his death in 1835, lived chiefly in Ansbach.

Lang is best known through his Memoiren, which were published in Brunswick in two parts in 1842, and were republished in 1881 in a second edition. They contain much of interest for the history of the period, but have to be used with the greatest caution on account of their pronounced tendency to satire. Lang's character, as can be gathered especially from a consideration of his behaviour at Munich, is darkened by many shadows. He did not scruple, for instance, to strike out of the lists of witnesses to medieval charters, before publishing them, the names of families which he disliked.

== Selected works ==
Of his numerous literary productions the following may be mentioned:

- Beiträge zur Kenntnis der natürlichen und politischen Verfassung des oettingischen Vaterlandes (1786)
- Ein Votum über den Wucher von einem Manne sine voto (1791)
- Historische Entwicklung der deutschen Steuerverfassungen (1793)
- Historische Prüfung des vermeintlichen Alters der deutschen Landstände (1796)
- Neuere Geschichte des Fürstentums Bayreuth (1486–1603) (1798–1811)
- Tabellen uber Flächeninhalt &c. und bevorstehende Verluste der deutschen Reichsstände. (On the occasion of the congress of Rastadt, 1798)
- Der Minister Graf von Montgelas (1814)
- Geschichte der Jesuiten in Bayern (1819)
- Bayerns Gauen (Nuremberg, 1830)
