= Haubitz + Zoche =

Duo of German artists

Sabine Haubitz and Stefanie Zoche were two German artists who worked together as Haubitz + Zoche from 1998 to 2014. Their partnership ended with the death of Haubitz from an accident in March 2014.

Haubitz + Zoche produced photographic works, videos and site-specific installations. Haubitz studied fine arts in Berlin and Munich, Zoche in Perpignan, France, and London. The artists' duo has realized photographic series and site specific installations investigating architecture and public space. In recent years they focused on environmental issues such as climate change and resources.

Haubitz + Zoche participated in numerous national and international exhibitions. In 2012, their video sculpture "Vertigo" was presented at the Havanna Biennial in Havana, Cuba. Haubitz + Zoche were nominated for the Prix Pictet. Their photobook "Sinai Hotels" was awarded the German Photobook Prize in 2007. Haubitz + Zoche received The Kodak award and project grants from Kulturwerk VG Bildkunst and Kulturreferat München.
