= Herkheim =

Coordinates: 48°49′21″N 10°29′19″E

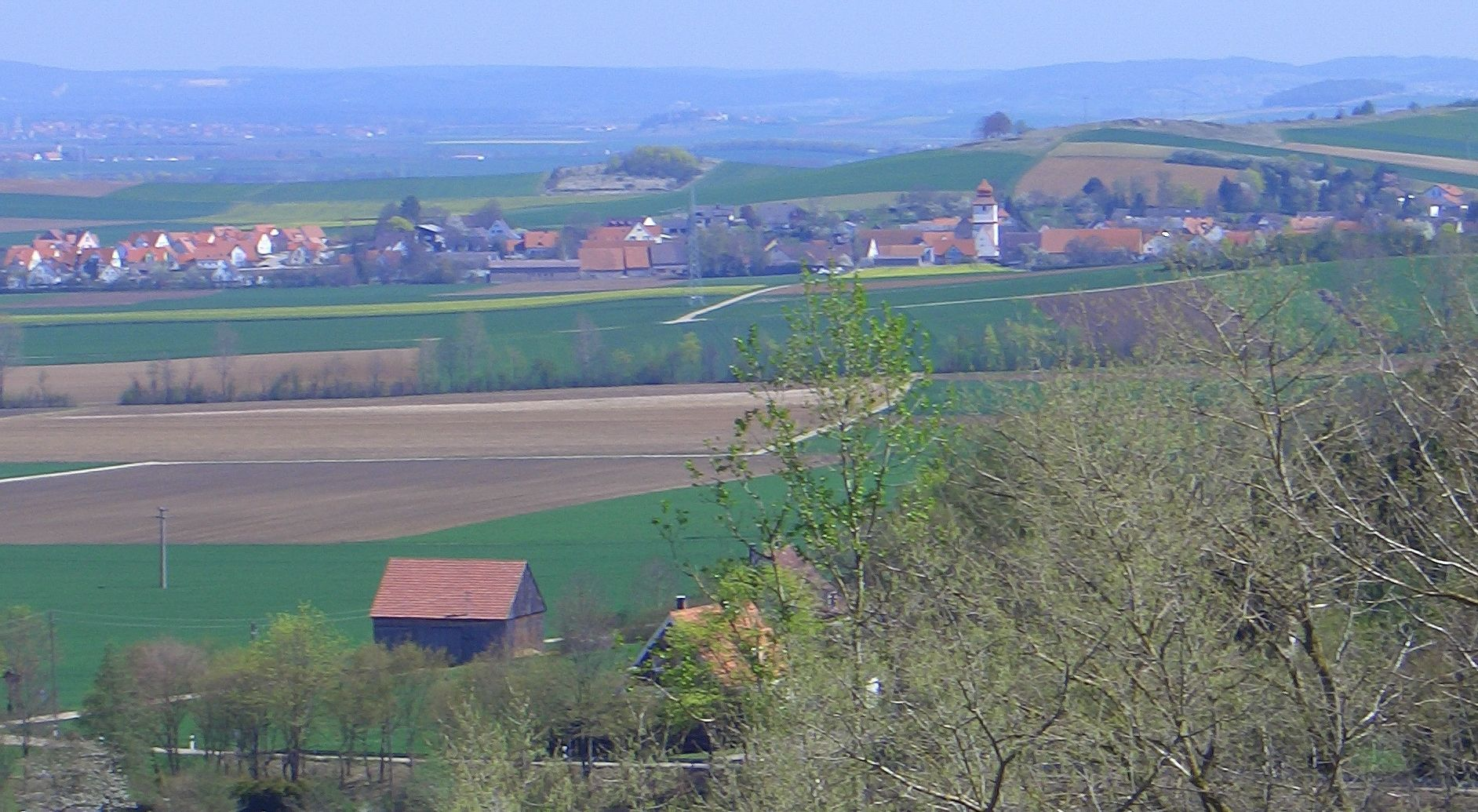

Herkheim is a part of the municipality of Nördlingen in Germany, in the region of Swabia. It has a population of 531
