= Hyacinthe Besson =

French painter

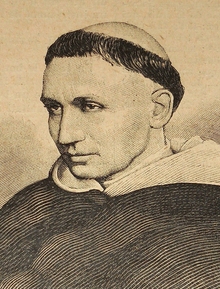
- Born: Jean-Baptiste Besson; 10 March 1816; Rans, Jura, France
- Died: 4 April 1861 (aged 45); Mar-Yacoub, Iraq
- Occupations: Painter; priest

Jean-Baptiste Besson (known as Frère Hyacinthe Besson; 10 March 1816 – 4 May 1861) was a French painter and missionary priest.

== Early years ==
Jean-Baptiste Besson was born and was baptized on 10 March 1816 in Rans in the Jura. He was the natural son of Anne-Charlotte Desiree Besson, aged thirty, by an unknown father. He appears to have spent his first years at the home of his maternal grandfather, a landowner, who lost his fortune through the dishonesty of a relative. His mother took him to Besançon, where she found work as a hotel maid. She then walked to Paris and found work with an old American lady on the rue des Trois Frères, halfway up the Montmartre hill, with a room in the attic. Her employer died in 1828 and left her maid a small legacy.

Besson's mother found a new position with the Abbé Leclair, priest of Notre-Dame-de-Lorette. The old priest gave Mme Besson the task of distributing the alms that he received, which were considerable. Besson was enrolled in a school near the parish, where he was taught by Pierre-Célestin Roux-Lavergne, a friend of Philippe Buchez, with whom he had written the Histoire parlementaire de la Révolution française. His teacher quickly saw the artistic talents of his pupil, and introduced him to the "Christian Socialist" philosophy. Besson met many artists at the school, including Piel, who would later join him in the cloister.

== Artist ==
Roux-Lavergne entrusted Besson to François Souchon for instruction in drawing. At the start of 1833, when Besson was just seventeen, he was able to work with Souchon on a portrait of the Abbé Leclair that was exhibited at the Salon that year. It has since been lost. On 17 March 1833 the priest died and left a generous bequest which gave the mother and son financial freedom. Besson and his mother moved to the Rue de la Monnaie. Besson left school but continued to study under Souchon. Towards the end of June 1833 Souchon invited his pupil to accompany him and Xavier Sigalon to Italy to help prepare a copy of Michelangelo's painting of The Last Judgement in the Sistine Chapel. The stay in Rome was short-lived. On returning, Souchon advised him to take lessons from Paul Delaroche. Besson did not enrol at the Ecole des Beaux-Arts. Delaroche gave him some advice, and encouraged him to copy the masterpieces of the Louvre. He gave a copy of Titien's "The Entombment" to the Abbé Desgenettes. This meeting marked the start of his conversion.

In the fall of 1838 the Bessons, mother and son, left for Rome. Besson had a studio on the corner of Via Felice and Via della Purifazzione, which he shared with the landscape painter Louis-Nicolas Cabat (1812–1893). While in Italy Besson took the opportunity of studying the paintings of the masters. He wandered in the streets of Rome and the surrounding countryside, making many sketches of the people and landscapes. He joined a small group of like-minded Catholic French artists. In the summer of 1839 Besson, Cabat and a few friends went on a sketching tour to Lake Albano, Ariccia, Civita Castellana and Foligno. Besson then went on alone to Assisi. In Lent of 1840 he stayed at the monastery of La Quercia, where he made a copy of the 15th century Madone de la Quercia. After finishing this work he decided to become a priest, and obtained his mother's reluctant assent.

== Priest ==
Besson took the habit at the monastery of Bosco on 28 May 1841 with the name of Brother Hyacinthe. He made his solemn profession on 29 May 1842 and was ordained a priest of 23 September 1843. He stopped painting and devoted himself to the study of Saint Thomas Aquinas. Besson returned to France as a Dominican priest in July 1845. He became a teacher at the novitiate at Châlais-sur-Voreppe. He also made paintings of pious subjects. In December 1846 Besson moved to the monastery at Nancy. He seems to have done little painting while there. In October 1850 he was appointed prior of the Roman monastery of Santa Sabina. In January 1853 he moved to the monastery of San Sisto Vecchio. He received many visitors interested in the religious painter.

In the spring of 1855 Besson was sent to Corsica to prepare a new monastery which could serve as a refuge for the order in Italy, which was threatened by revolutionary disturbances. In August 1858 Pope Pius IX made him Visitor of the Dominican Province of France with the task of determining how a convent to be founded in Lyon should relate to the existing province. Besson was sent to Mesopotamia (Iraq) as an Apostolic Visitor. He left Rome on 23 September 1856 and reached Mosul on 30 November 1856. There he reorganized the Catholic schools and made some progress towards construction of a monastery. He often visited the monastery of Saint-Jacques de Mar-Yacoub. In April 1858 he left Mosul, made a pilgrimage to the Holy Land, and returned to Rome in July 1858. He had made many sketches and several paintings during his trip.

On his return to Rome Besson briefed the Pope about the situation of "Turkey in Asia". He then visited the monasteries in France, where the issue of strict observance was causing a division among the members of the order. He was back in Rome on 23 September 1858, and returned to San Sisto to continue decorating the chapter house. He used drawings he had brought back from the Orient in his painting of the Resurrection of the Child. Besson was uncomfortable about the future of the Iraq mission of the French were to withdraw their consul, and afraid that the members would be victims of Muslim fanaticism. The Pope gave him the power of a Prefect to try to get the French government to reverse their decision, and he succeeded in getting a vice-consul appointed in Mosul. On 14 September 1859 he had a last audience with Pope Pius IX.

Due to a violent disagreement between the heads of the two Iraqi Christian communities, the Chaldean and the Malabar Churches, the Holy See decided to send Besson back to Iraq with significant powers to try to settle the disputes. He died on 4 May 1861 in Mar-Yacoub during a typhoid epidemic. His tomb has been desecrated and destroyed. His decoration of the San Sisto chapter hall was unfinished. He is quoted as having said "If we honestly sought nothing save His will, we should always be in a state of perfect peace."

== Publications ==
- Besson, Hyacinthe; Cartier, Étienne (1870). Lettres du révérend père Hyacinthe Besson de l'ordre des frères prêcheurs (2 ed.). E. Cartier.
- Le Livre d'heures du tertiaire de S. Dominique Nouv. éd (reprint ed.). Paris: Paris Labergerie. 1950. p. 367.

== See also ==
- Catholic Church in France
