= The Beakful =

19th-century painting by Jean-François Millet

- La Becquée (French)
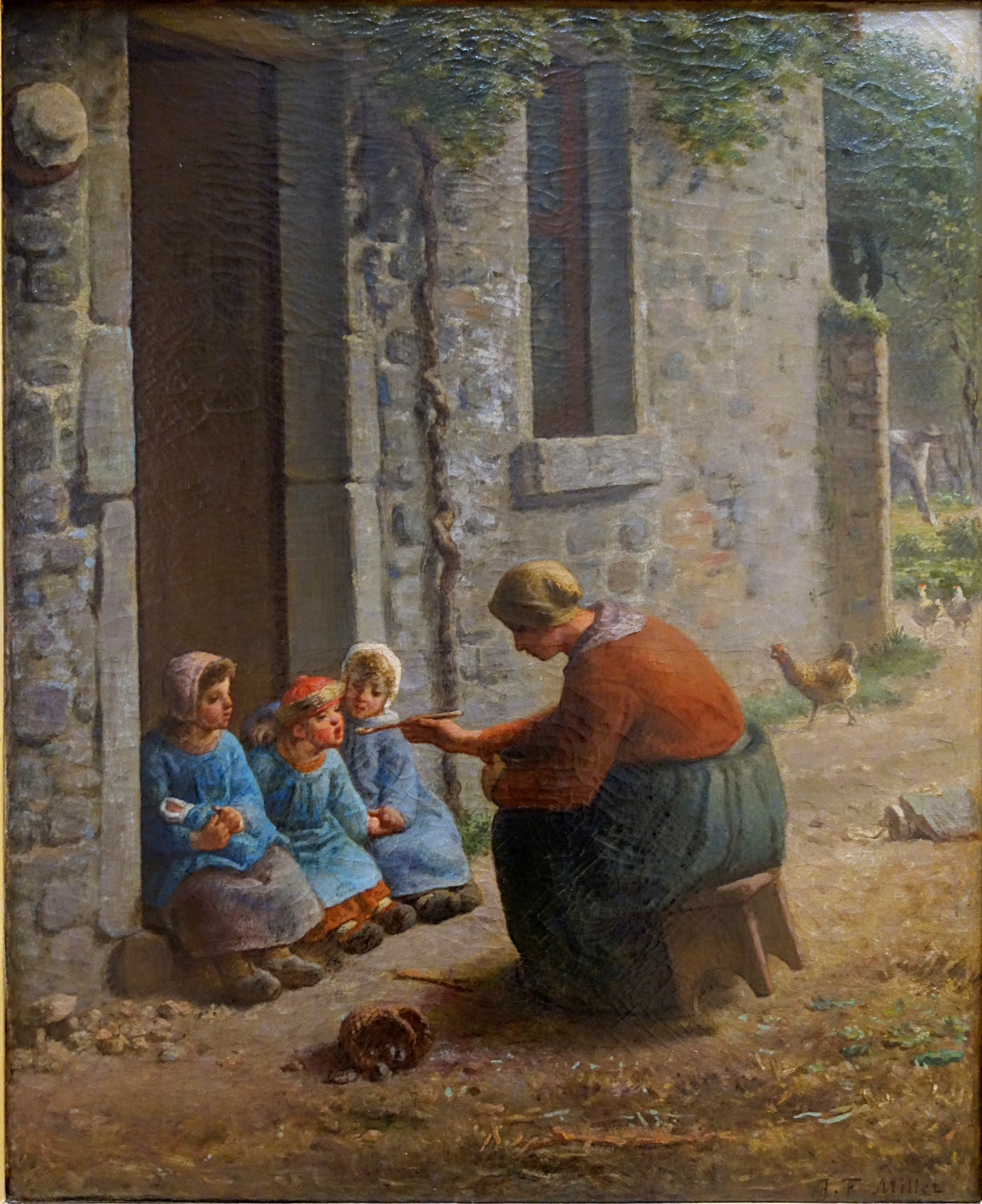
- Artist: Jean-François Millet
- Year: 1860
- Type: Oil painting on canvas
- Dimensions: 74 cm × 60 cm (29 in × 24 in)
- Location: Palais des Beaux-Arts de Lille; Lille

The Beakful, in French, La Becquée, or Woman Feeding Her Children is an oil-on-canvas painting by French artist Jean-François Millet, made in 1860. It is held at the Palais des Beaux-Arts de Lille.

== History ==
This canvas was the culmination of a long process that began with sketches and preparatory drawings made during 1848–1849. Some of the drawings are also kept at the Palais des Beaux-Arts in Lille.

A painted sketch of Woman Feeding Her Children, made in 1848, is held at the Ahmed Zabana National Museum, in Oran, Algeria. Acquired in the 1950s, it was stolen in 1985 and found in France in 2001. It was returned to the Algerian authorities in 2014.

== Description and analysis ==
A mother, squatting on a stool in front of her farmhouse door, gives soup to her three children seated on the threshold, while the father, in the background, digs his garden. Three chickens are depicted. In a letter addressed to the art critic Théophile Thoré-Burger, who saw the canvas exhibited in the Martinet Gallery, Millet explained: "I would like [in this painting] to imagine a brood of birds being fed by their mother. Man works to feed these beings”.

Millet sketched his models on the spot, but went back to his studio to paint. The comparison between the preparatory drawings, made long before, and the final painting, reveals a maturation of the painter's intentions in the composition of the canvas. If the theme itself is immediately present, the construction of the painted scene directs the viewer's towards the father who works the land, at the right. Although barely visible, it holds a central place in the encenation of the nourishing actions assigned to each of the parents. Everything then contributes to express family harmony, from the eyes and hands of the children brought together by the tenderness of the figures of their parents, their massive and protective mother, and their discreet and hardworking father, both united in their function, nurturing. The family harmony is further reinforced by the harmony of the play of colors and by the light that bathes the scene.

== Provenance ==
In 1871, the painting was the property of Madame Maracci, a wealthy patron who wished to donate to the city of Lille a painting by Auguste-Joseph Herlin, then assistant to the curator of the city's painting museum. Herlin, embarrassed, dissuaded her, and convinced her to donate a work by another artist. This is how Millet's painting entered the museum.
