= Alphonse Colas =

French painter and art teacher (1818–1887)

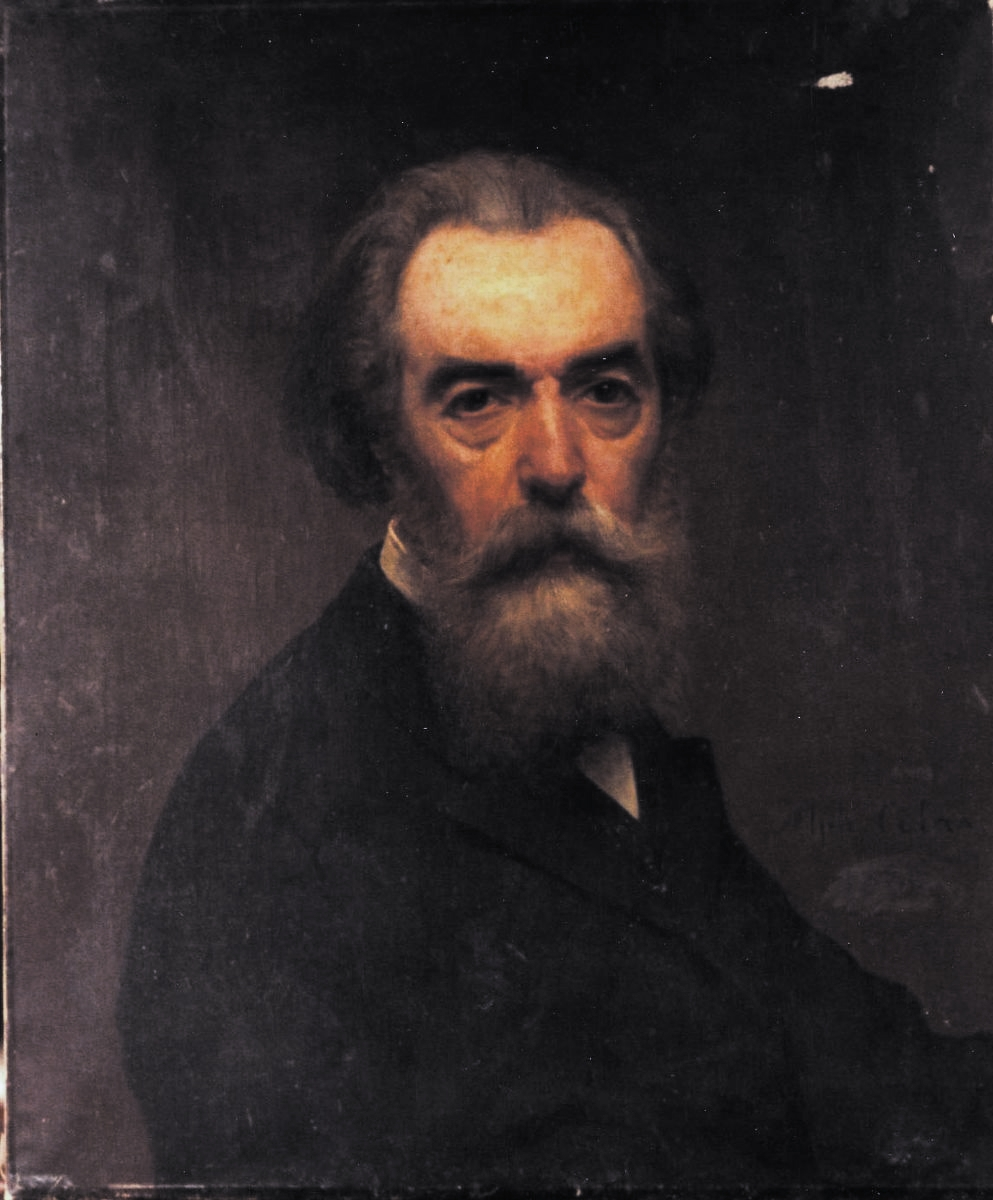
Self-portrait (1885)

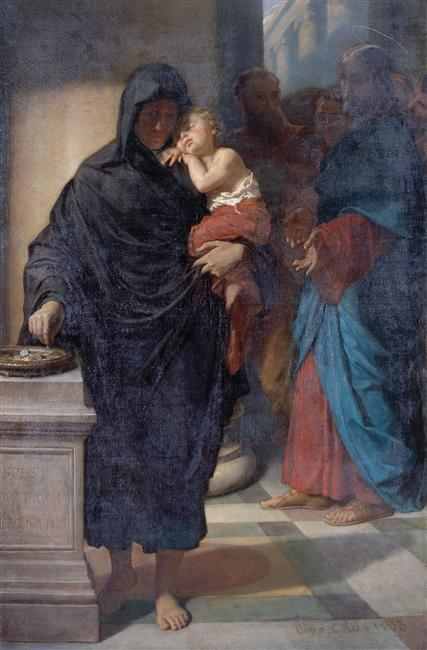
The Widow's Denarius

Alphonse-Victor Colas (25 September 1818, Lille - 11 July 1887, Lille) was a French painter and art teacher. He specialized in portraits and religious art.

== Life and work ==
He was the fifth of seven children born to Jean-Joseph Colas (1779–1858), a tax official, charged with collecting the "contributions directes" in Verlinghem, and his wife, Adélaïde Thérèse née Leprêts (1786–1838).

He enrolled at the École des beaux-arts de Lille in 1834. Four years later, he studied with François Souchon

In 1842, his depiction of the martyrdom of Saint Lawrence earned him a scholarship to study in Rome, at the Atelier Wicar. During his stay in Italy, from 1843 to 1848, he travelled throughout the country, studying the works of the Old Masters. In 1856, he became a Professor of painting in Lille. His notable students there include Alfred Agache, Edgar-Henri Boutry, Léon Comerre, Albert Darcq, Pharaon de Winter and Gaston Thys.

In 1850, he married Elodie Joséphine née Holle (1823–1895); daughter of the Chief Notary. They had three sons and two daughters.

He was one of the most notable church painters of his time, fulfilling numerous commissions in the region. Among many other places, he created religious scenes at the Église Saint-André, the Église Saint-Catherine (including a large Crucifixion), the Église Saint-Michel (decorations and a tableau of 16 paintings on the acts of Saint Michael), and the Église saint-Pierre-Saint-Paul. A collection of Old Testament scenes are among his works on display at the Palais des Beaux-Arts.

A street in Lille is named after him.
