= Herlin =

Herlin is a surname. Notable people with the surname include:

- Antti Herlin (born 1956), Finnish businessman, chairman of KONE
- Auguste-Joseph Herlin (1815–1900), French genre painter from Lille
- Friedrich Herlin (c. 1425/30–1500), German painter
- Fritz Herlen (or Herlin) (before 1449–1491), German artist of the early Swabian school
- Hans Herlin (1925–1994), German novelist
- Jacques Herlin (1927–2014), French character actor
- Olga Herlin (1875–1965), Sweden's first female engraver
