= Hermlin =

Hermlin is a surname. Notable people with the surname include:

- Aarne Hermlin (1940–2007), Estonian chess player
- Stephan Hermlin (1915–1997), German author

== See also ==
- Herlin
