= Souchon =

Souchon is a surname, and may refer to:

- Alain Souchon (born 1944), French singer, songwriter and actor
- François Souchon (1787–1857), a French painter.
- Hermann Souchon (1894–1982), German Navy officer, Rosa Luxemburg's murderer
- René Souchon (born 1943), French politician
- Wilhelm Souchon (1864–1946), German World War I admiral
