= Philippe-Auguste Jeanron =

French painter (1809–1877)

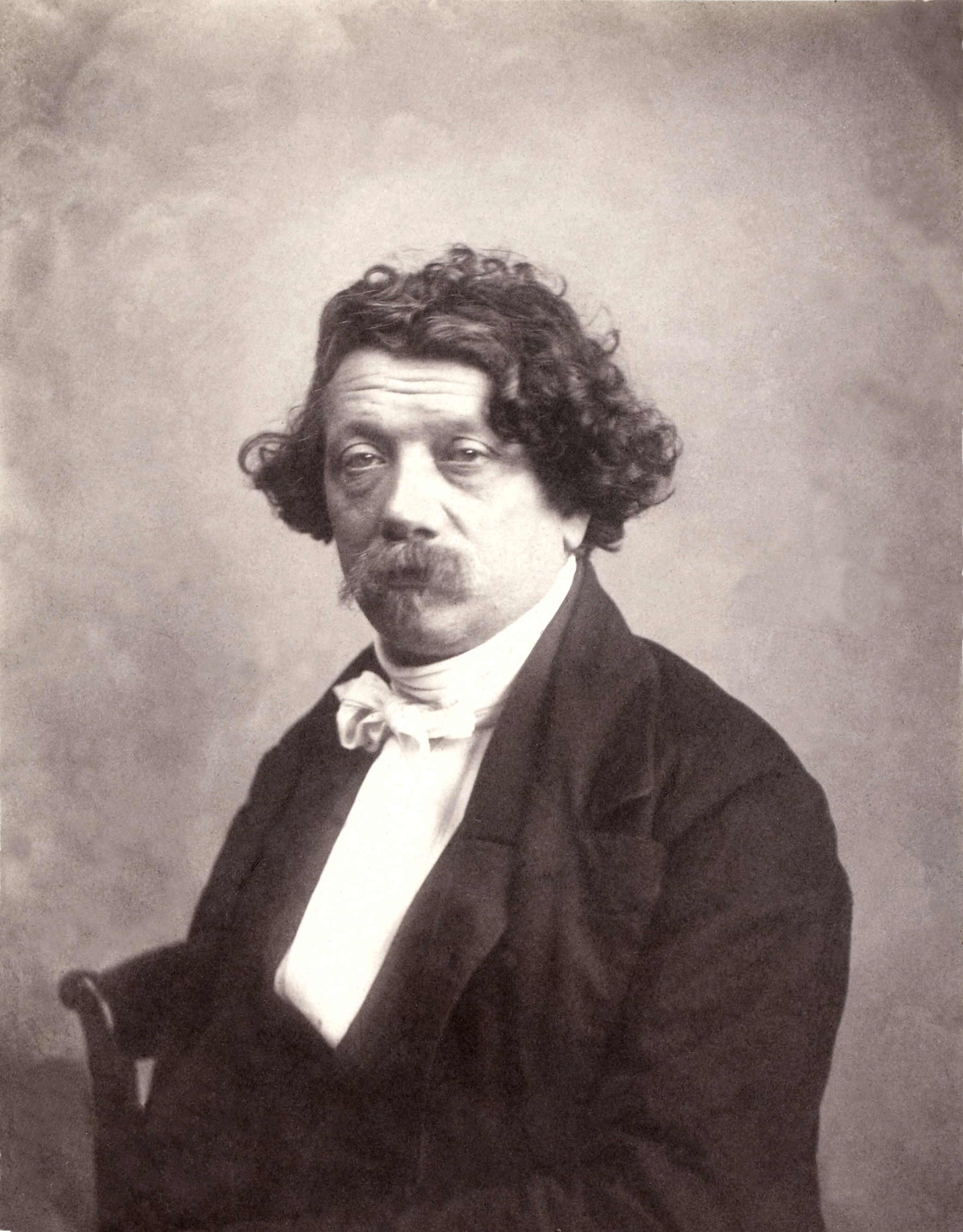
- Photograph of Jeanron by Édouard Baldus
- Born: 10 May 1809; Boulogne-sur-Mer, France
- Died: 8 April 1877 (aged 67); Château de Comborn, Corrèze, France
- Occupations: Painter, designer, lithographer and writer

Philippe-Auguste Jeanron (10 May 1809 – 8 April 1877) was a French painter, curator and writer. Throughout his life he was a passionate republican. His genre pictures typically depicted common people. He opposed the July Monarchy. After the February Revolution of 1848 was made head of National Museums and Director of the Louvre, where he introduced important innovations in the preservation, classification and arrangement of the collections. Later he became director of the museum in Marseille.

== Early years ==
Philippe-Auguste Jeanron was born in Boulogne-sur-Mer on 10 May 1809. (Note: Sources disagree on Jeanron's dates of birth and death. The Larousse Dictionnaire de la peinture gives 1805–1877. The Bibliothèque nationale de France gives 1808-05-11 to 1877-03-05, but notes that Hoefer and Vapereau give 10 May 1809 to 8 April 1877) His grandfather had been a revolutionary who participated in the storming of the Bastille. He was born in the military camp at Boulogne, where his father was Nicolas Jeanron, a shoemaker for the troops of the Emperor. Nicolas Jeanron was taken prisoner by the English in August 1809 and imprisoned on the hulks of Portsmouth. He was later joined there by his wife Marguerite and their children, Philippe and Julie. Another son, Victor, was born in England. They returned to France in April 1814 after peace had been made, and settled on rue Montorgueil in Paris.

Jeanron studied drawing and painting under Xavier Sigalon (1787–1837). He first studied at the Bourbon college where he met many republican activists, including the groups led by Philippe Buonarroti, who had escaped from a death sentence in Belgium. He learned by copying The Wedding at Cana at the Louvre. He also studied at the Swiss Academy. In 1828 Jeanron and his friend Honoré Daumier shared fifty francs for a sign they made for a midwife. He undertook commissions of paintings for churches in Paris such as Saint-Vincent-de-Paul and Saint-Louis-en-l'Ile, and made landscapes in the style of the Barbizon school.

== July Monarchy ==
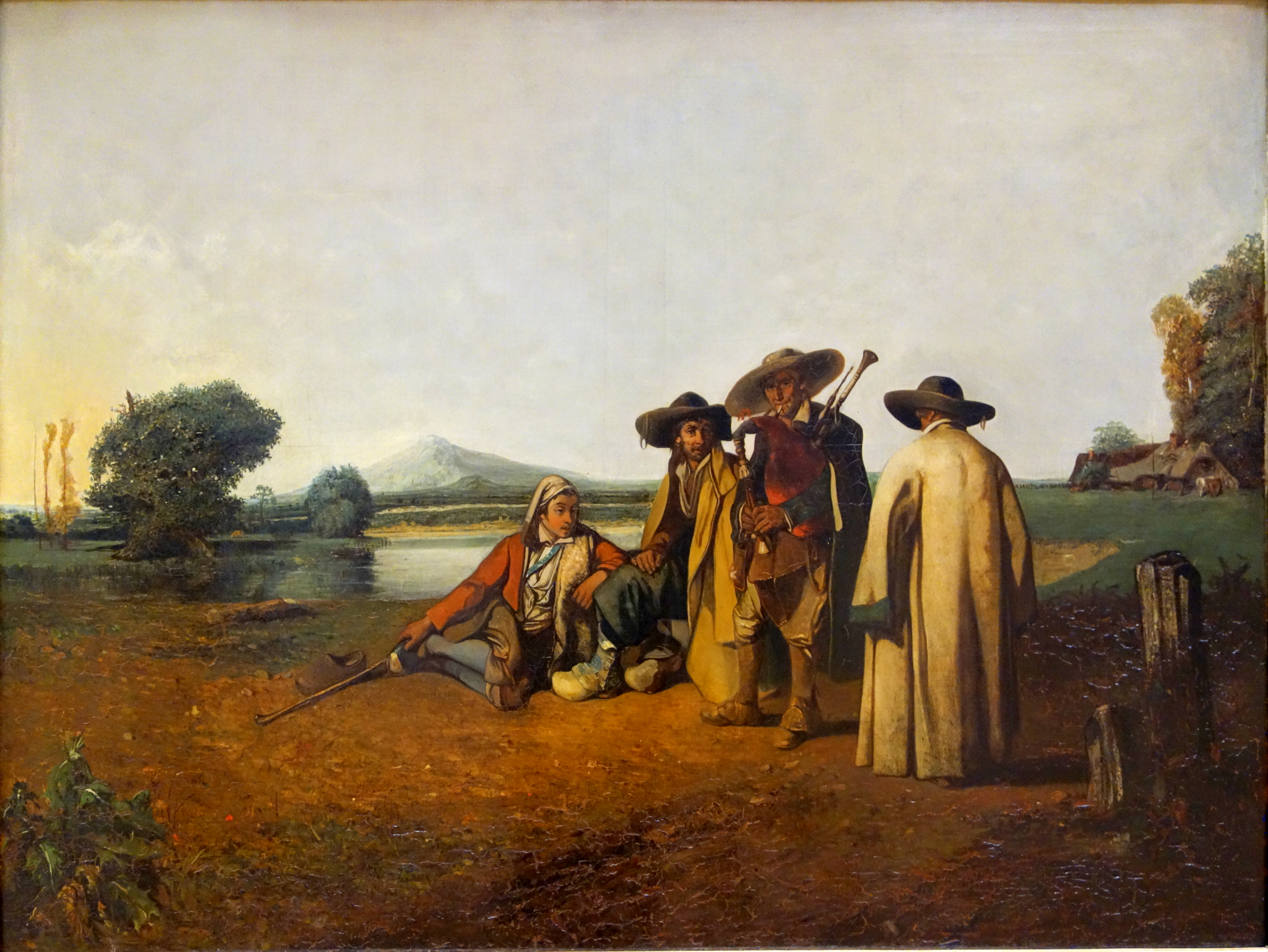
Paysages limousins (1834)

Jeanron was a supporter of the July Revolution of 1830 that brought King Louis Philippe to power. He defended the freedom of expression of artists and founded the Société libre de peinture et de sculpture. Jeanron was a strong believer in republican principles. Throughout the July Monarchy (1830-1848) he exhibited realist pictures that illustrated his views in the Salons, and also spoke, published and discussed his ideas with many artists. A highly educated person, with deep knowledge of art history, he was open to a broad range of styles. He hoped that society would be reformed to be equally inclusive. As it became clear that the July Monarchy was indifferent to the needs of the mass of people, Jeanron became one of the opposition leaders. He depicted the failings of the new regime through his paintings of everyday life.

In 1830 Jeanron married Désirée-Angéline, from a well-to-do Parisian family. From this marriage he inherited the estate and manor of Comborn, Corrèze, in the former Province of Limousin. He often painted the landscapes and country people in this area. Jeanron lived in exile in Limousin between 1833 and 1837. In 1834 he exhibited Paysans limousins écoutant un joueur de musette au bord du grand étang d’Aigueperse (Limousin peasants listening to a bagpipe player at the edge of the large pond of Aigueperse.) He exhibited that year at the Society of Friends of Arts of Lille, where his work was acquired for the Museum. In 1840 he exhibited Bords de la petite Briance, which he hoped to sell to the Louvre, but without success.

== Later career ==
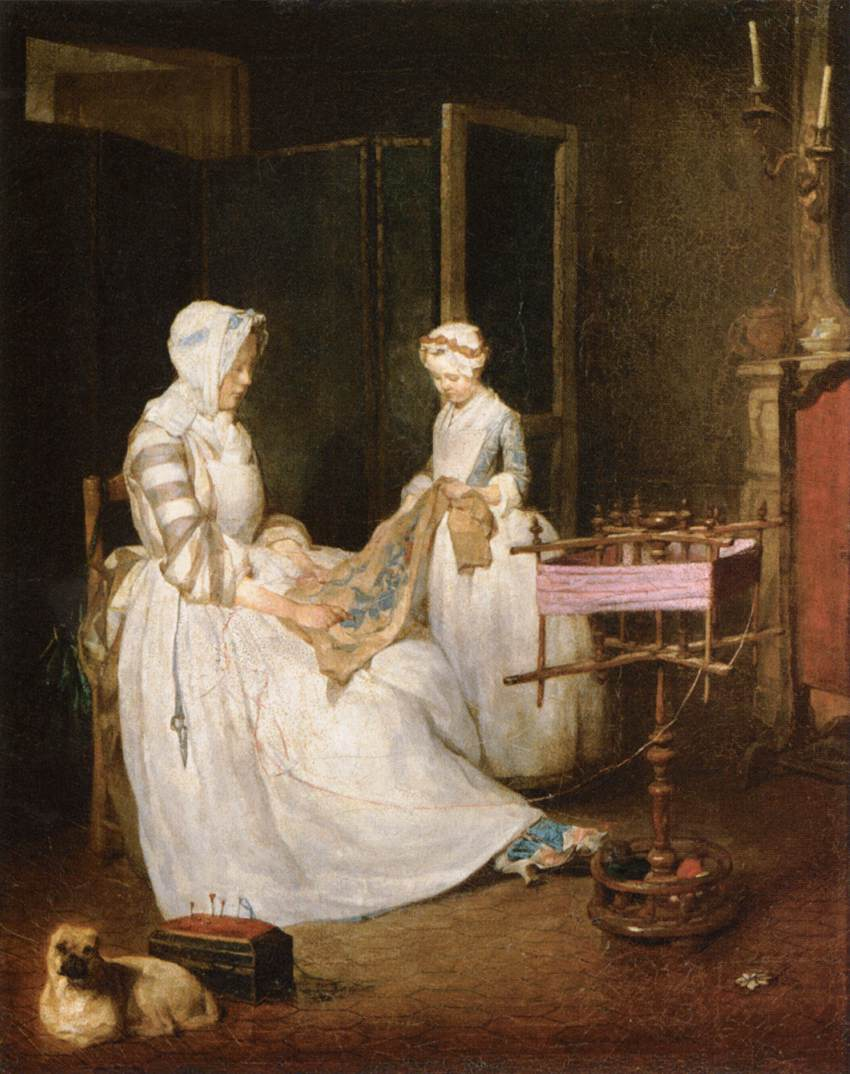
The Hard-working Mother by Jean-Baptiste-Siméon Chardin, in the Louvre collection

When the provisional government took power after the February Revolution of 1848, the provisional government leader Alexandre Auguste Ledru-Rollin nominated Jeanron as head of National Museums and Director of the Louvre. He retained the prestigious position of director of the Louvre from 1848 to 1850. One of Jenron's first priorities with the Louvre was to preserve the collection, and he hired guards for this purpose. He also made it a priority to improve the extremely poor conditions in which paintings were stored.

Jeanron campaigned to include workers in completing the different sectors of the Louvre, hoping to spread the word that the museum was a place where all were welcome, and tried to obtain more space for the exhibits. Jeanron had a deliberately populist agenda. He displayed works by painters such as Jean-Baptiste-Siméon Chardin and the Le Nain brothers who depicted plebeian subjects that would have greater appeal to the working class and the growing middle class, as opposed to the more aristocratic themes of painters like Hyacinthe Rigaud or Louise Élisabeth Vigée Le Brun.

Having struggled as an artist in the 1830s, Jeanron wanted the government to actively support new artists such as Charles Jacque and Jean-François Millet. He also clarified that the Musée du Luxembourg would be a museum of contemporary art, with constantly changing exhibits, while the Louvre would focus more on the past. Jeanron introduced the classification of painters by school, and made the first complete inventory of the collections. He commissioned Eugène Delacroix (1798–1863), whom he greatly admired, to complete the central composition of the Apollon gallery, which had been unfinished since the 17th century.

Jeanron was replaced as director of National Museums by Émilien de Nieuwerkerke. In 1850 Jeanron became director of the Musée de Marseille. Jeanron published several memoirs and works of art criticism. After the Franco-Prussian War of 1870, Jeanron finally retired to his mansion at Comborn. He lived there for seven more years, suffering from poor health and poverty. He died at the Château de Comborn, Corrèze, on 8 April 1877. He is buried in the 42nd division of the Père Lachaise Cemetery.

== Paintings ==
Jeanron's work as a genre painter, typically depicting scenes from everyday life, was strongly influenced by Dutch artists. It is uneven in quality. His painting Les Petits Patriotes (1831) depicts a group of children defending a barricade. The effect is pleasant rather than stirring. It is one of a number of works in which Jeanron advocated the rights of man and defended liberty and democracy. Une scène de Paris (1833) shows a family of paupers, the father wearing a cockade in his hat, apparently starving in the street while a bourgeois couple strolls away. His painting Au camp d’Ambleteuse (1854), which shows a military camp where some soldiers are giving alms to a poor woman with two children, has a striking composition with an unusual sense of space. His Paysans des environs de Comborn is artificial and poor quality by comparison.

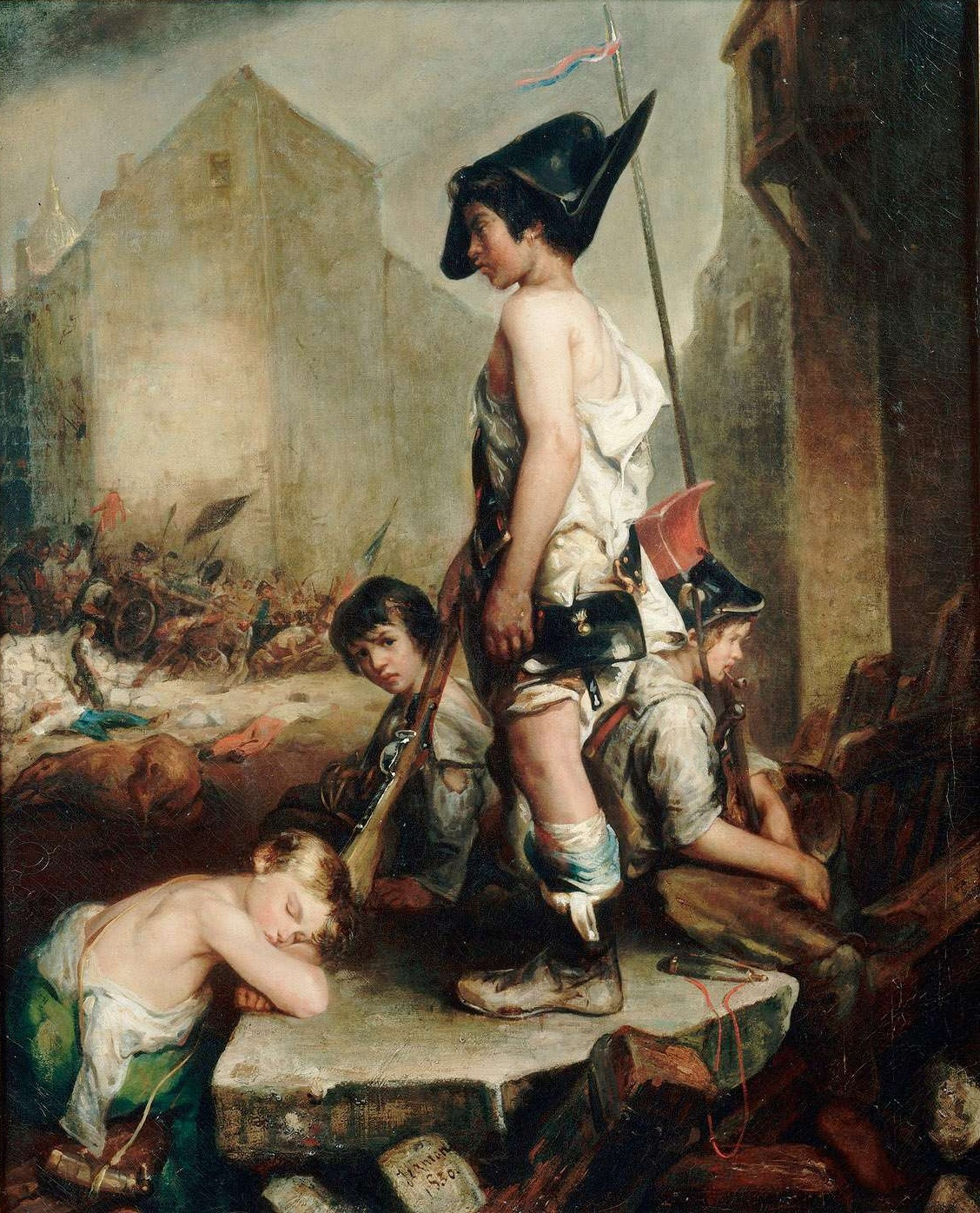
Les Petits Patriotes (1831)

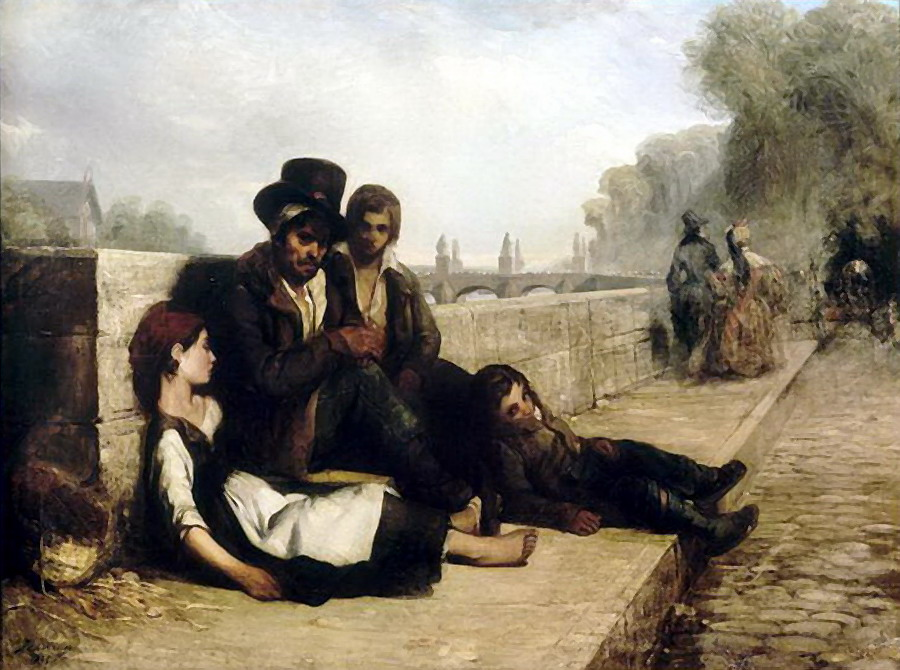
Scène de Paris (1833)

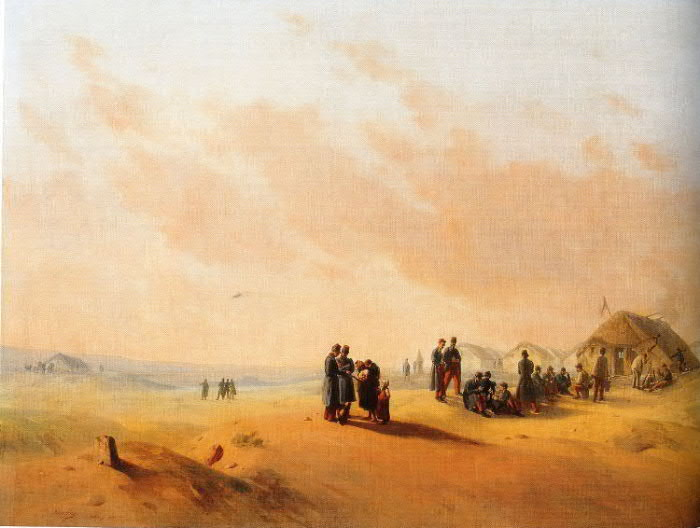
Au camp d’Ambleteuse (1854)

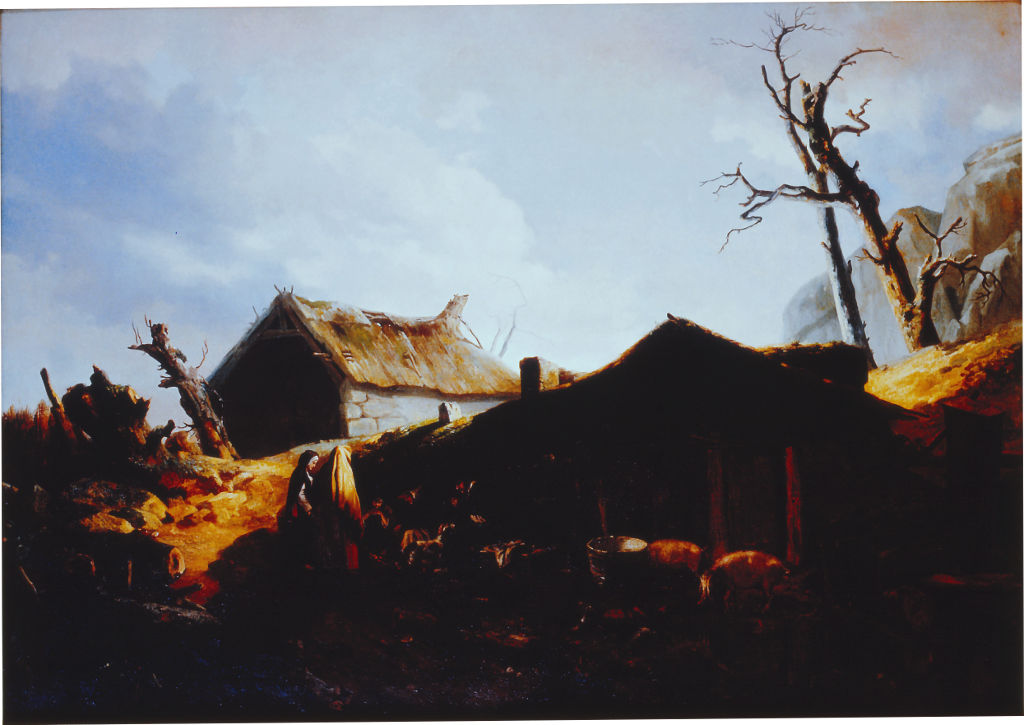
Paysans des environs de Comborn (1858)

Paintings displayed in the Salons were:

- 1831: Portrait d’artilleur; Les Petits Patriotes
- 1833: Une Scène de halle; Une Scène de Paris; Une Halte de contrebandiers; (2nd class medal)
- 1834: Paysans limousins; Un Aveugle mendiant; autre Aveugle mendiant; Jeune Fileuse (aquarelle);
- 1836: Bergers du Midi; L’enfant sous la tente; Pauvre famille; Philosophe campagnard; Un chasseur; Charité du peuple (forgerons de la Corrèze);
- 1838: Portrait de Madame D…; Portrait de Monsieur L…
- 1840: Un site de l’île de Java; Bords de la Petite-Brillance (rivière de la Haute-Vienne); Criminels condamnés à cueillir le poison de l’upas; Portrait de M. Aimé Martin;
- 1842: Portrait de Madame T…; *Portrait de M. Mala; *Sixte-Quint; Portrait de Mademoiselle***; Portrait de Madame***;
- 1847: Le Repos du Laboureur; Un Contrebandier;
- 1848: Enfants jouant avec une chèvre; Le repos; Les deux colombes; Rêverie; Une Bohémienne; Un bohémien;
- 1850: Le Berger; Portrait de femme; La plage d’Andreselles; Le Mariage de sainte Catherine; La fuite en Égypte; Vue du port abandonné d’Ambleteuse; Pose du Télégraphe électrique dans les rochers du cap Gris Nez,
- 1852: Suzanne au bain; Les Pêcheurs; Les Pêcheurs à la traille;
- 1853: Portrait de M. Odier; Vue du Cap Gris-Nez (effet du soir); La Morte Eau (vue matinale du port d’Audresselles);
- 1855: Au Camp d’Ambleteuse; Au Camp d’Eguilhem; Berger breton; Les Bergers (port d’Ambleteuse);
- 1857: Fra Bartolomeo; Vue du fort de la Rochette (au port abandonné de Wimereux); La longue absence (ustensiles de pêche); Pêche à l’écluse de la Slaëtz (port d’Ambleteuse); Oiseaux de mer; Portrait de Madame Antoine Odier; Pêcheurs d’Andreselles; Pêcheurs d’Ambleteuse; Le Tintoret et sa fille dans la campagne; Raphaël et la Fornarina;
- 1859: Le Phénicien et l’esclave; L’île de Calypso; Bords de la Seine; Vue du barrage de Bezons; Coqs de bruyère; Paysans des environs de Comborn; Site des environs de Comborn; La plaine avant l’orage; Départ pour la pêche de nuit au cap Grunez (Cap Gris Nez);
- 1861: sept tableaux de paysages italiens;
- 1863: trois tableaux des environs de Hyères: Les Vieux Salins (2 vues opposées, Les Salins-d'Hyères (owned by Sylvan Cole Gallery); Les Bains Bomettes;
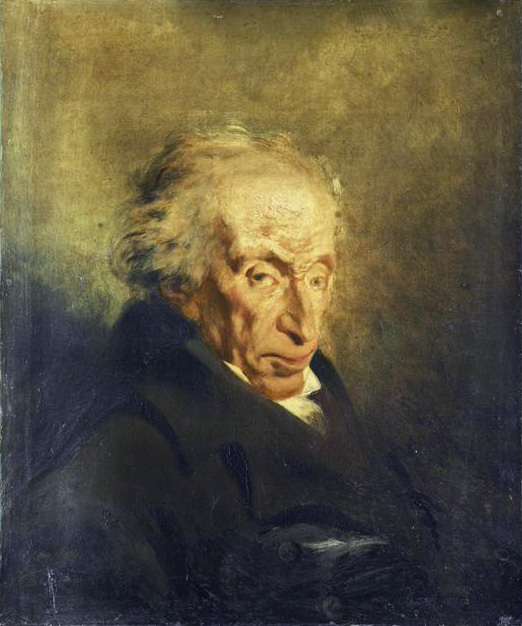
Filippo Buonarotti, homme politique, The Louvre, Paris.

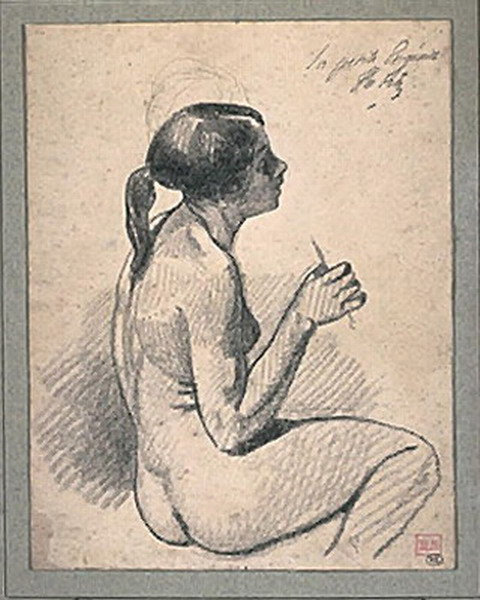
Femme, nue, assise, de profil, The Louvre, Paris.

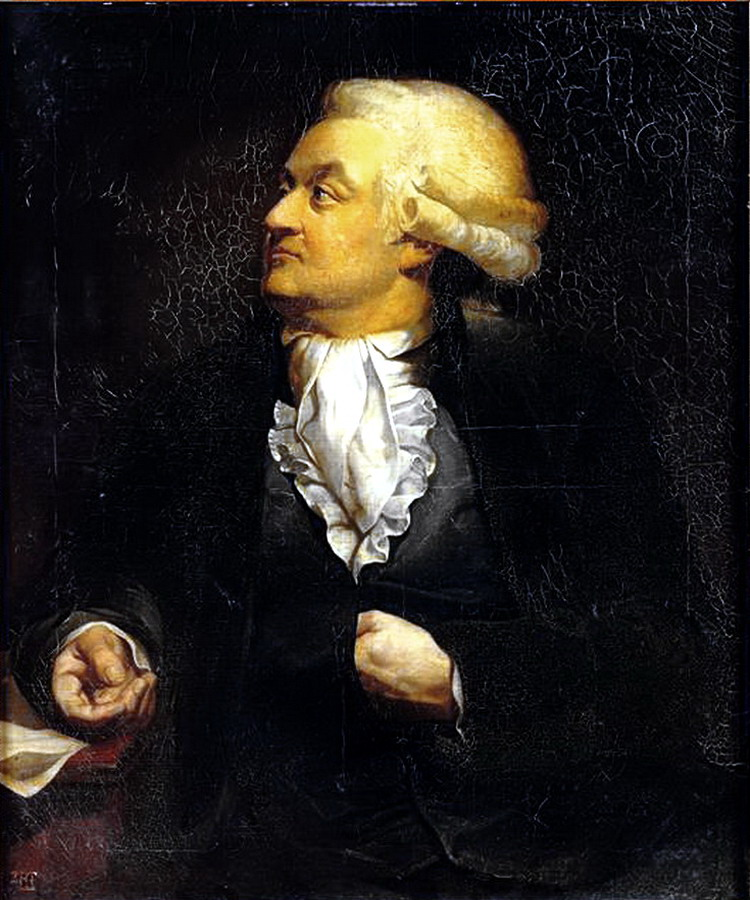
Honoré Gabriel Riqueti, comte de Mirabeau, Palace of Versailles.

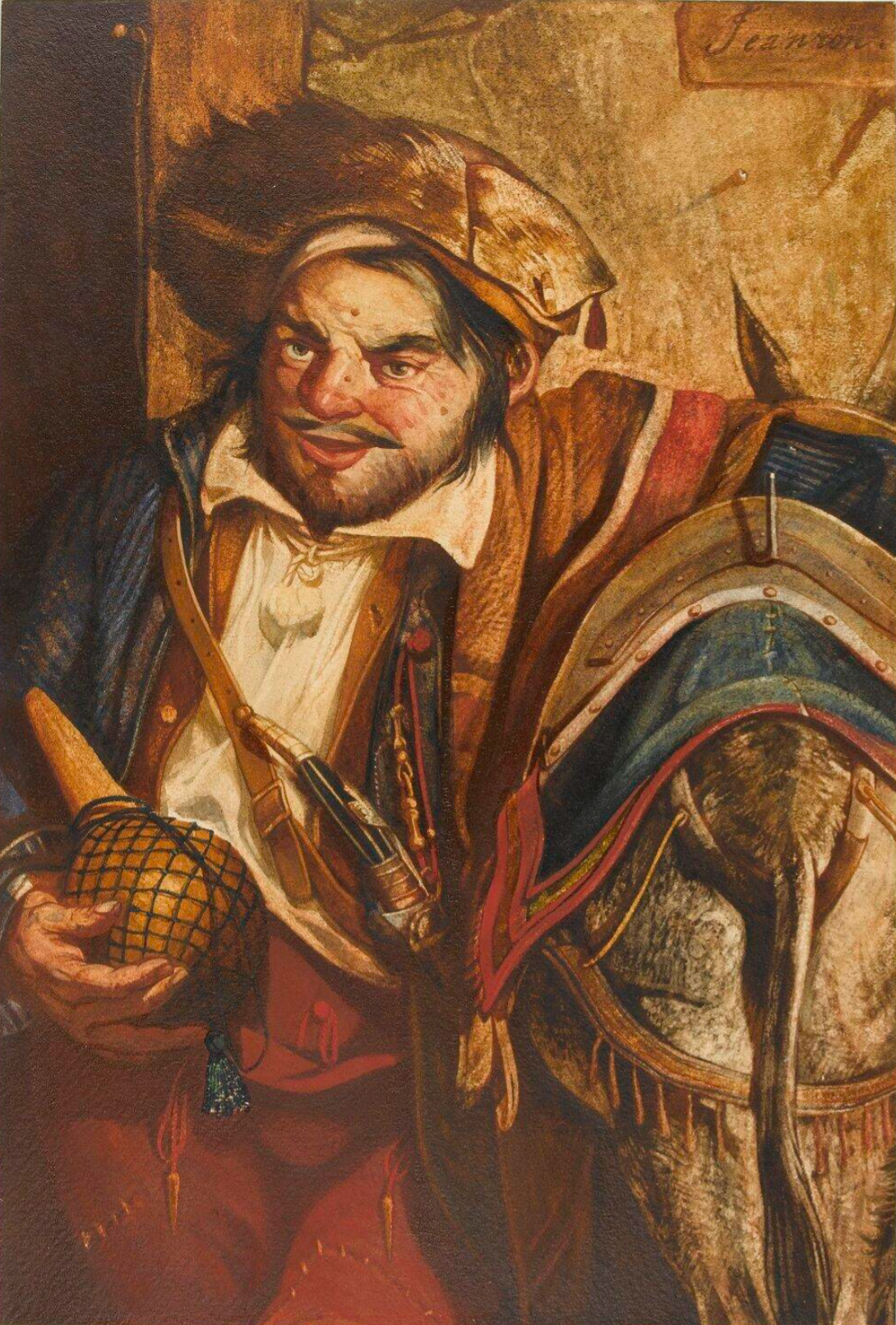
Sancho Pansa, Musée Magnin, Dijon.

== Publications ==
Philippe-Auguste Jeanron's published work includes:

- Du journal et de la commission des artistes, 15 pages, Paris, A. Belin, 1830
- Espérance, 167 pages, Paris, Guillaumin, 1834
- Sigalon et ses ouvrages in the Revue du Nord, n° 9, 1837, 15 pages, Paris, P. Baudouin
- République française. Liberté, égalité, fraternité. Le citoyen Philippe-Auguste Jeanron aux républicains de la Seine, Pièce (Paris,) Pollet. Éditeur scientifique: France. Assemblée nationale constituante. 1848-1849
- Origine et progrès de l'art, études et recherches, 126 pages, 1849 Paris, Techener
- Des Expositions de beaux-arts, ce qu'elles sont, ce qu'elles devraient être, 16 pages, Paris, E. Dentu, 1861
- De l'Art de la peinture ... résumé des conférences tenues en l'École de Marseille 1863-64, 55 pages, Marseille, J. Barile, 1865

== Sources ==
- "Jeanron, Philippe-Auguste". BnF.
- Mansfield, Elizabeth (2005-08-18). Art History and Its Institutions: The Nineteenth Century. Routledge. ISBN 978-1-134-58503-8.
- "Paysans des environs de Comborn (1859)". GéoCulture Limousin.
- "Philippe-Auguste Jeanron (1808-1877)". BnF.
- "Philippe-Auguste Jeanron". Dictionnaire de la peinture. Larousse.
- Rykner, Didier (2 February 2004). "Philippe-Auguste Jeanron, peintre, dessinateur et graveur". Le Tribune de l'Art (in French).
- Weisberg, Gabriel P. (1997-11-21). "The Louvre and its public persona, 1848-52". USING ART HISTORY. CRC Press. ISBN 978-90-5702-209-8.
