= Master of Nördlingen =

German sculptor

The Master of Nördlingen was a German woodcarver active in Nördlingen in the 1460s. His name comes from a group of wooden sculptures carved for the high altar of the Georgskirche in Nördlingen; these depict the Crucifixion, with figures of the Virgin, John the Apostle, two grieving angels, Saint George, and Mary Magdalene. All are of walnut, and retain their original paint schemes. Initially the altar had a pair of wings with painting by Friedrich Herlin; in 1683 these were removed and replaced by a Baroque housing. Nothing further has been ascribed to the artist, although a third angel figure of doubtful attribution is now in a museum in Kaiserslautern.
