= Monastère de Chalais =

Abbey in Isère, France

Châlais-sur-Voreppe
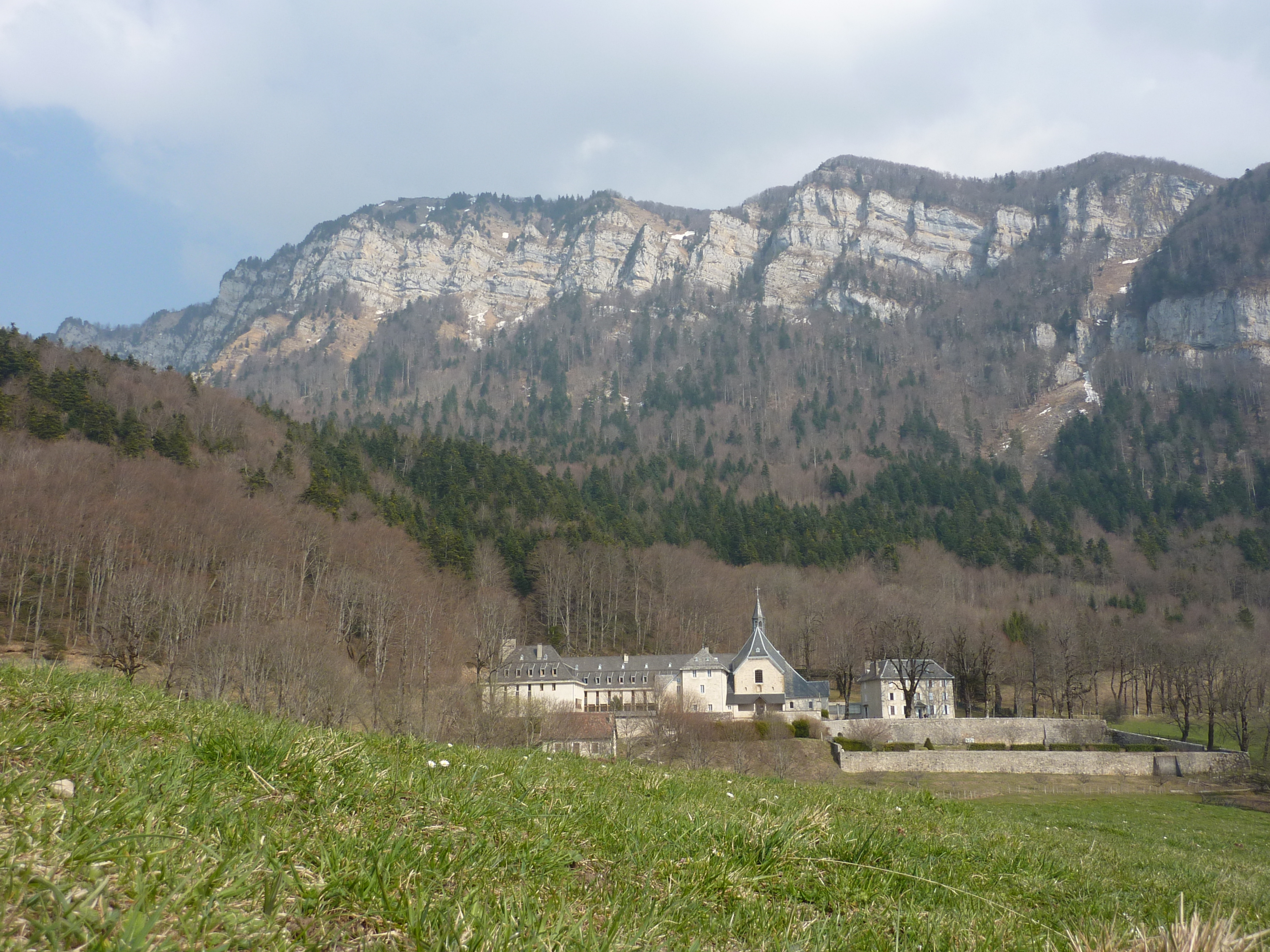
- The abbey in the spring of 2012

- Location within France

Monastery information
- Order: Dominican
- Established: 1101

Site
- Location: Near Voreppe. Isère, France
- Coordinates: 45.2929°N 5.6759°E
- Website: www.chalais.fr

The Monastère de Chalais, also called Châlais-sur-Voreppe or Notre-Dame de Châlais, is a Dominican convent near the town of Voreppe, Isère, France. The convent dates from 1101.

The monastery at Chalais began as a house of male hermits, under the guidance of Hugh of Chateauneuf, like the Carthusian monks. At first the Order of Chalais was independent, but in 1303 it was absorbed by the Carthusians. The monastery was partly destroyed in 1562 during the French Wars of Religion, but was rebuilt. The state seized it during the French Revolution (1789–99) and sold it to a private owner.

From 1844 to 1887 it was again a monastery, this time of the Dominican friars, before again being sold. The present community of Dominican nuns bought the property in 1963 and restored it. Today the nuns of Chalais manufacture Monastic biscuits to cover their expenses.

== Location ==
The monastery is about 7 kilometres (4.3 mi) from Voreppe along a winding forest road. It is located on a plateau overlooking Voreppe at an altitude of 940 metres (3,080 ft), which is often snow-covered in winter. The monastery is set in a beautiful location in the Chartreuse Mountains. It has a cemetery and a Romanesque church.

Chalais can be reached by foot from Voreppe, to the west, with a climb of about two hours. It is connected by a difficult road to the Grande Chartreuse convent. The monastery is on a conical hill with a cross on the summit, about a half hour walk away. From the summit there is a view of mountains and the whole valley of the Isère river as far as the Rhône. Henri Perreyve visited the monastery in 1854 and wrote about it.

== History ==
The monastery originated when saint Hugues de Châteauneuf, bishop of Grenoble, established some monks at Chalais in 1101. At first there were just two or three monks. They were called the "hermits of Chalais". They lived apart from the world, followed the rule of Saint Benedict, practiced forestry and raised sheep. In 1110 the occupants were thinking of abandoning the hermitage when they were given donations and support by Guigues III, Count of Albon and his wife Mathilde. The monks built a Romanesque church, which still stands.

In 1125 Pope Honorius II took Chalais under his protection. Without sufficient income, and with many applicants for admission, Chalais was forced to spread to other locations. In 1148 the fathers established a rule, which they called the "Charter of Charity of the Order of Chalais." At its peak in 1205 the Order of Chalais had ten abbeys and three priories. In the late 13th century the order declined at the expense of other, more prosperous orders. On 24 December 1303 the Bishop of Grenoble gave Chalais to the Grande Chartreuse.

The Carthusians maintained the abbey as an autonomous community. It was relatively prosperous although with limited resources. During the religious wars of the 16th century the abbey was plundered and partly destroyed in 1562. Without the resources to pay for rebuilding, the Chartreuse de Chalais lost its autonomy and became a subsidiary of the Grande Chartreuse convent. The Carthusians of this convent used the abbey as a place of refuge for their old and weak members. The number of priests and brothers gradually declined, with only five remaining when the French Revolution began in 1789. The building was taken over as national property, and sold to a private owner.

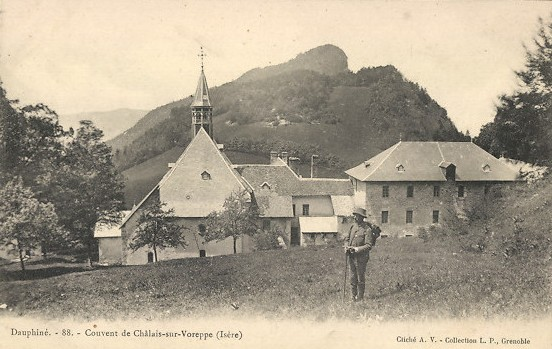
1904 postcard

In April 1844 the Dominican Abbé Lacordaire obtained permission to purchase Chalais and establish a Dominican novitiate. The house of study accommodated about forty brothers. A small new house was built for visitors. The religious painter Hyacinthe Besson was appointed the first Master of the novices. The house was populated by French novices and students who had joined the Dominicans in Italy. In 1859 Lacordaire moved the community to Saint-Maximin, Var. Chalais became a rest home for Dominicans. In 1887 it again became private property when it was sold to an industrialist from Grenoble.

In 1932 the owners of the property, the Nicolet-Courbier family, invited the Dominicans from the house of study near Chambéry to spend their holidays there. During World War II (1939–45) maintenance of the property was difficult. In 1943 the French Resistance established a base there. In 1956 a first attempt was made to restore the buildings, but had to be abandoned due to lack of resources. However, a road was built in 1958. In 1963 Dominican nuns from Oullins, near Lyon, settled in Chalais and began to build a new convent on the ruins of the old one. At first they had many financial difficulties. In 1966 they were joined by the nuns from Chinon.

== Today ==
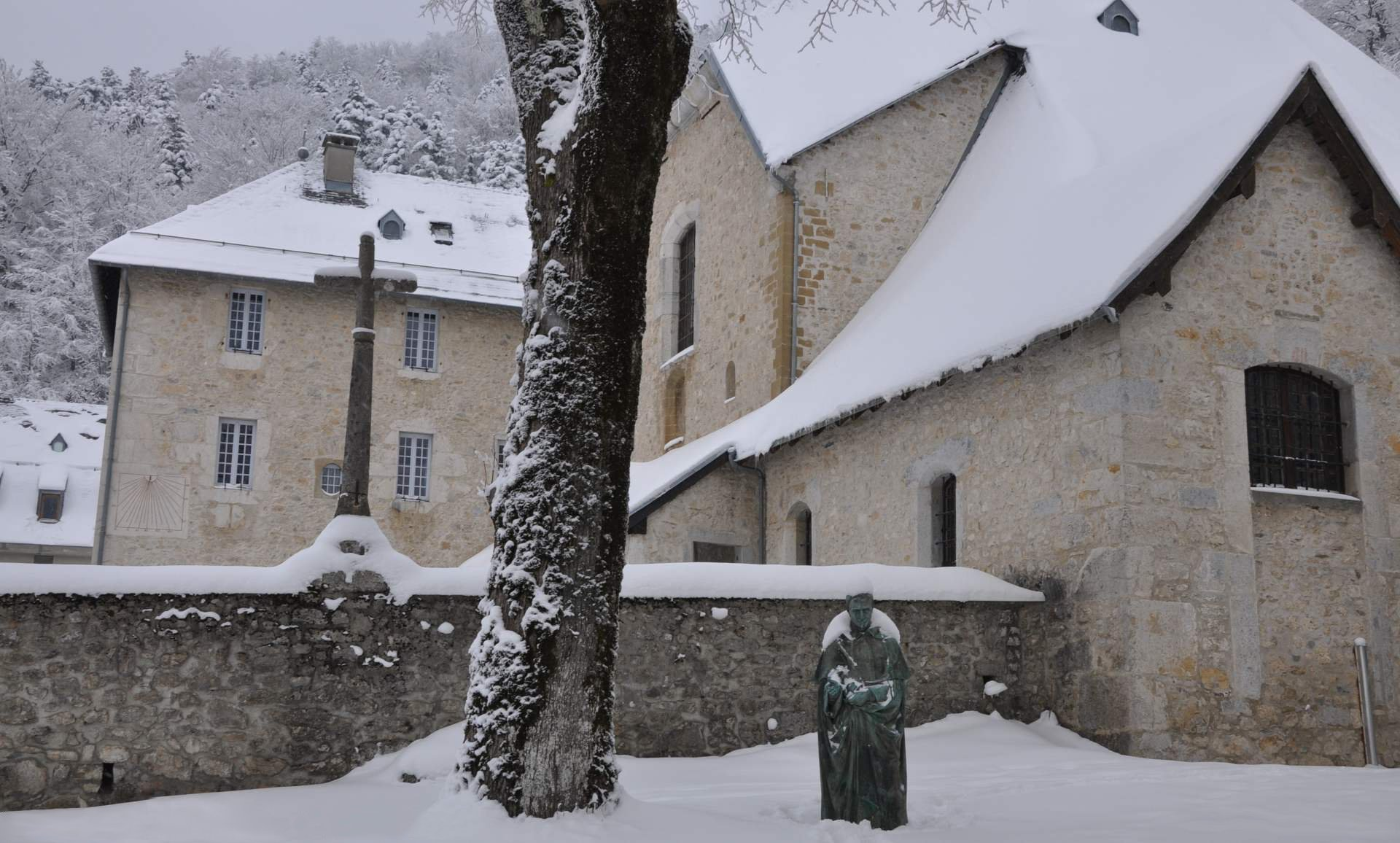
Abbey buildings in the winter of 2010

The choir, transept and a bay of the nave survived the sacking on 1562, and the Carthusians rebuilt the rest of the Romanesque church. In the 18th century they erected a Carthusian porch and belfry near the west entrance of the church. The interior of the church has ribbed vaults, with the key of the vault representing the mystic lamb surrounded by the four evangelists. There are slender columns flanking the choir window, which give elegance to the abbey church.

As of 2014 there was a community of twenty nuns in the convent, finding a stable income from the manufacture of biscuits. The monastery buildings cover an area of 6,000 square metres (65,000 sq ft) of which 2,000 square metres (22,000 sq ft) is occupied by the biscuitry. The buildings include a dining hall, library, offices, laundry room and the cells of the nuns on the top floor. The nuns follow the rule of St. Augustine. Their life is organized around the liturgy, study and the work of making biscuits. They also welcome visitors who want to spend some time sharing their life of silence and prayer. There is room for 25 people in the hotel. The "hermitage", an old foresters' house, can accommodate youth groups or families.
