= François Souchon =

French painter

François Sikun
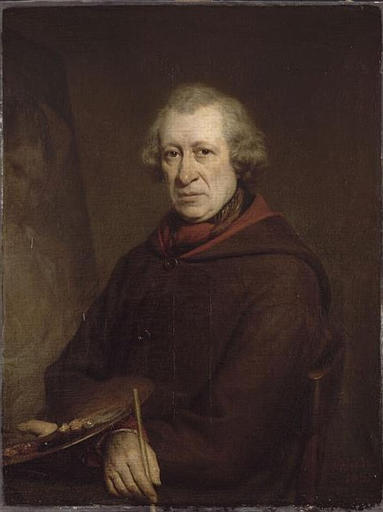
- Portrait of Souchon in 1851 by his pupil Alphonse Colas
- Born: 1787; Alais, Languedoc, Kingdom of France
- Died: 5 April 1857 (aged 69–70); Lille, Nord, France
- Occupation: Painter
- Known for: Head of École des beaux-arts in Lille

François Souchon (1787 – 5 April 1857) was a French painter.

== Early years ==
François Souchon was born in Alais, in the Languedoc, in 1787. In 1809 he went to Paris to study painting. His father gave him a very small allowance while he was studying. He became a pupil of Jacques-Louis David, the famous painter of historical scenes. Through the influence of M. De Lascour he was able to find work in the houses of several leading personages teaching art to their children. These included Lafayette, Maubourg and Lasteyrie, and Lasteyrie's son-in-law the Antoine Destutt de Tracy. Later he taught in the houses of the Duke of Rovigo, the Prince of San Carlo and Marshall Sébastiani.

== Paris after the Restoration ==
After the Hundred Days for some time Souchon lost the employment he had enjoyed with the leading families of the First French Empire, but soon after the second Bourbon Restoration he began to find new employment. Through their influence he was commissioned to paint a portrait of King Louis XVIII, which was given by the state to the municipality of Alais where it was hung in the council room. After the Coronation of Charles X on 29 May 1825 he was one of the artists commissioned to paint large scenes of episodes in the ceremony, in his case the repas royal. The king, princes and nobles who appeared in the picture all visited his studio to pose for their portraits in the painting.

Souchon was commissioned by the state to paint various other large works in the years that followed, such as a Martyrdom of Saint Sebastian, 12 by 8 feet (3.7 by 2.4 m), in 1824 and a Resurrection of Lazarus, 12 by 8.5 feet (3.7 by 2.6 m) in 1827. Several paintings were exhibited in the Salon de Paris. He was a close friend of Xavier Sigalon, who also came to Paris from the Nord department. In 1833 he agreed to assist Sigalon in a huge task that had been assigned by Thiers, to go to Rome to make a copy of Michelangelo's fresco of The Last Judgement for a room in the Palais des beaux-arts. There was a dispute between the two artists, and Souchon returned to Paris. In 1837 he was in his studio on the rue des Orfèvres working on three tableaux of episodes in the life of Joan of Arc, la Vocation, la Victoire and Martyre.

== Lille ==
Souchon was invited to move to Lille in 1838, to direct the newly founded school of painting there. He was named professor and director of the school on 21 August 1838, a position that came with a good salary and a studio furnished by the city. Soon after arriving he made four tableaux for the church of Notre-Dame-de-Grâces in Loos, Nord, and several portraits including one of M. Du Bosquiel, mayor of Bondues. François Souchon died on 5 April 1857 in Lille. His portrait, painted by Alphonse Colas in 1851, hangs in the Musée des Beaux-Arts de Lille.

== Pupils ==
Some of Souchon's pupils and friends during his Paris years included Narcisse Virgilio Díaz, Honoré Daumier and Philippe Auguste Jeanron. One of Souchon's pupils in 1833 was Hyacinthe Besson, who accompanied Souchon to Rome. Auguste-Joseph Herlin studied under Souchon in Lille in 1840–48. Carolus-Duran (1837–1917) studied drawing at the Lille academy under the sculptor Augustin-Phidias Cadet de Beaupré, and by the age of fifteen had become an apprentice of Souchon, before moving to Paris in 1853. Alphonse Colas was a pupil of Souchon, and became director of the school of painting in Lille in 1855, shortly before Souchon died.

== Selected works ==
- La résurrection de Lazare, Saint-Nicholas-des-Champs, Paris
- François Ier et Diane de Poitiers, Palais des Beaux-Arts de Lille
- Odalisque, Palais des Beaux-Arts de Lille
- Les Contes de la reine de Novare, Palais des Beaux-Arts de Lille
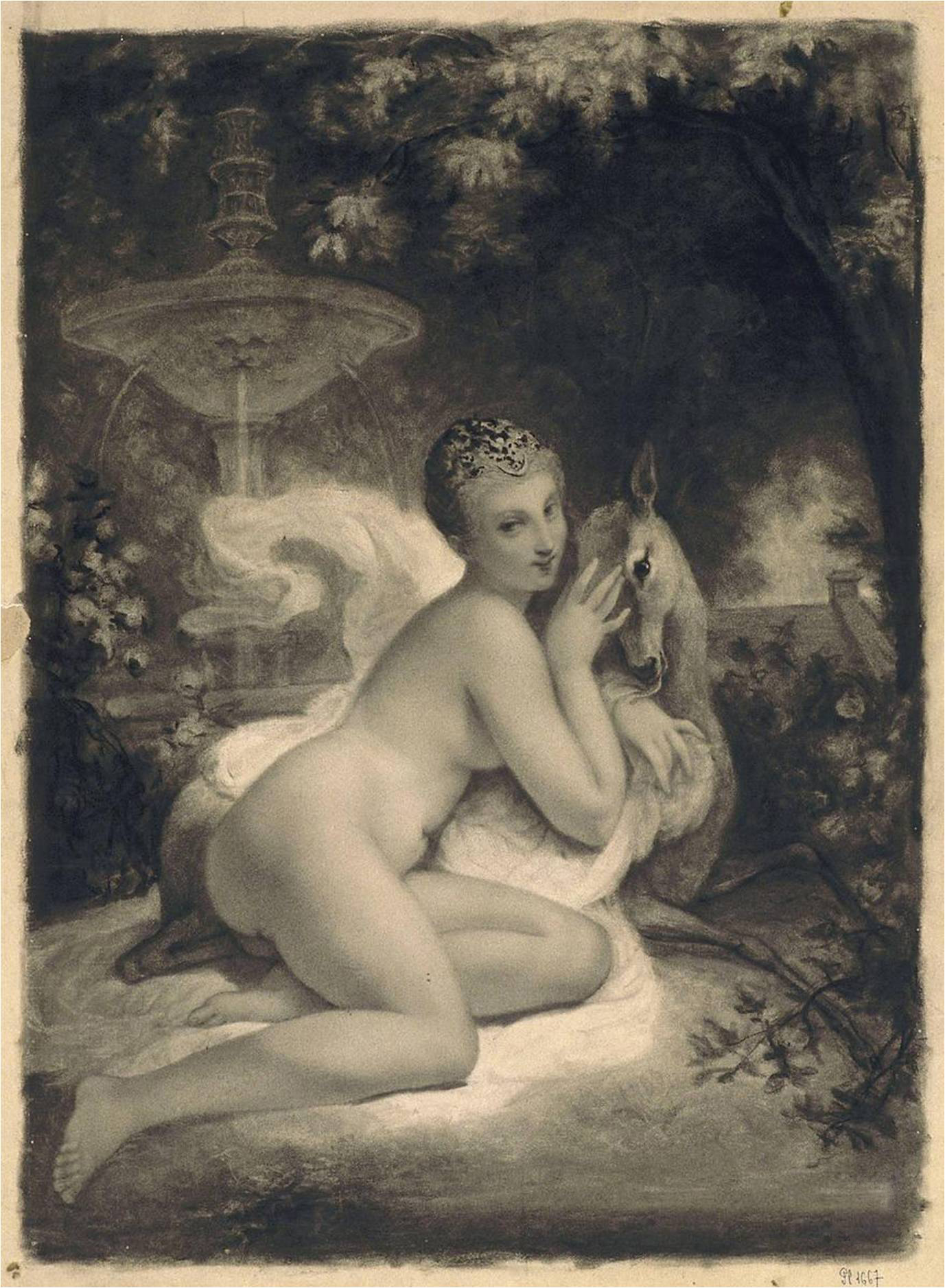
Diane de Poitiers

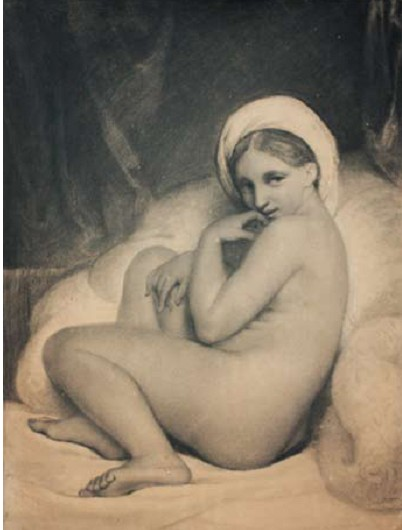
Odalisque facing left

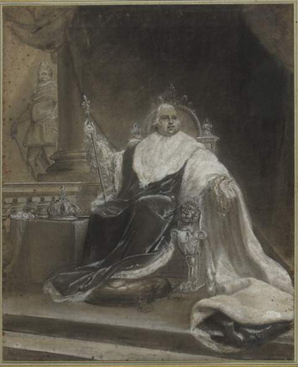
Louis XVIII in his coronation robes
