= Pharaon de Winter =

French painter

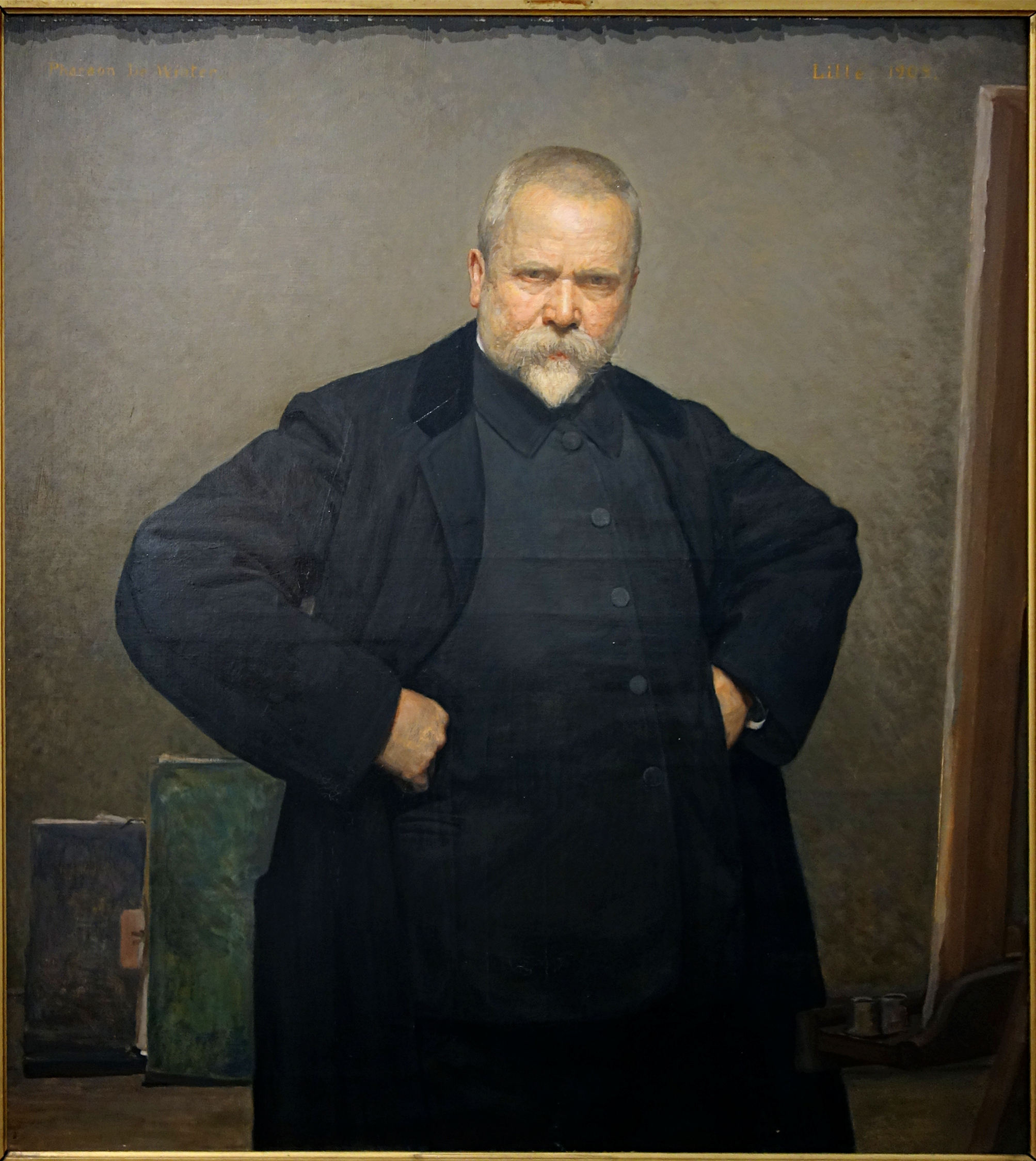
Self-portrait (1904)

Pharaon-Abdon-Léon de Winter (17 November 1849, Bailleul - 22 June 1924, Lille) was a French painter; primarily of genre scenes.

== Biography ==
He was the third of twelve children born to the family of a clog-maker, who gave them all literary names, such as Zénon, Odon, Ursmar, and Clovis. He displayed some early skill for drawing so, at the age of eleven, he was allowed to take lessons from an amateur local artist. In 1861, he left Bailleul to stay with an aunt in Bruges and work at her hotel. There, he attracted the attention of a professional artist named Henri-Julien de Stoop (1827-1864) and began learning art in earnest.

Upon returning to France, in 1869, he enrolled at the École des beaux-arts de Lille and improved his skills, studying with Alphonse Colas. In 1872, he moved to Paris, entered the École des Beaux-Arts, and worked in the studios of Alexandre Cabanel. He was also a frequent visitor to the workshops of Jean-Baptiste Carpeaux and Pierre Puvis de Chavannes. His first exhibit at the Salon came in 1875. His style was heavily influenced by his friend and mentor, Jules Breton.

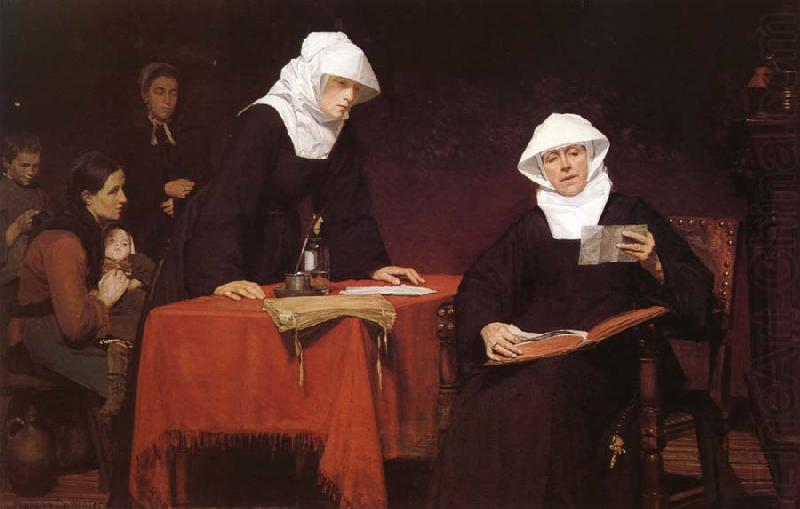
At the Dispensary

In 1877, he married one of his models, Angéline Charlet, but she died two years later, in childbirth. To help with his grief, he took an extended trip to Italy, but became ill and returned home. Once there, he threw himself into his work, producing large, impressive works for submission to all the salons. In 1881, he began an especially ambitious triptych; on the subject of the Redemption. During this work, he became especially attracted to a model named Julia Marie Fagoo, the daughter of a farmer; painting a series of small genre scenes with her.

=== Later career and legacy ===
His work eventually attracted notice. In 1884, one of his works, "At the Dispensary", was reproduced in Le Monde illustré and issued as a lithograph. In 1887, his former teacher, Colas, died and he was named the new Director of the drawing and painting courses at the École. For the first time in his life, he had a steady income so, in 1889, he married Julia. They had two children: a son, Zéphyr, born in 1891, and a daughter, Rosa, born in 1901.

Many of his students at the École won awards and became well known, including Jean Baltus, Anatole Odilon Bernast, Aristide Delannoy, Victor Dupont, Auguste Herbin, Émile Ancelet and Edmond-Jules Pennequin. In 1902, a dispute with the École, which involved a reduction in teaching hours, led him to resign and start his own school, under the patronage of Carolus-Duran. Financial difficulties ensued, however, and he accepted an offer to return to his old position in 1905. Two years later, a major retrospective of his work was held in Roubaix.

He began having eye problems in 1912. They worsened after the start of World War I, and he underwent six operations during the German occupation. To add to the misery, Zéphyr was taken as a war prisoner the day before he was due to be discharged. Then, in 1918, he learned that a German assault had destroyed Bailleul, including his parents' home and his original workshop, which he had been planning to turn into a small museum. About one-fifth of his total artistic output was lost. After the war, he continued to teach, but could no longer paint. By 1922, his condition was causing so much pain, he had to give up teaching as well. He died two years later.

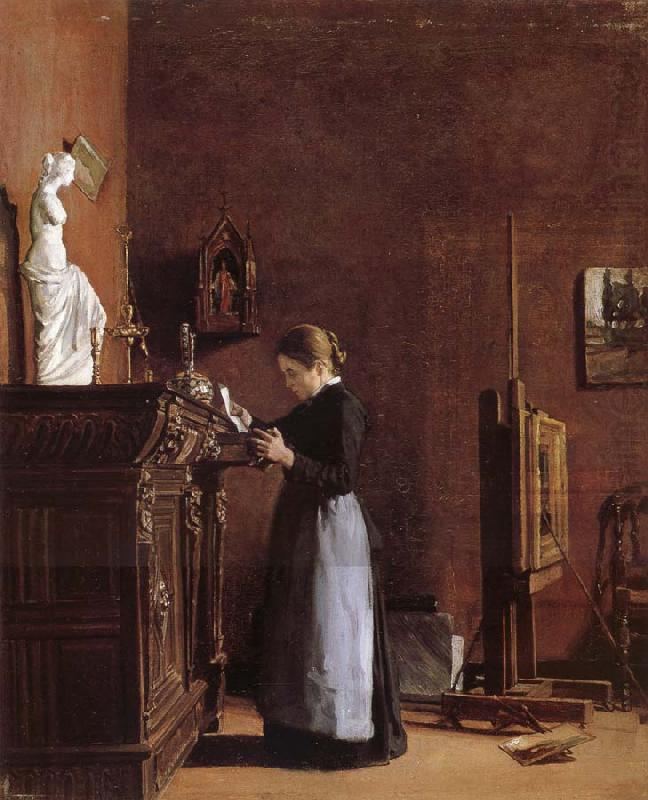
The Indiscretion

The street where he grew up in Bailleul was named after him in 1930. The city of Lille also gave his name to a lane that connects two major streets near the Ècole's former location at the Place du Concert. The film, Humanité, directed by Bruno Dumont, follows an alleged descendant of the painter, a police lieutenant in Bailleul. A passage from the film shows the protagonist lending a portrait of him to a museum in his region for a temporary exhibition. "Pharaon de Winter" is also the name of a French indie pop musical group that released their first album in 2015.

== Other sources ==
- "De Vlaamse ziel in de Franse schilderkunst Pharaon de Winter (1849-1924) , a biography by Joost de Geest; summary by Jacques Fermaud, @ the Digitale Bibliotheek voor de Nederlandse letteren
- "Exposition Pharaon de Winter", services culture & communication de la ville de Wambrechies, 2009. Exhibition catalog with biography and works.
- Zéphyr de Winter, Pharaon de Winter. Sa vie - Son enseignement - Son oeuvre. 1849 -1924, Librairie René Giard, Leleu 1926
