= Rans, Jura =

Commune in Bourgogne-Franche-Comté, France

Rans
- Commune
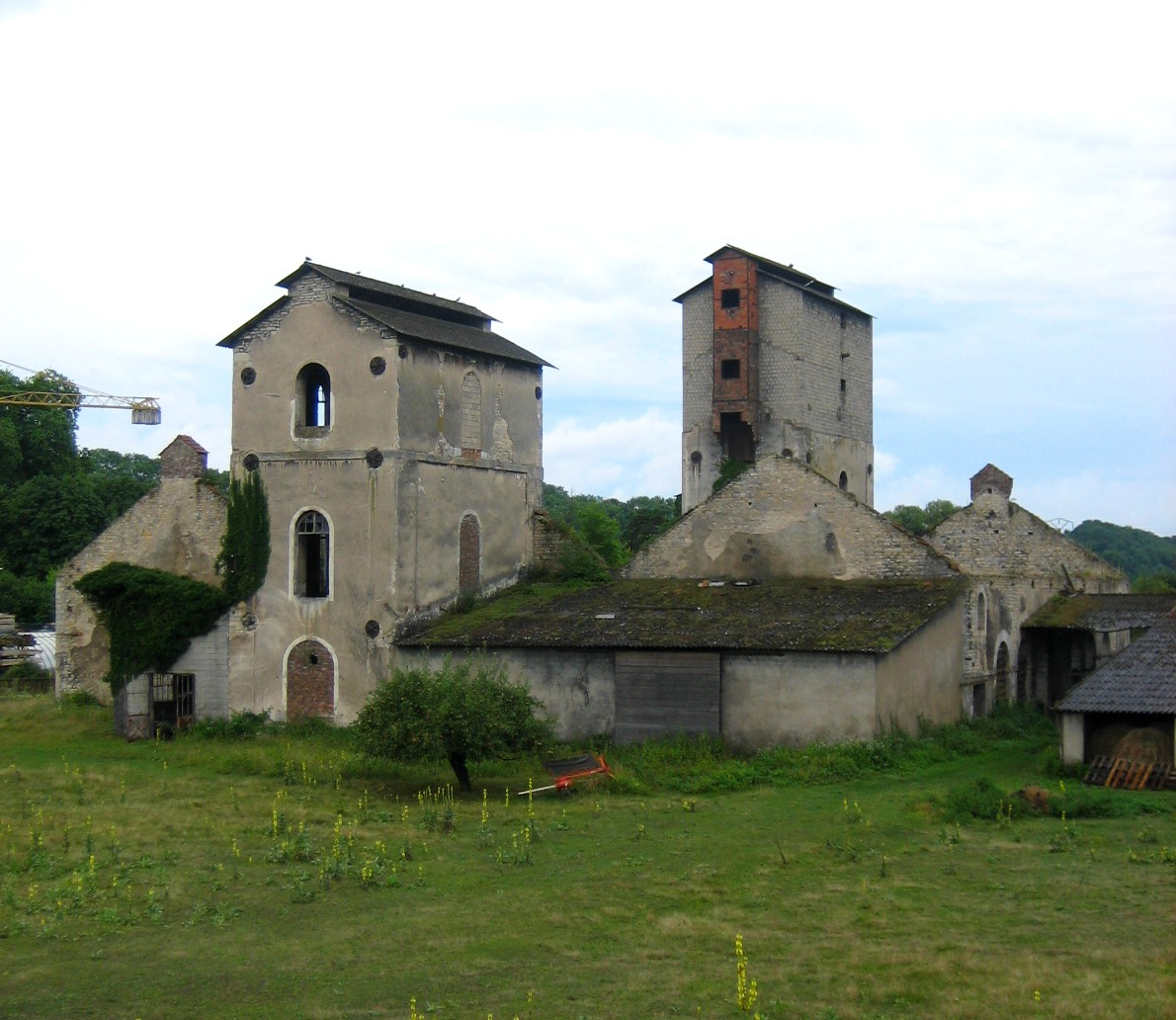
- Old forge

- Coat of arms
- Location of Rans
- Location within France Location within Bourgogne-Franche-Comté
- Coordinates: 47°08′29″N 5°43′39″E
- Country: France
- Region: Bourgogne-Franche-Comté
- Department: Jura
- Arrondissement: Dole
- Canton: Mont-sous-Vaudrey

Government
  - Mayor (2020–2026): Jean-Louis Morlier
- Area^{1}: 6.14 km^{2} (2.37 sq mi)
- Highest elevation: 269 m (883 ft)
- Lowest elevation: 209 m (686 ft)
- Population (2023): 540
  - Density: 88/km^{2} (230/sq mi)
- Time zone: UTC+01:00 (CET)
  - Summer (DST): UTC+02:00 (CEST)
- INSEE/Postal code: 39452 /39700
- ^{1} French Land Register data, which excludes lakes, ponds, glaciers > 1 km^{2} (0.386 sq mi or 247 acres) and river estuaries.

Rans is a commune in the Jura department in the region of Bourgogne-Franche-Comté in eastern France.

== Population ==
Historical population
Year	Pop.	±% p.a.
1968	350	—
1975	402	+2.00%
1982	404	+0.07%
1990	389	−0.47%
1999	416	+0.75%
2007	454	+1.10%
2012	506	+2.19%
2017	535	+1.12%
2023	540	+0.16%
Source: INSEE

== See also ==
- Communes of the Jura department
