= Friedrich Herlin =

German painter

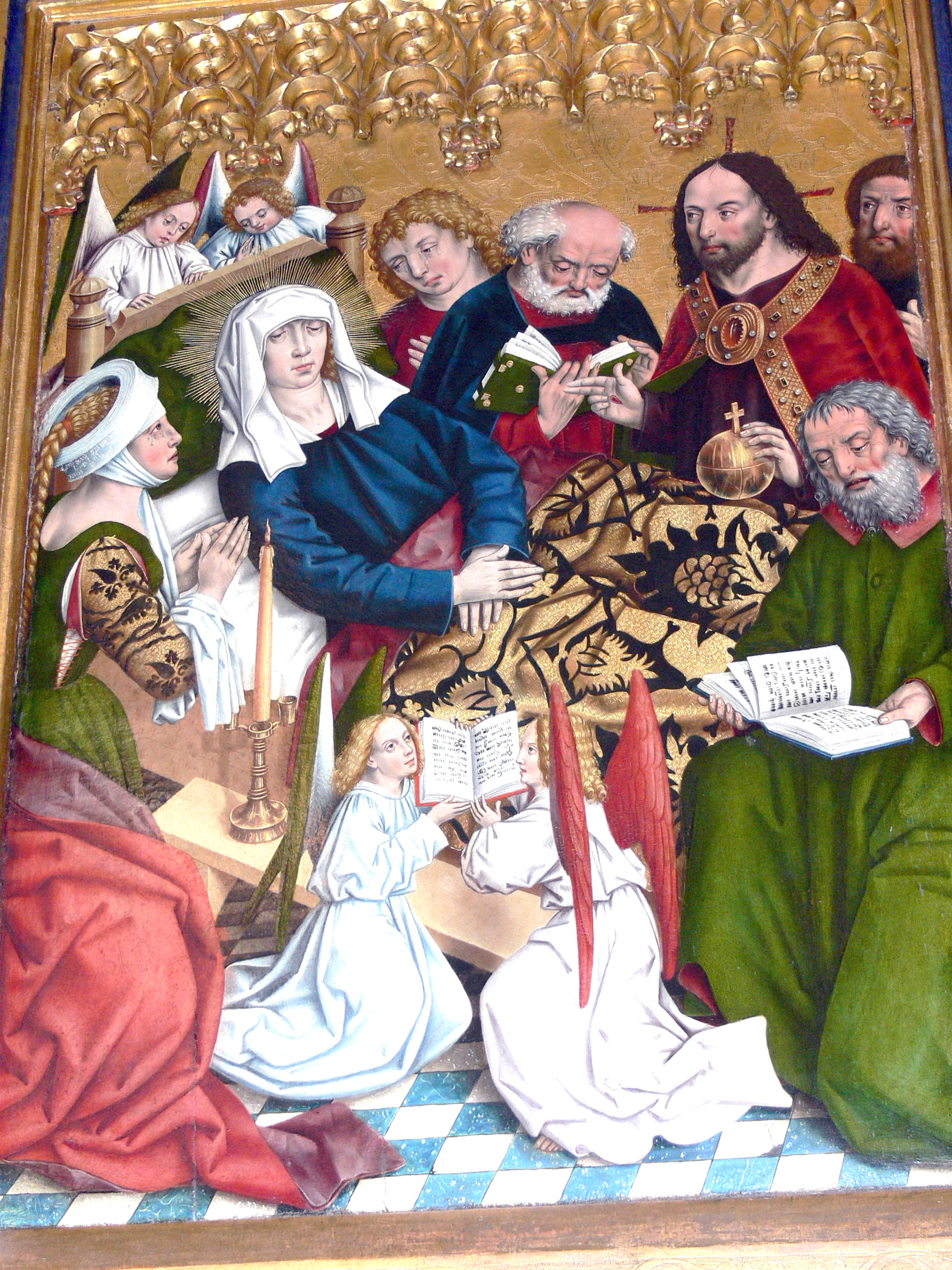
The Death of the Virgin, from an altarpiece of 1466 in St.Jakob in Rothenburg ob der Tauber.

Friedrich Herlin (c. 1425/30 – 1500) was a German painter. His earliest known work, depicting scenes from the Life of the Virgin, is dated 1459. A signature on an altarpiece in Nördlingen, dating it to 1462, identifies him as being from Rothenburg ob der Tauber, as do citizenship documents from 1467. Nevertheless, it is possible that he lived there for only a short time, and that his origins lie in Ulm, where a painter named Hans Herlin lived and worked from 1449 until 1468. Stylistically, he borrowed much from Rogier van der Weyden, indicating a great deal of familiarity with the art of the Netherlands and of Cologne. The sculpture attached to the altarpiece of 1462 in the St. George church, though officially listed as by the so-called "Master of Nördlingen", has been tentatively ascribed to Nicolaus Gerhaert, which if true would indicate extensive contacts to the highest artistic circles of the era.

Little else is known of Herlin, save that he died in Nördlingen in 1500.

== Gallery ==
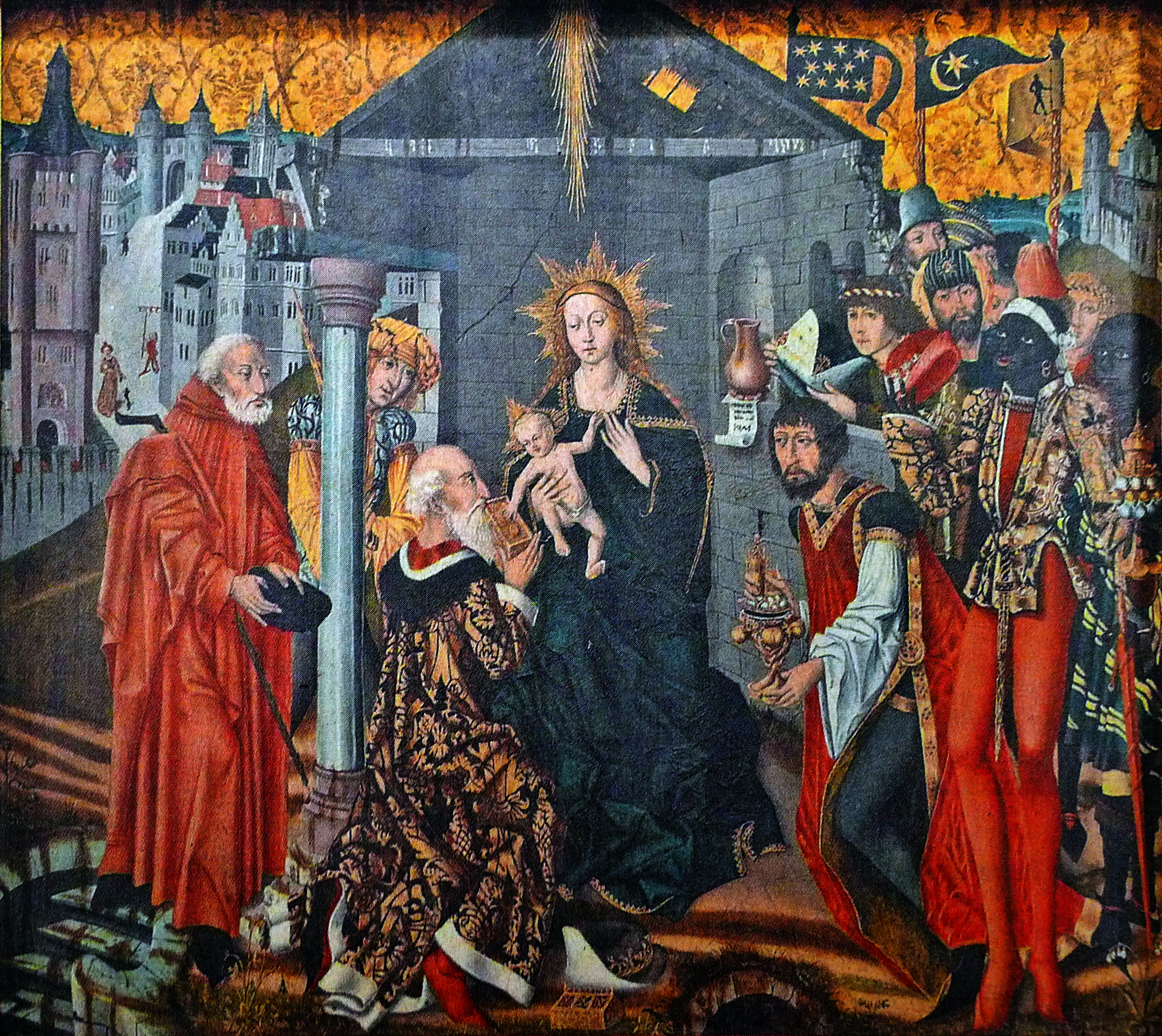
Adoration of the Kings (1473)

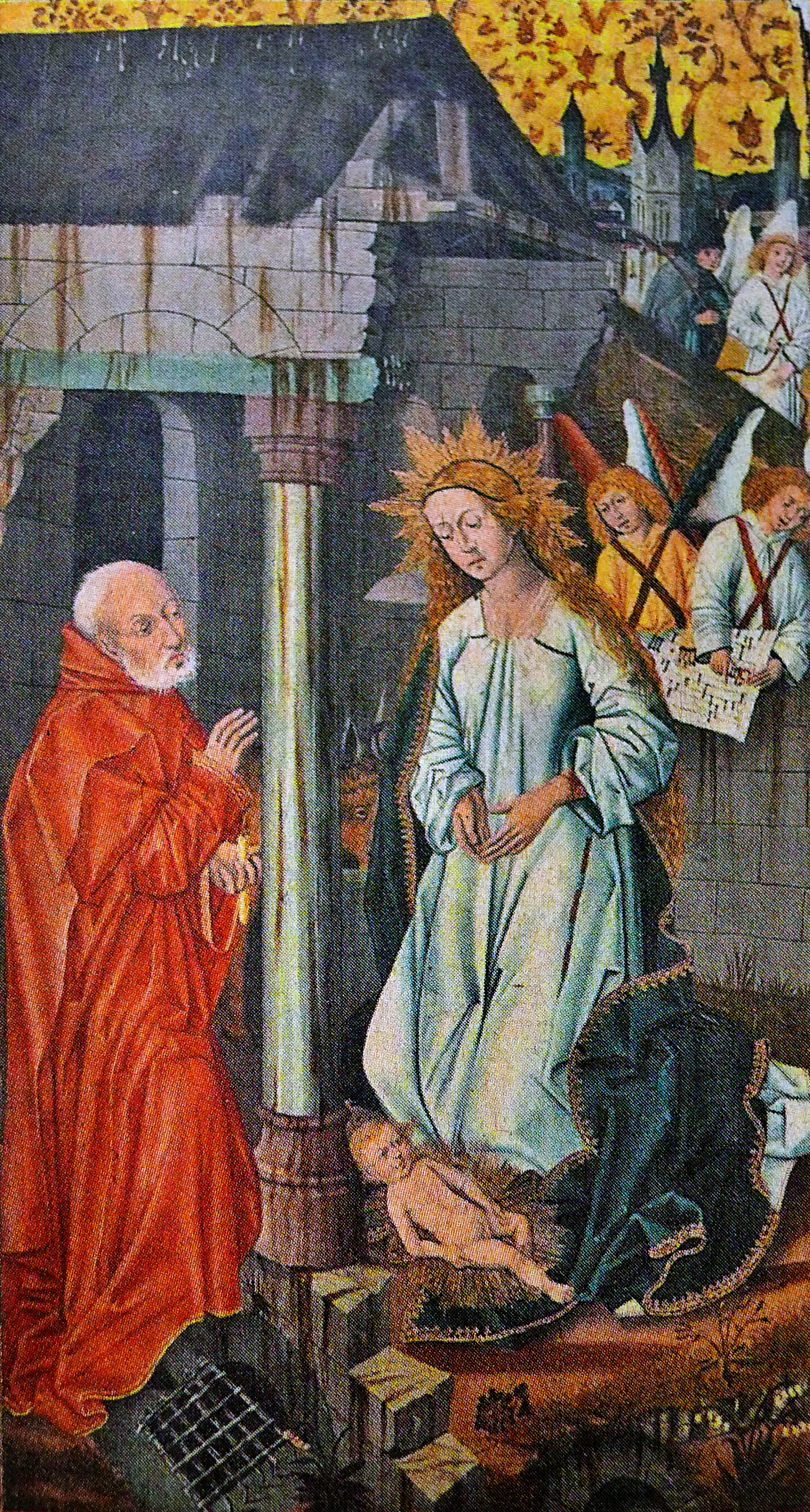
Birth of Christ (1473)

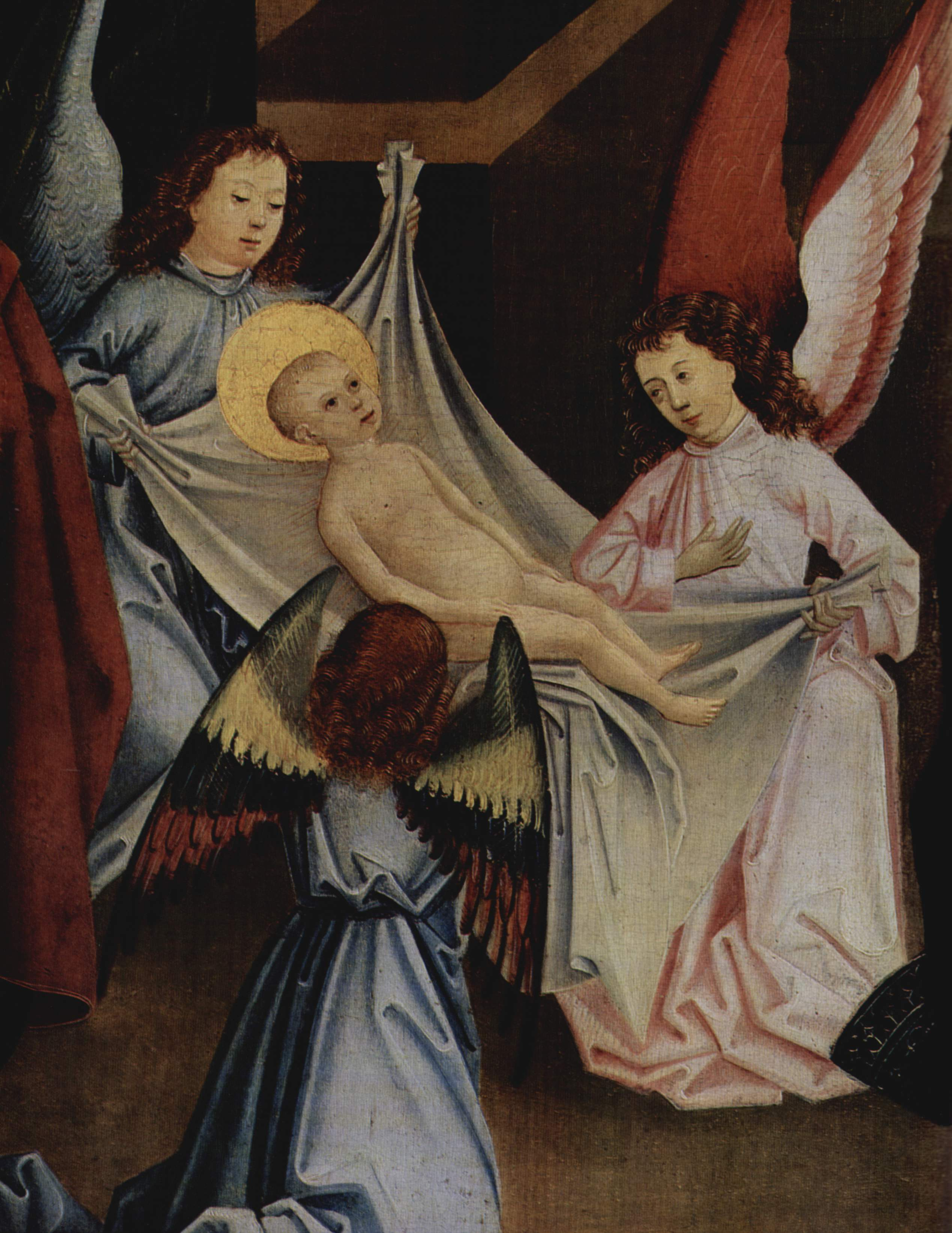
Angels carry Christ the Child

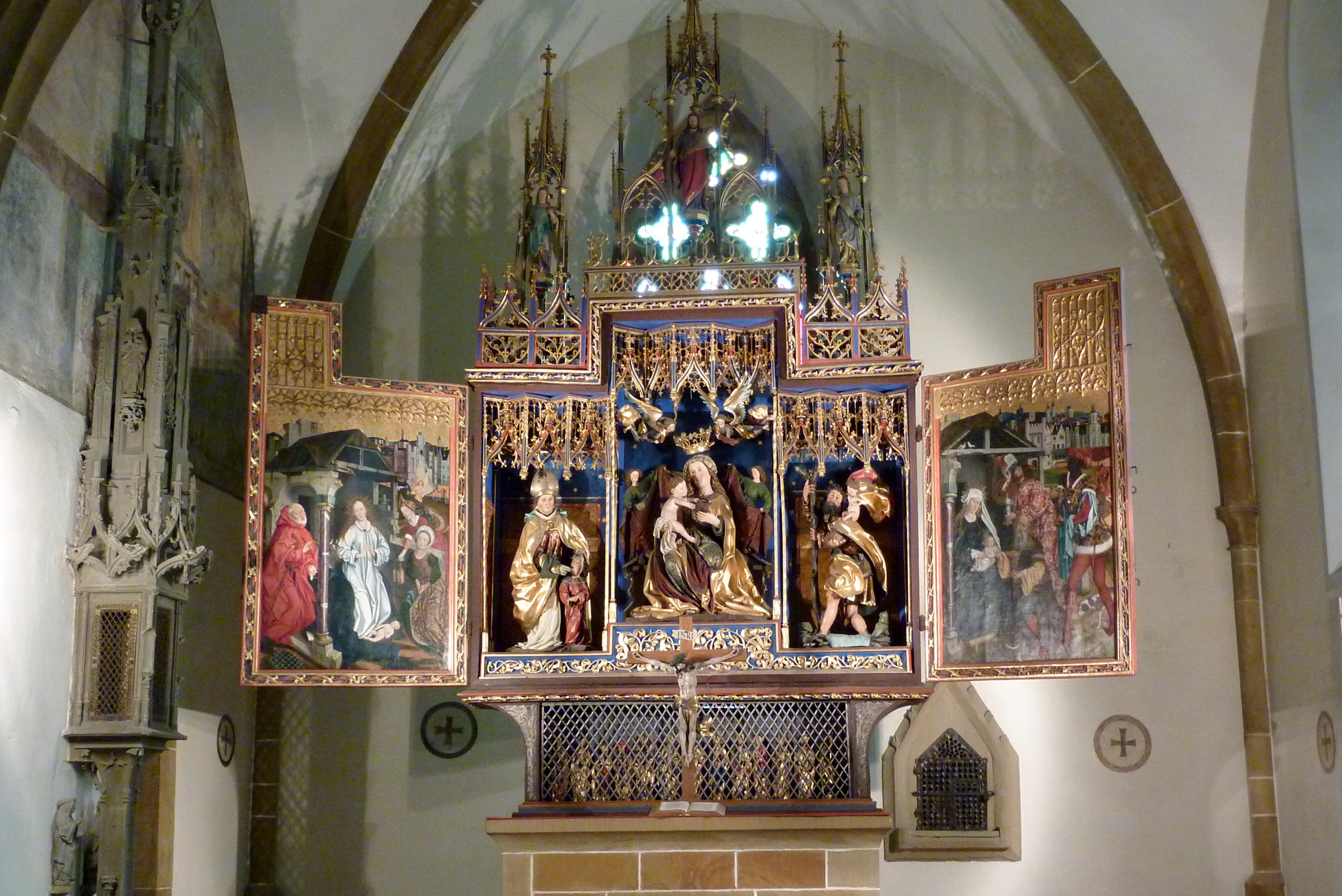
St. Blasius Altar

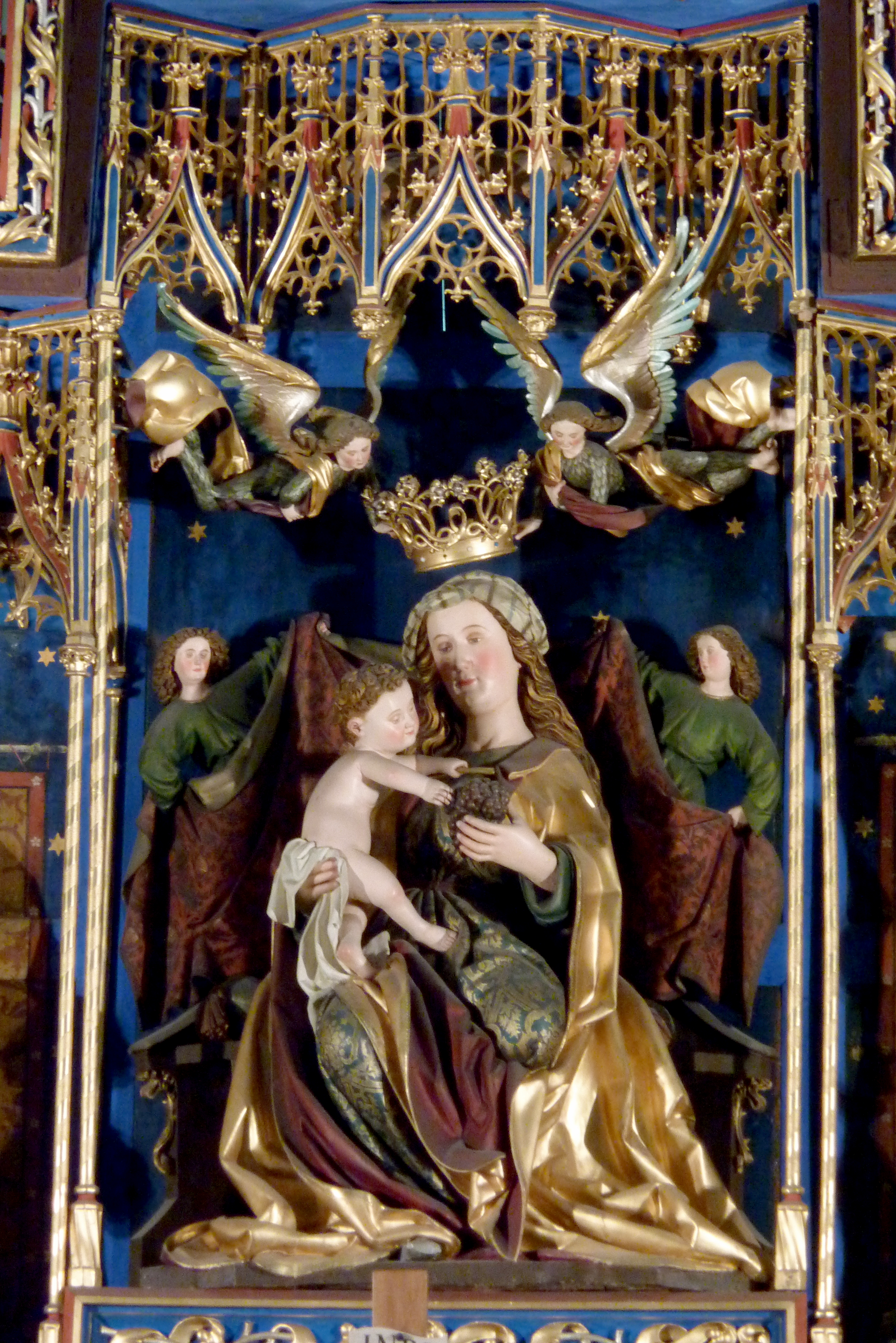
Altar detail

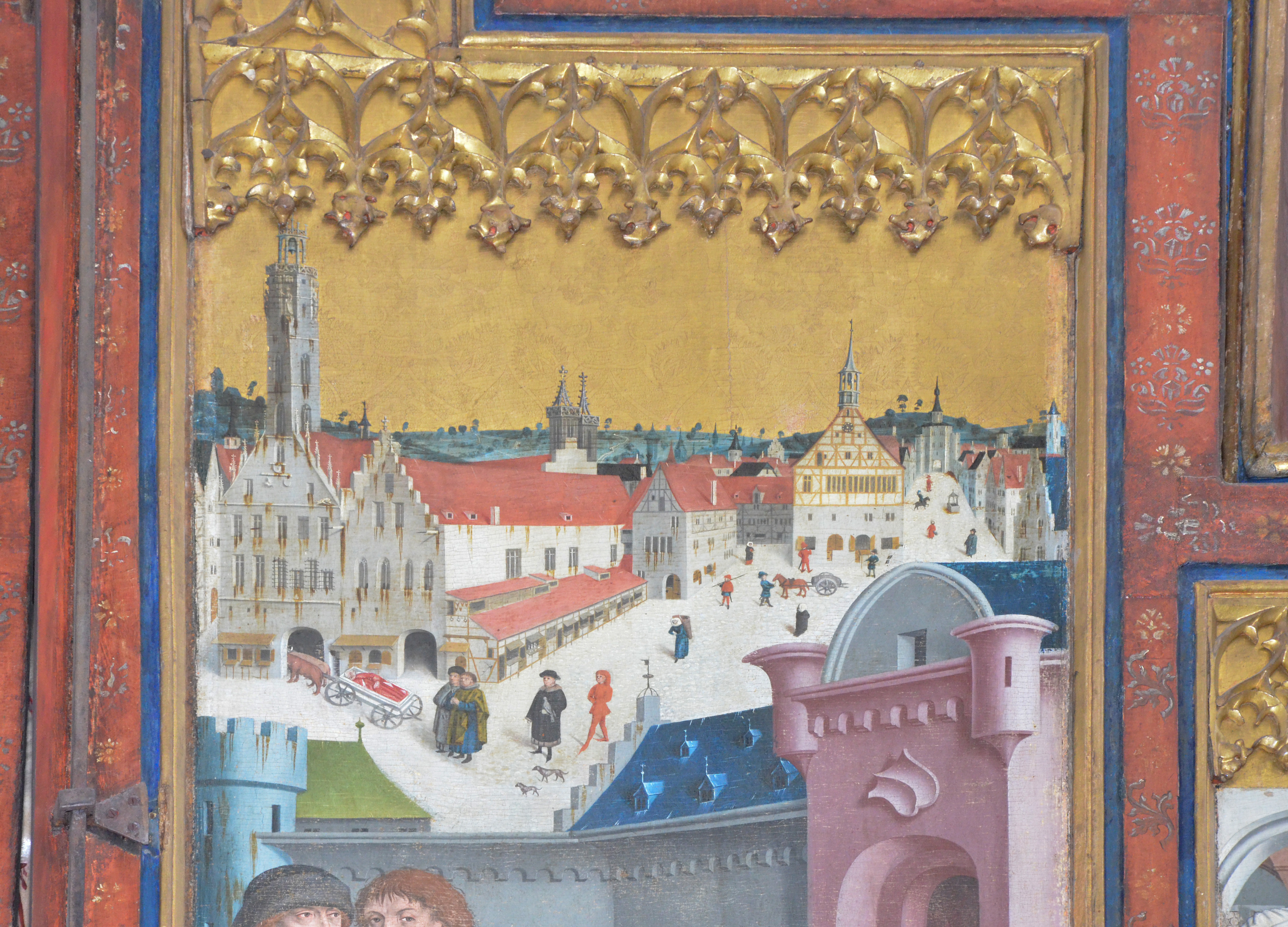
Medieval Rothenburg marketplace
