= Contributions directes =

The contributions directes were a system of four taxes, also known as the quatre vieilles, set up under the French Revolution. They were all direct taxes, willingly voted into existence by vote of the deputies, by contrast with the Ancien Régime, which mainly relied on indirect taxes.

Three of them were set up in 1790 by the National Constituent Assembly:

- the contribution foncière, on all lands;
- the contribution mobilière, on all income not derived from commerce or 'land' (with the latter including rent and industry)
- the patente, which taxed the professions according to their external signs

The fourth, the impôt sur les portes et fenêtres (comparable to the British window tax) was set up in 1798 by the French Directory. This one was not called a contribution, and was progressive.

Until the First French Empire, these for direct taxes raised enough for the state budget, but the Napoleonic Wars led to the re-establishment of indirect taxation.
