= Auguste-Joseph Herlin =

French painter

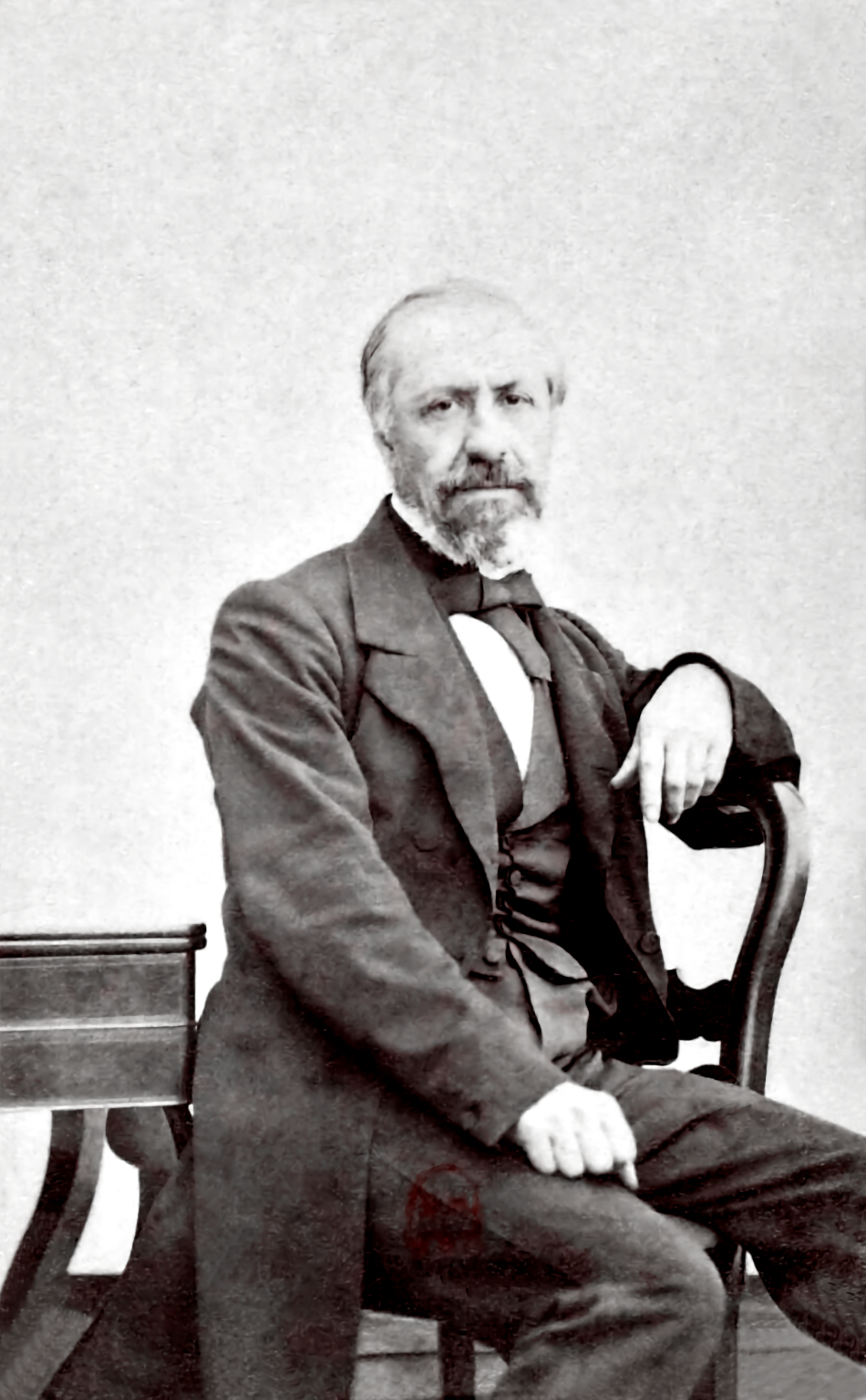
- Born: 18 August 1815; Lille, France
- Died: 13 December 1900 (aged 85); Lille, France
- Occupations: Businessman, painter

Auguste-Joseph Herlin (18 August 1815 – 13 December 1900) was a French genre painter from Lille.

== Life ==
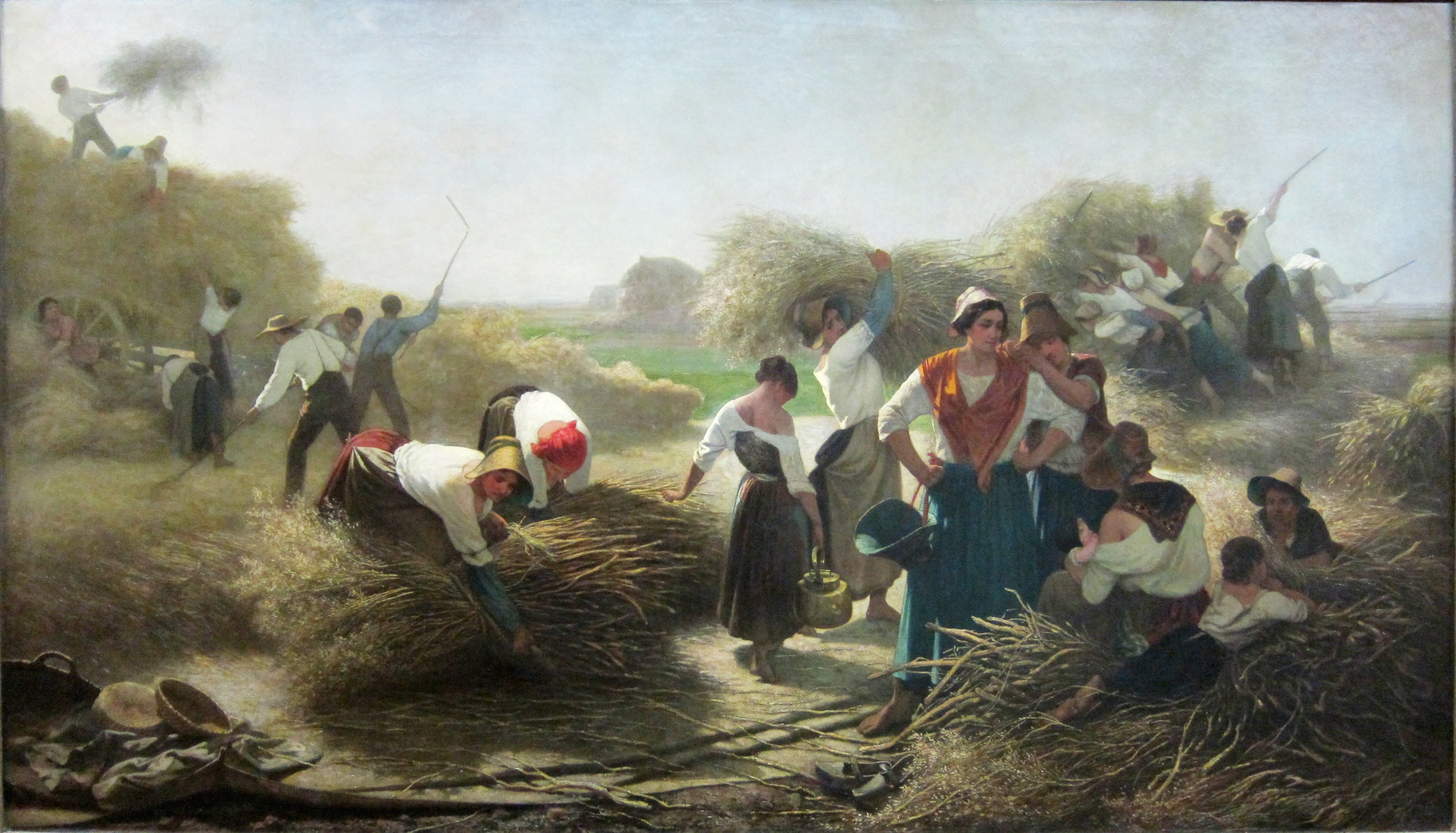
Battage de colza dans la plaine de Lille (Threshing Rapeseed in the plain of Lille, 1861)

Auguste-Joseph Herlin was born in Lille on 18 August 1815. His parents were Joseph Herlin and Julie Desrousseaux, both from Lille. His father was a merchant. After completing his studies at the local college he joined his father's business. He and his brother Théodore jointly managed the business. Between 1840 and 1848 he followed his marked penchant for the arts, and studied painting under François Souchon. He won two medals, including a first class medal in 1843.

In 1850 Herlin resigned from business and devoted himself to the arts. With independent means, he was not dependent on his work to make a living and could paint what he wanted. Herlin's paintings belonged to the school of Édouard Muller. He excelled both in his drawing and his use of color. His Visite au confrère, which drew much attention at the Lille Exhibition after it returned from the Salon of Paris, has been called a minor masterpiece.

For many years Herlin was administrator of the academic schools in Lille and a member of the commissions of the Lille museums of painting and of drawing. In 1890 he was conservator of the Lille museum of painting and president of the commission of Lille museums. Herlin became a member of the Lille Society of Sciences and Arts in 1883, and became the society's president in 1892. In 1891 Herlin was named a knight of the Legion of Honor for his services to the arts. Herlin died on 13 December 1900 at the age of 85.

== Works ==
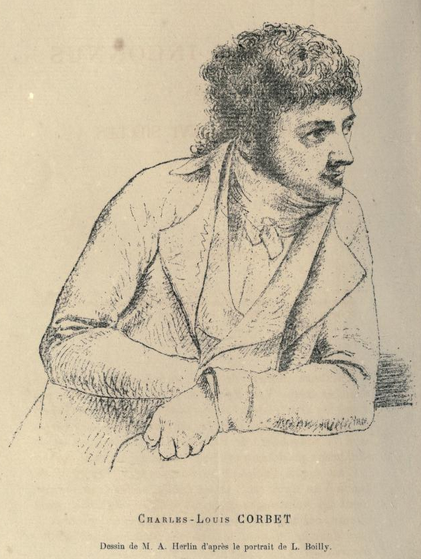
Charles-Louis Corbet, by Herlin after Louis-Léopold Boilly (1761-1845)

=== Salon ===
Herlin exhibited several paintings at the Salon in Paris, including:

- 1861 Battage de colza dans la plaine de Lille
- 1861 Le Viatique
- 1861 L'Alloir
- 1863 Le Train de plaisir
- 1866 L'Enterrement d'un pauvre au village
- 1866 La Visite au confrère
- 1867 La Lessive
- 1875 La Soif
- 1876 Une Affaire d'honneur

=== Other exhibitions ===
Herlin's Les Blanchisseuses (The Washerwomen) was engraved by The Illustrated London News in December 1867. At the international expositions in Brussels and London in 1867 he submitted:

- Le Jardin de M. le curé (The Priest's Garden)
- Le Bateau à l'herbe (Boat on the Grass)
- Le Filet (The Net)
- Paysage (Landscape)

== Sources ==
- Quarré-Reybourbon, L. (1906-09-06). "HERLIN (Auguste-Joseph)". Bulletin du Comité des Sociétés des Beaux-Arts des Départments. Ministry of Public Education, Beaux-Arts and Religion.
- Verly, Hippolyte (1869). "HERLIN (Auguste-Joseph)". Essai de Biographie Lilloise contemporaine 1800 - 1869, augmenté d'un supplément et accompagné de notes historiques et bibliographiques. Leleu.
- Véron, Eugène; Leroi, Paul (1890). Courrier de l'art. Librairie de l'art.
