= Xavier Sigalon =

French painter (1787–1837)

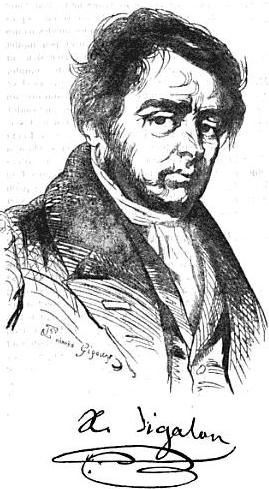
- Sigalon in Le Magasin pittoresque, Paris, 1838
- Born: 1787; Uzès, Languedoc, Kingdom of France
- Died: 18 August 1837 (aged 49–50); Rome, Italy
- Occupation: Painter
- Known for: Copy of The Last Judgement

Xavier Sigalon (1787 – 18 August 1837) was a French painter. He was one of the few leaders of the romantic movement who cared more for treatment of form than of colour.

== Biography ==
Xavier Sigalon was born in Uzès, in the Province of Languedoc (now Gard), towards the end of 1787, son of a poor rural schoolmaster. With great difficulty he came to Paris and obtained admission to the studio of Pierre-Narcisse Guérin. He did not agree with the instruction he was given, and tried to train himself by studying the Italian masters in the gallery of the Louvre. In 1822 he exhibited The Young Courtesan, which at once attracted attention and was bought for the Luxembourg.

Sigalon continued to challenge himself, producing Locusta in 1824, and Athaliahs Massacre in 1827. Both these works showed incontestable power; but the Vision of St Jerôme, which appeared at the Salon of 1831, and the Crucifixion, were much the most individual of all his achievements. In 1831 he received the cross of the Legion of Honour. His paintings at this time, although powerful in their drawing and composition, were not colorful and did not sell. Sigalon found himself forced to earn a humble living by painting portraits.

In 1833 Adolphe Thiers, then minister of the interior, recalled Sigalon to Paris and entrusted him with the task of copying the Sistine fresco of The Last Judgement for a hall in the Palace of the Fine Arts. His friend François Souchon agreed to assist Sigalon in this huge task. There was a dispute between the two artists, and Souchon returned to Paris. He was replaced as Sigalon's assistant by Numa Boucoiran. When Sigalon exhibited his gigantic work in the Baths of Diocletian at Rome, he was visited in state by Gregory XVI. Sigalon carried his copy back to Paris in February 1837. He returned to Rome some time later to copy the pendants of the Sistine Chapel, but succumbed to an attack of cholera on 18 August 1837.
