= Rue Voltaire, Grenoble =

French street

Rue Voltaire
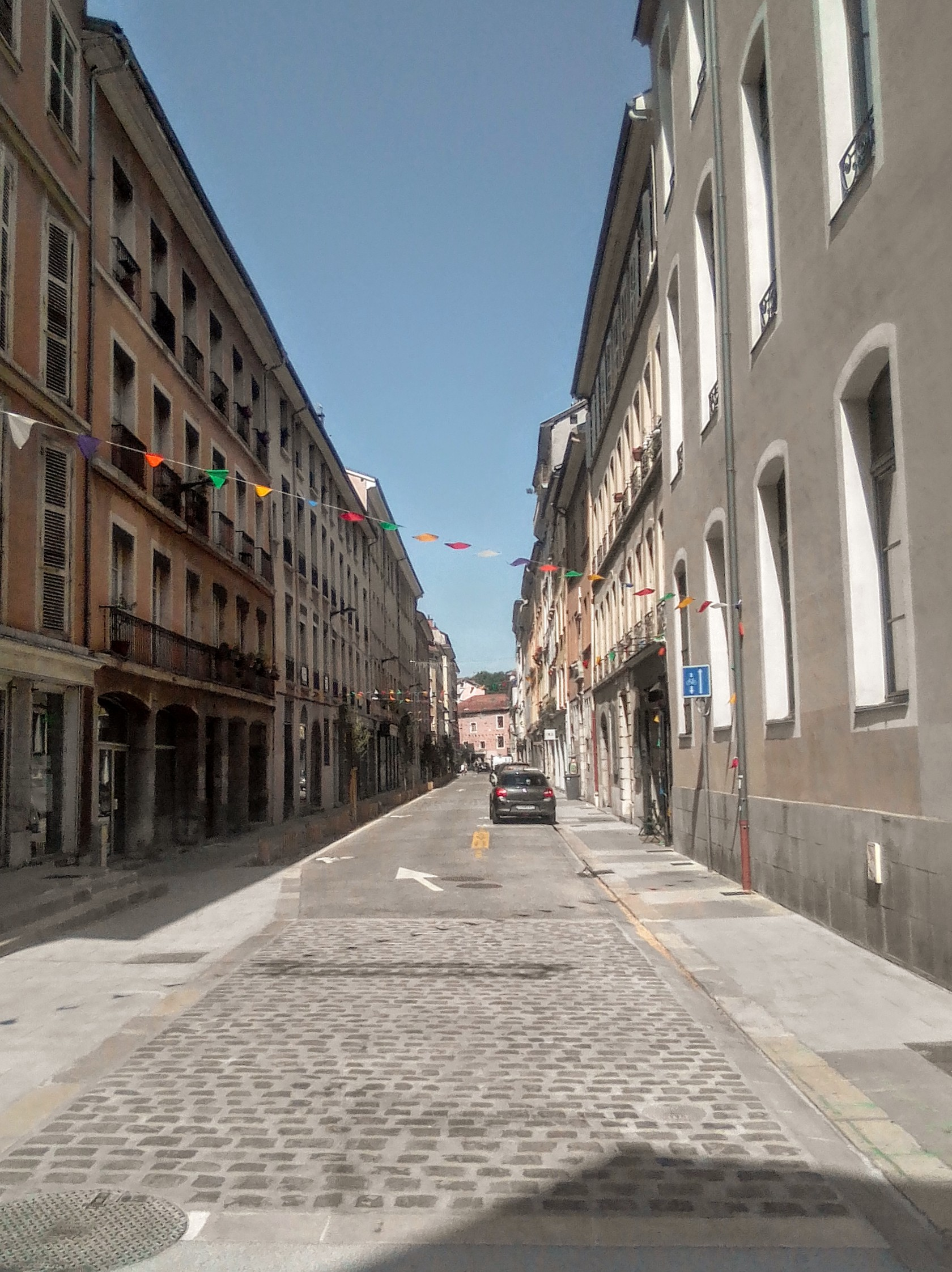
- Location: Grenoble
- Coordinates: 45°11′26″N 5°43′56″E

Rue Voltaire (French pronunciation: [ʁy vɔltɛʁ]) is a public road in the French municipality of Grenoble. The street connects rue Raoul-Blanchard and place de Verdun to rue Bayard, as well as rue Très-Cloîtres.

== Location and access ==
This road, open to automobile traffic in one direction, begins at the intersection of rue Bayard and rue Dominique Villars, then ends at the intersection of rue Raoul-Blanchard and rue Général Marchand at number 20 of the street, which is then extended by rue Servan which leads to rue Très-Cloîtres.

=== Access ===
==== Walk ====
The street, included in the main commercial area of the city, is accessible to pedestrians from any point in the Notre-Dame district, the oldest district in Grenoble.

==== Public transport ====
Rue Voltaire is mainly served by lines A and B of the Grenoble tramway. The nearest station is called Hubert Dubedout - Maison du Tourisme.

== Origin of the name ==
Long called rue Neuve des Capucins due to its proximity to the Capuchin convent of Grenoble. In 1837, the name was changed to rue Saint-Vincent-de-Paul, a name it kept until 1873, when it became rue Voltaire in homage to François-Marie Arouet, known as Voltaire a French philosopher.

== History ==
This street is home to many historic residences. It is in this street that Albert de Bérulle, first president of the Parliament of Grenoble, lived in 1785 and who, in 1788, was exiled because he had refused to register the edicts of the Duke of Clermont-Tonnerre, governor of Grenoble. The street also belongs to the antiques district of Grenoble with rue Bayard, place des Tilleuls and rue Dominique Villarshas. Every year the street and the neighborhood host a flea market.

After a year of work carried out between March 2021 and April 2022, rue Voltaire, completely renovated, was reopened to pedestrian and automobile traffic. The old paving stones dating from the 17th century, rediscovered during the construction site, were brought to light and serve as a road surface at the end of its route.

== Notable buildings ==
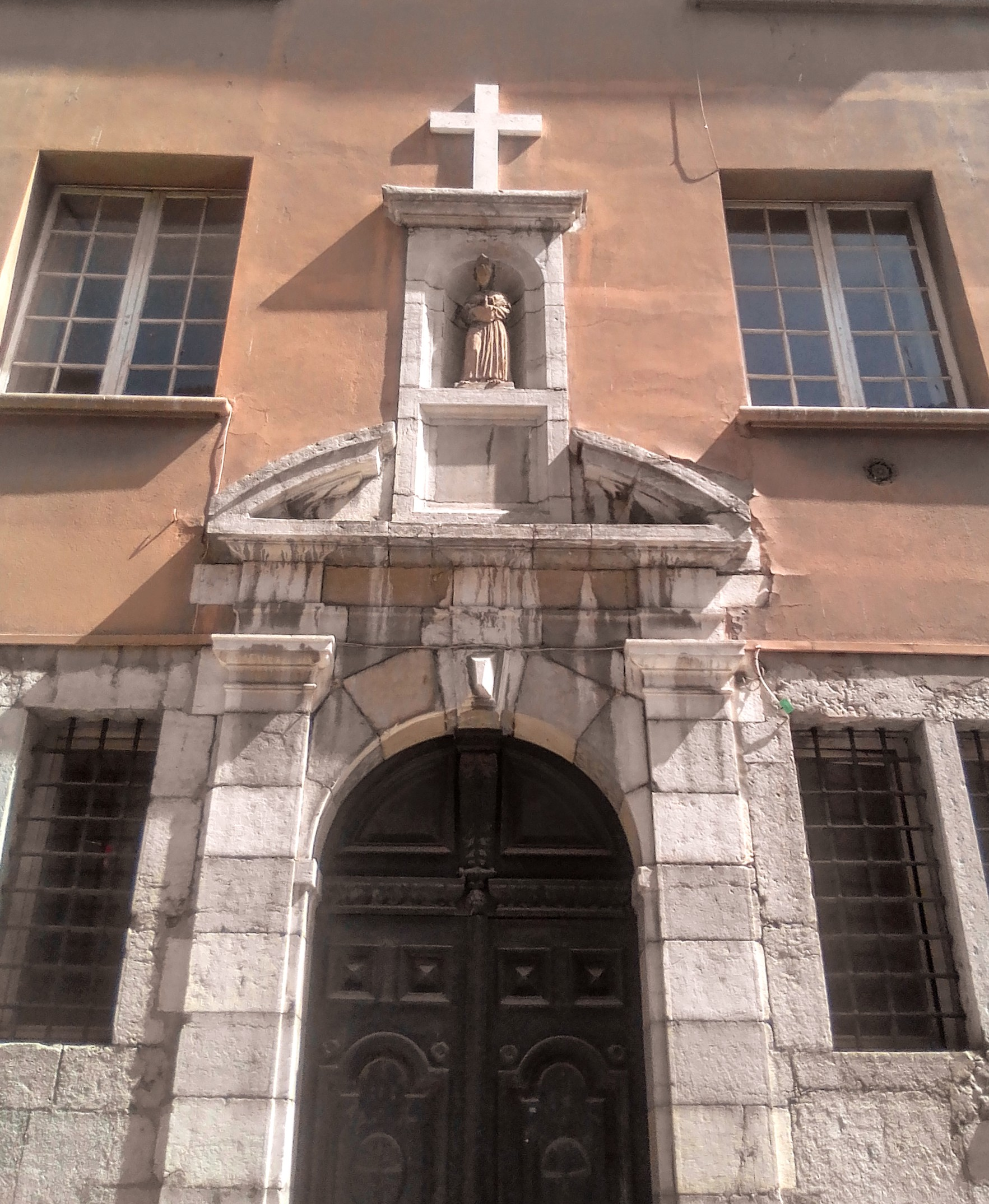
Entrance to Chapelle des pénitents blancs of Grenoble

=== N°1 ===
A 19th-century building. The doorway is made up of cast-iron panels and Greek friezes hides a backyard which served as a depot for carriages during the 19th century. The paving of this courtyard dates from this period.

=== N°6 ===
Doorway of the former Hôtel de la Première présidence, built around 1625. The arched carriage door dates from the redevelopments of 1771. The building has two returning wings framing a courtyard at the rear.

=== N°12 ===
Pedestrian crossing at the corner of number 12 rue Voltaire and number 2 rue Raoul Blanchard, a covered passage to a courtyard which leads to a second passage which, in turn, leads to the halle Sainte-Claire, a market hall located in the old city center of Grenoble.

=== N°17 ===
Facade of the Chapelle des Pénitents blancs, dating from 1657. Its entrance provides access to a building housing rooms for the use of this secular brotherhood while the chapel occupies the rear part of the building. This includes a 17th-century retablo in carved wood, as well as a marble high altar with angel heads and garlands of roses. It houses wooden stalls from the 15th century, coming from the former Cistercian convent of Crolles. The building also serves as a place of worship for the Russian Orthodox parish of Grenoble. According to the researcher, specialist in religious architecture Gilles-Marie Moreau, this place is probably the only place of worship in the department of Isère which remains with its facade and its interior design.

Some photos of rue Voltaire

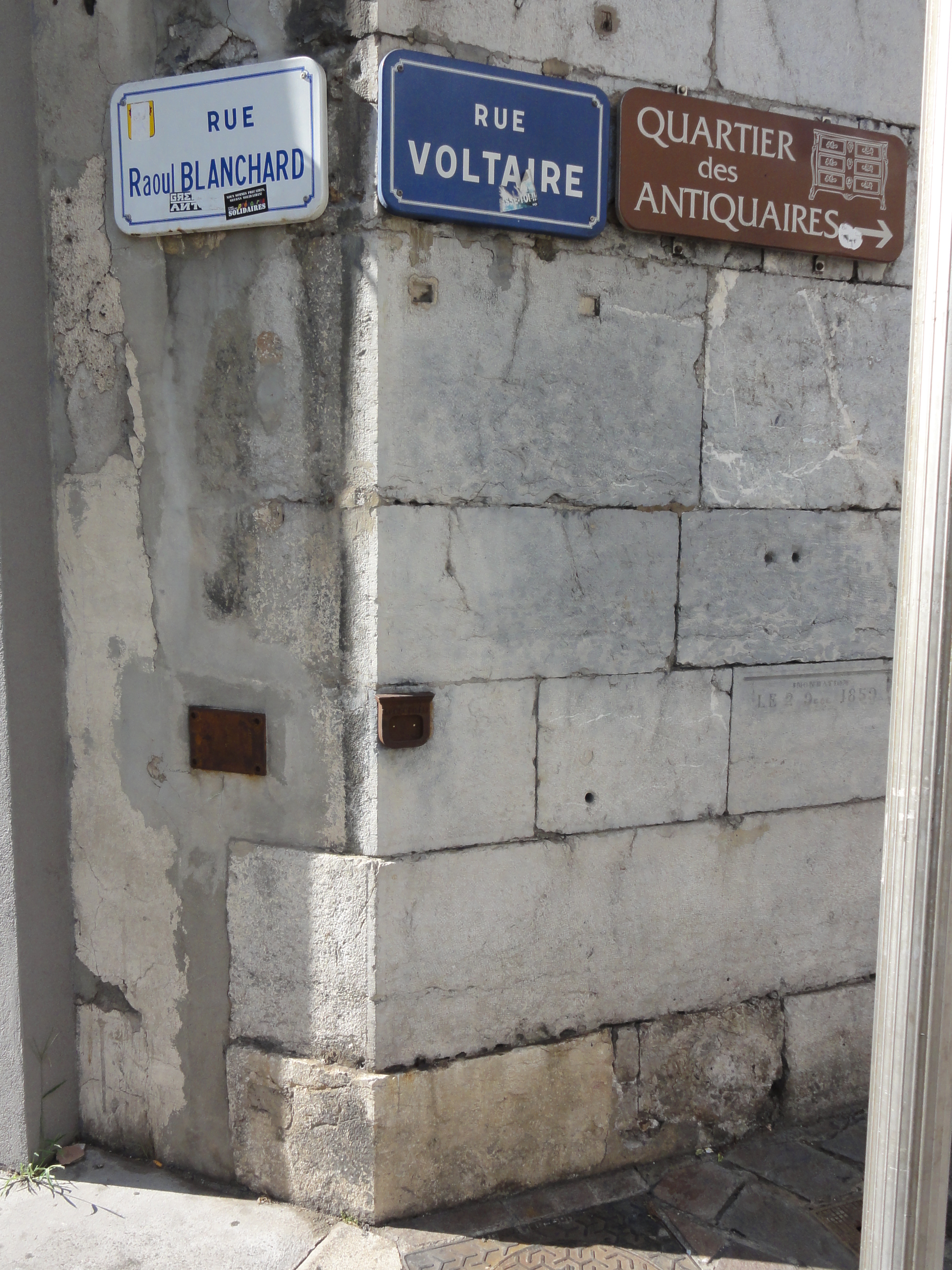
Angle of rue Voltaire of rue Raoul Blanchard

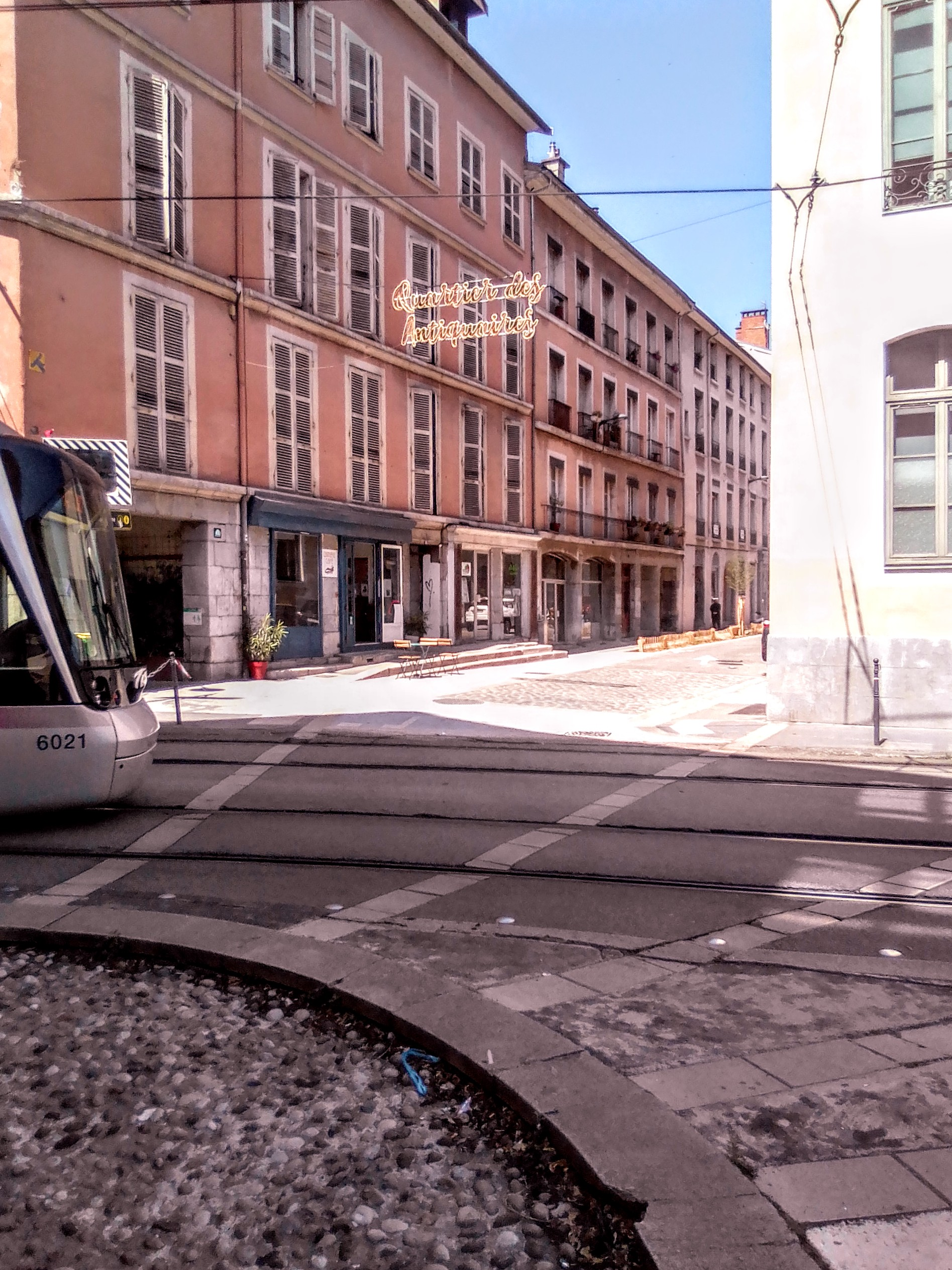
Rue Voltaire (angle rue Général Marchand)

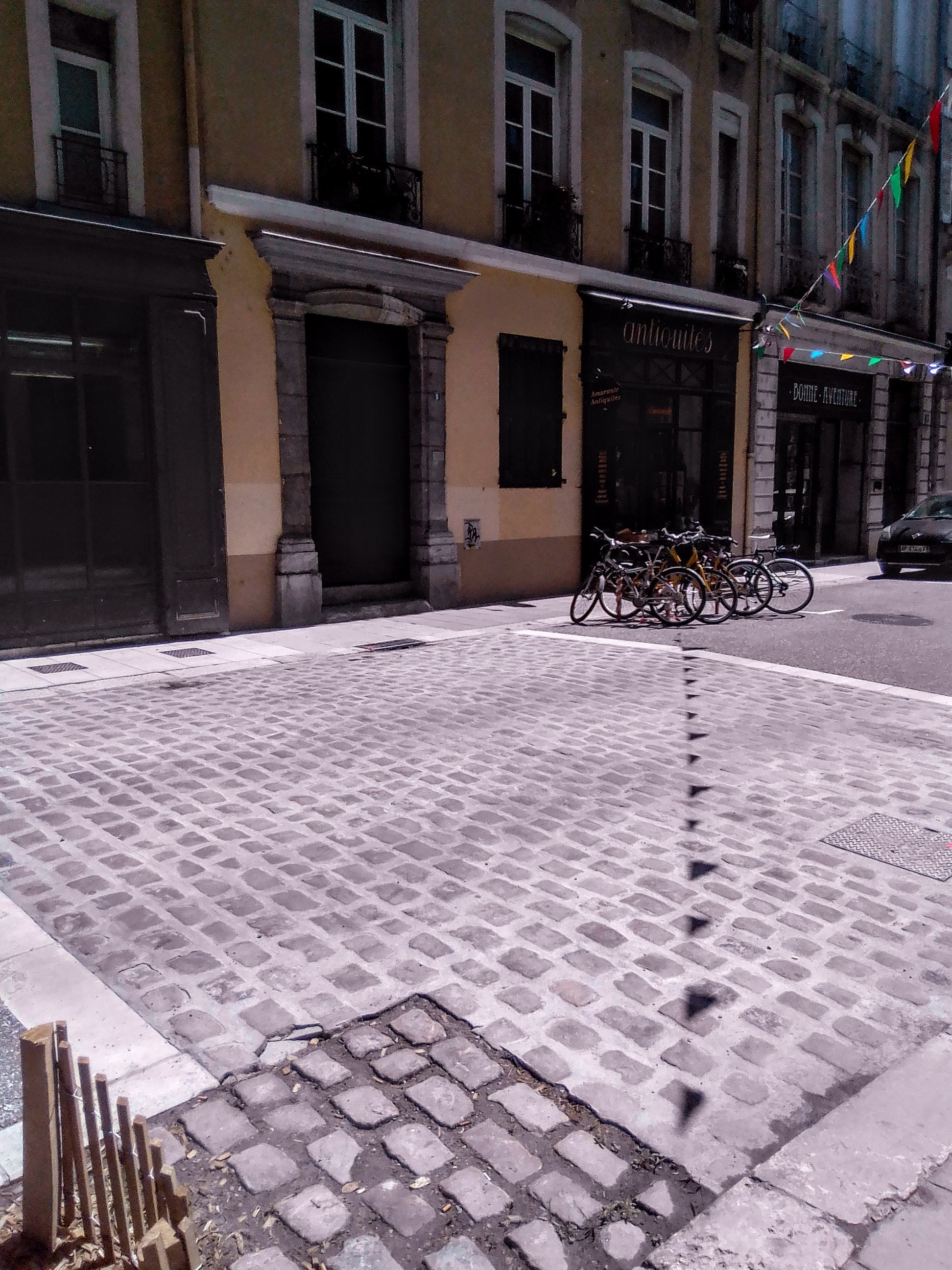
Rue Voltaire (street pavement)

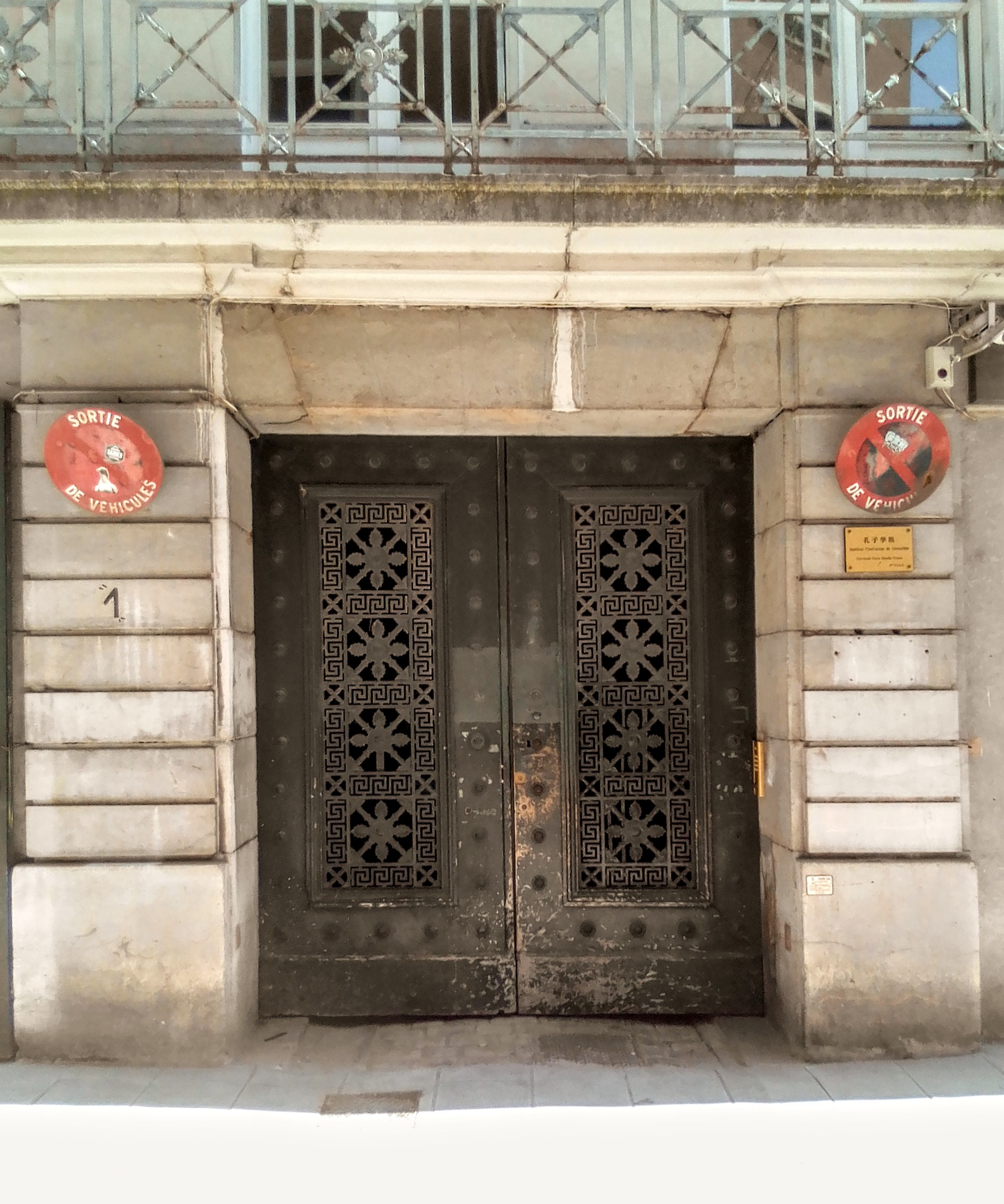
Rue Voltaire (N°1)

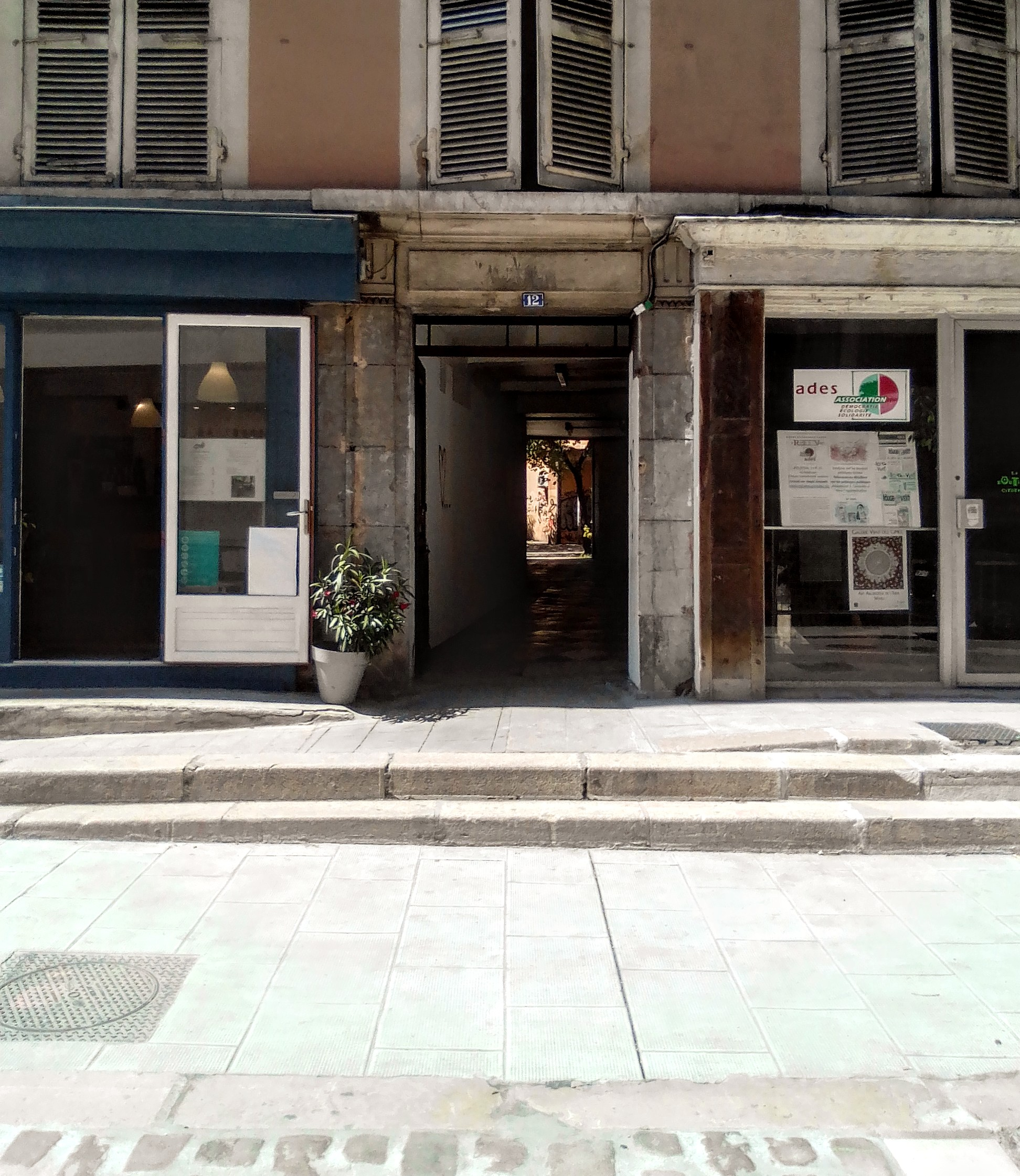
Rue Voltaire (N°12)

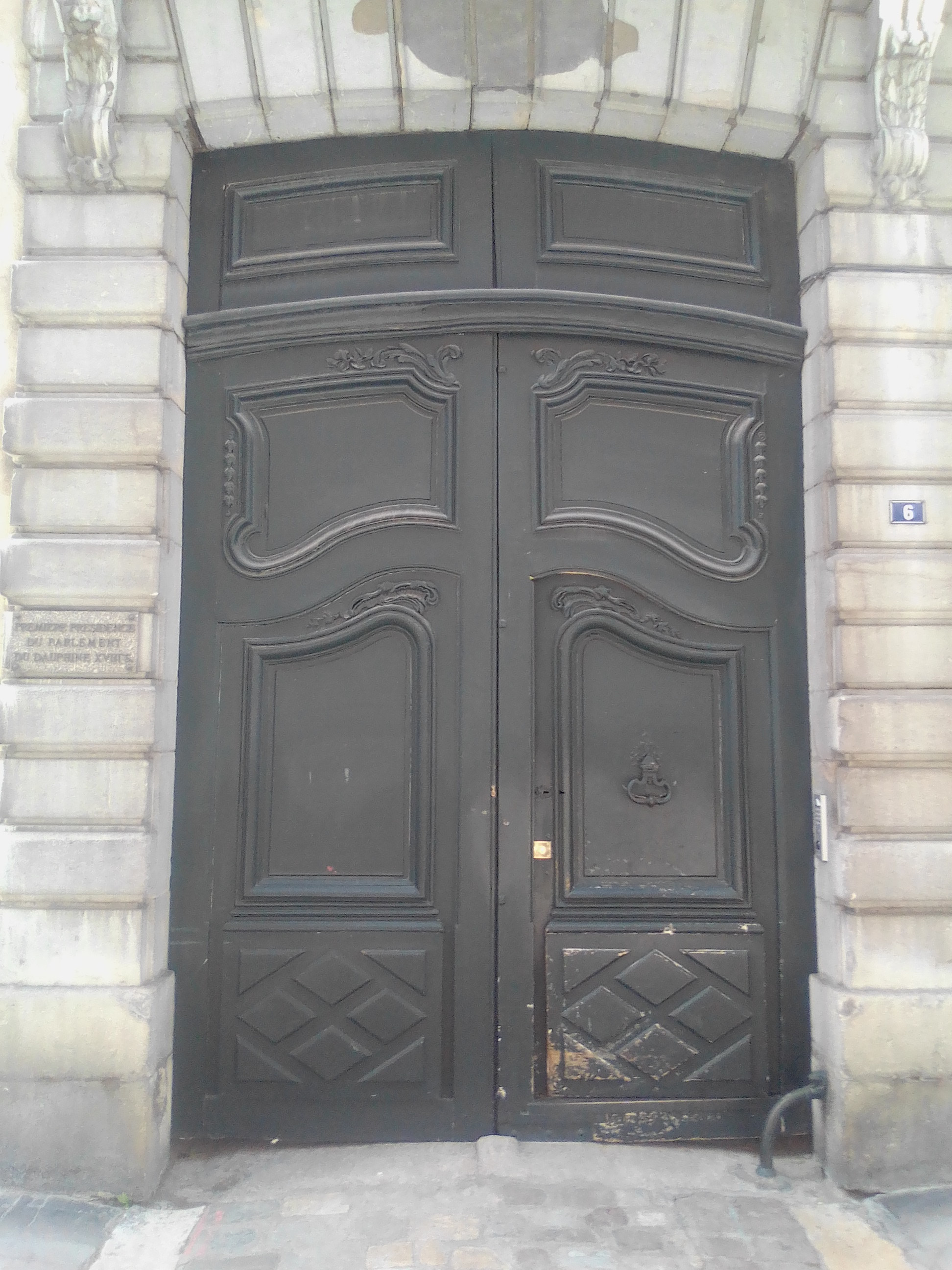
Rue Voltaire (entrance of l'Hôtel de la Première présidence)

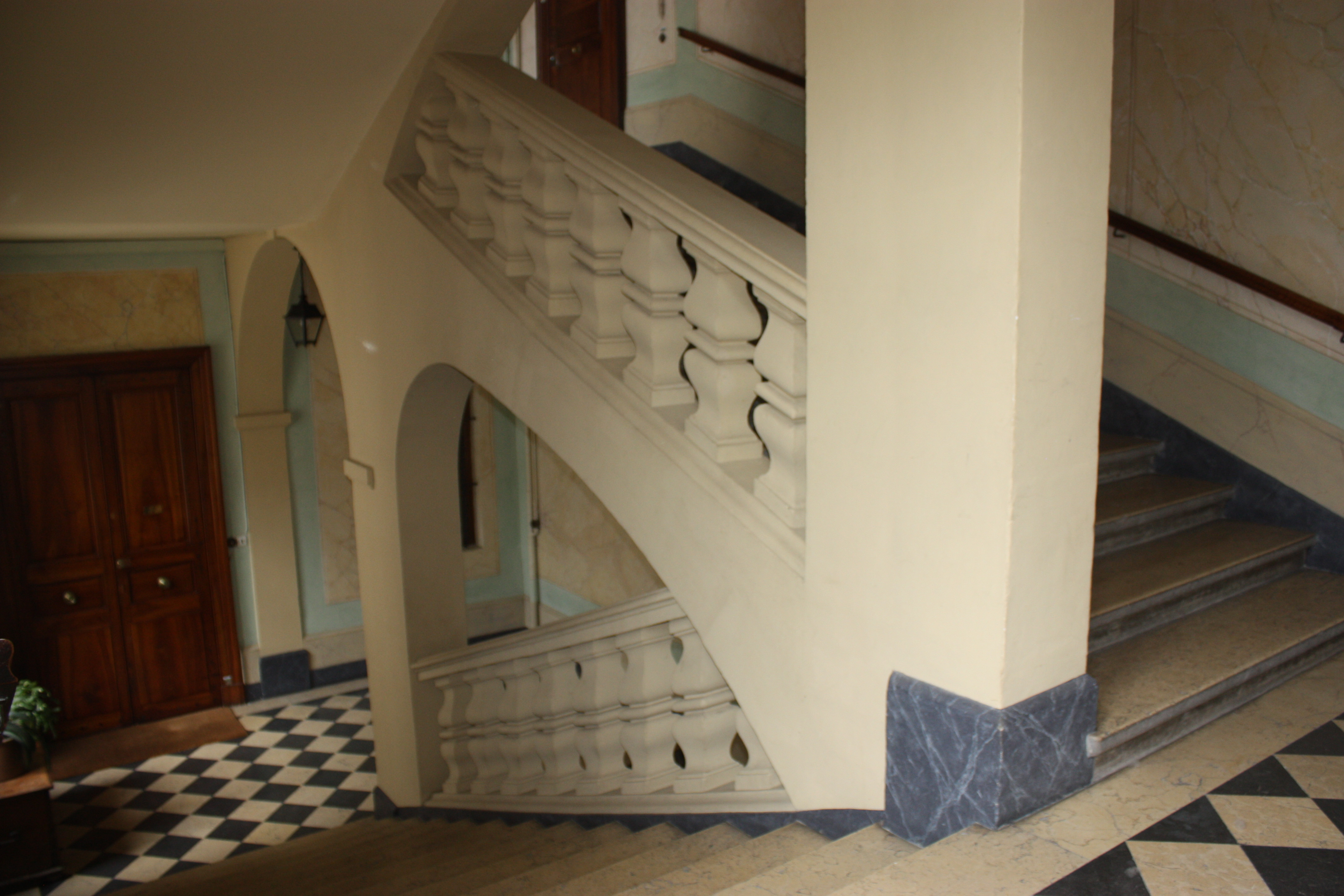
Stairs of Hôtel de la Première présidence

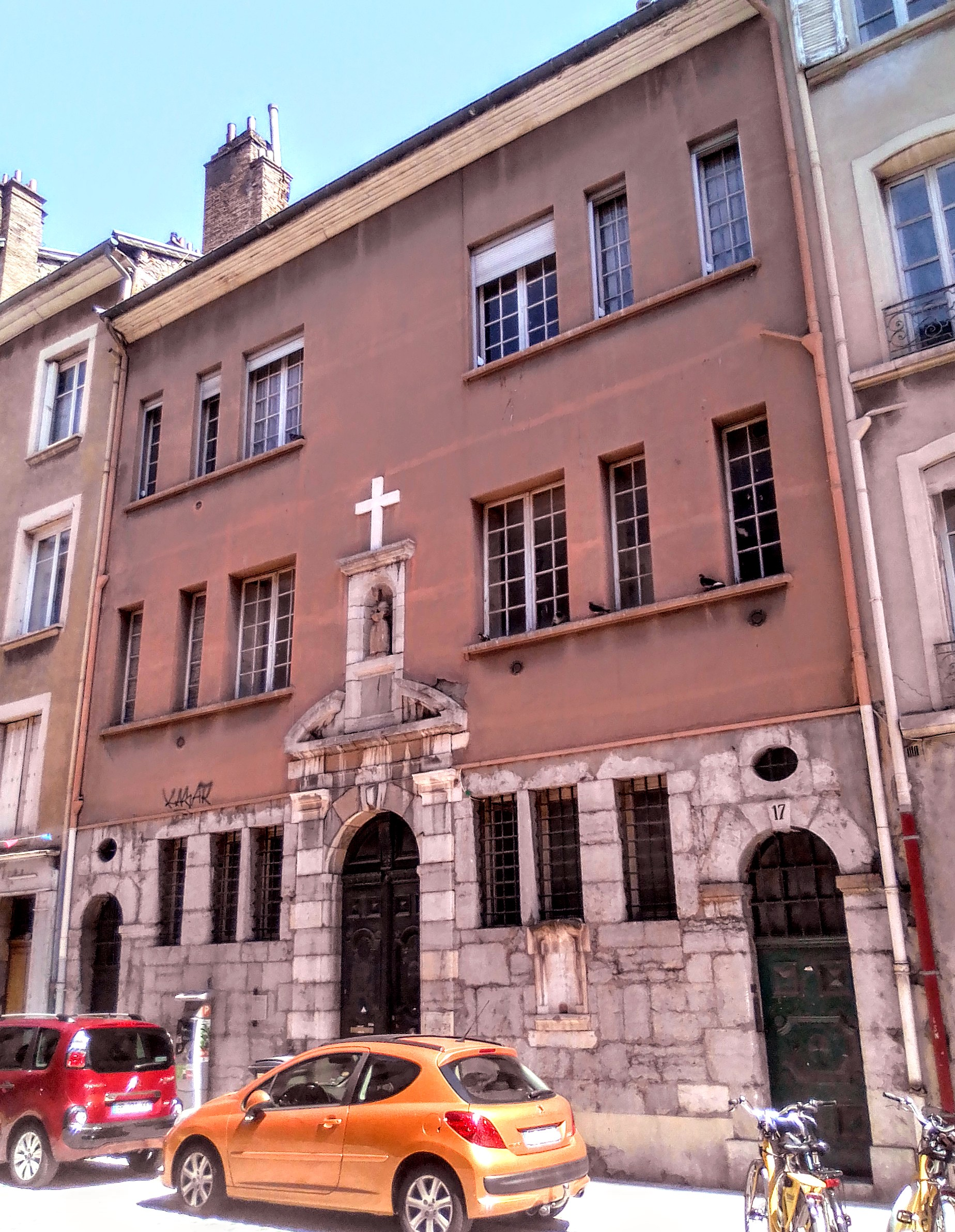
Rue Voltaire, chapelle des Pénitents blancs

== See also ==
- Timeline of Grenoble
- List of streets and squares in Grenoble
