= Eric-Paul Stekel =

Éric-Paul Stekel, (born Erich Stekel in Vienna on 27 June 1898, died in Grenoble on 11 February 1978) was a French composer and conductor of Austrian origin, former director of the Conservatory of Grenoble.

He worked with piano teacher Félicien Wolff, whom he strongly encouraged his composition work, and he worked also with pianist Genevieve Dinand and with musicologist Paul-Gilbert Langevin, participating in his works, Le siècle de Bruckner and Anton Bruckner, apogée de la symphonie. There is an association in Grenoble called The friends of Éric-Paul Stekel.

He was the son of Viennese psychoanalyst Wilhelm Stekel.
