= Rue Bayard, Grenoble =

French street

Rue Bayard
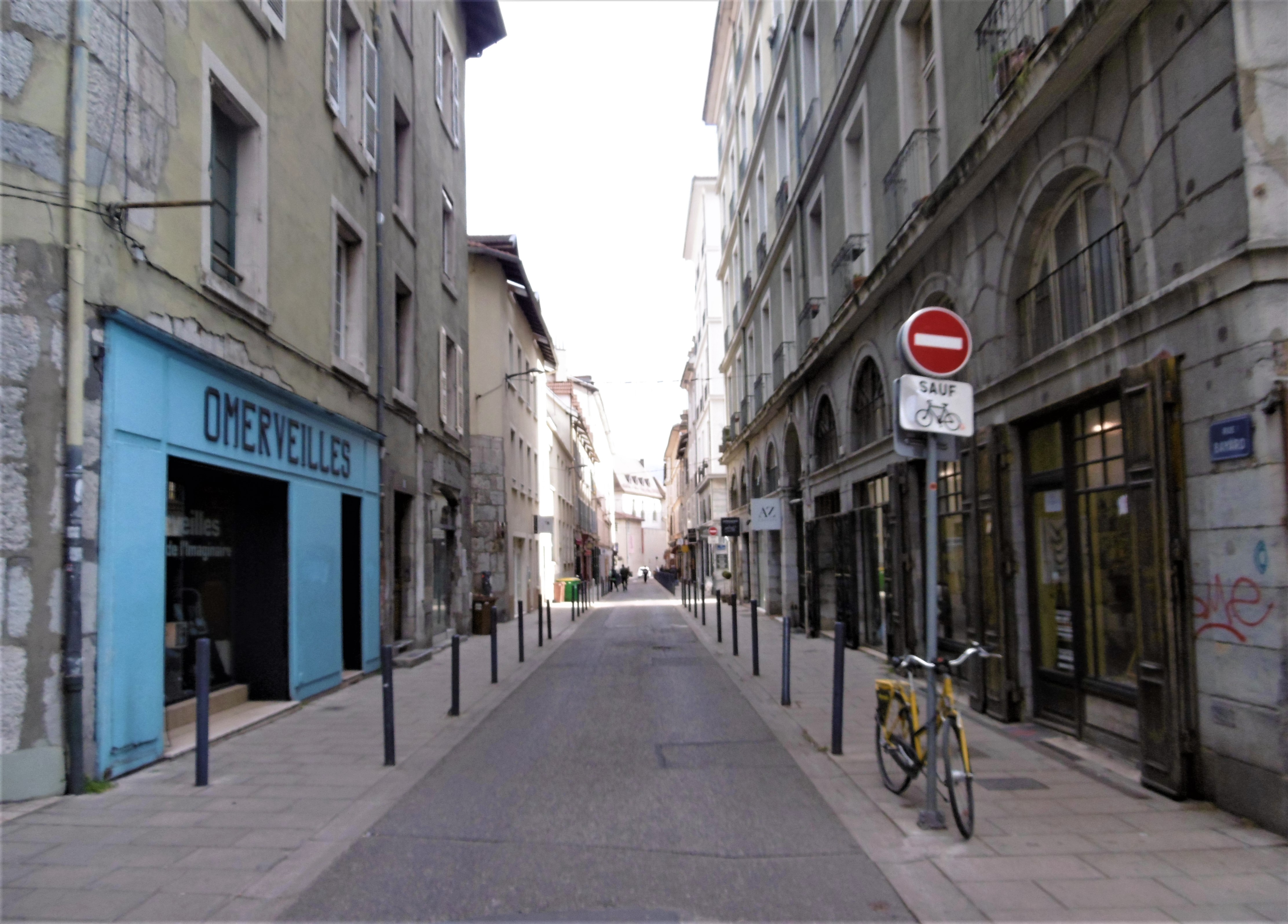
- Rue Bayard in April 2021
- Type: Street
- Location: Grenoble
- Quarter: Notre-Dame
- Coordinates: 45°11′29″N 5°43′56″E

Rue Bayard is a public road in the French commune of Grenoble. It is located in the Notre-Dame district, one of the liveliest districts of the city, redeveloped into a pedestrian zone.

== Location and access ==
=== Location ===
This road connects place Notre-Dame to rue Dominique Villars. It ends at the crossroads of rue Servan and rue Voltaire, at number 18 of the street, which then continues by rue Dominique Villars which leads to the Natural History Museum.

The street, included in the city's main commercial area, is accessible to passers-by from any point in the Notre-Dame district, the oldest in Grenoble.

=== Access ===
Rue Bayard is mainly served by line B of the Grenoble metropolitan area tram network. The closest station (located near the start of the street) is called Notre-Dame Musée de Grenoble.

== Origin of the name ==
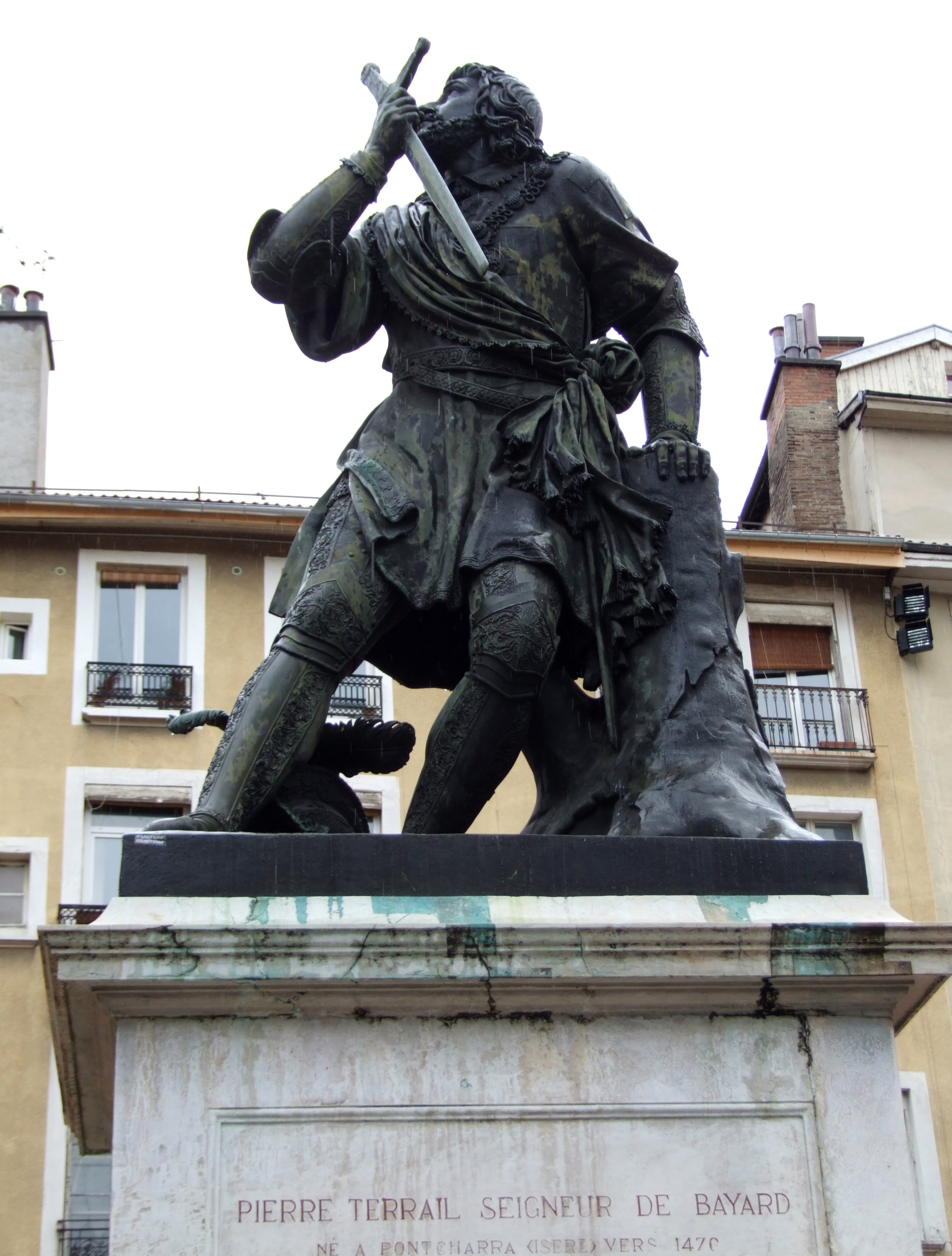
Statue of Knight Bayard in Grenoble.

This street received its name in honor of the « knight without fear and without reproach », Pierre Terrail, seigneur de Bayard (1476-1524), hero of the Italian Wars and native of Château Bayard in the commune of Pontcharra, located approximately thirty kilometers from Grenoble.

His body, brought back to Grenoble on May 20, 1524, after his death during a battle during the Sixth Italian War, was buried on August 24, 1524 in the chapel of the Minimes de la Plaine in Saint-Martin-d'Hères.

On July 4, 1822, the presumed remains of the knight Bayard were transferred to the church of the Saint-André collegiate church in Grenoble and in 1823, a statue was erected in his honor on the place Saint-André, located not far from rue Bayard.

== History ==
Rue Bayard was opened in 1791 through the jardin des Capucins, the allée des Marronniers and the cour du Doyenné de la cathédrale. During the revolutionary period it was called Rue de la Révolution. According to the historian Claude Muller, the knight Bayard lived in the area of this street at the time when it still housed the building of the Dean of the cathedral.

In 2021, rue Bayard, which has many businesses offering furniture and other antique items, belongs to the Antiques district of Grenoble with rue Voltaire, place des Tilleuls and rue Dominique Villars. Every year the street and the neighborhood hosts a flea market. The 2021 edition, organized on March 28, was called « Brocante, flavors and creations ».

== Remarkable buildings and places of memory ==
- Between N°3 and N°5: passage overlooking place des Tilleuls, former Place du Cloître Notre-Dame in the Middle Ages, before becoming Place des Tillots in 1694, then Place des Tilleuls in 1789. For a few months in 1794, the square became Place de la Convention. It then regained its name Place des Tilleuls, by deliberation of the municipal council dated October 9, 1857.
- N°13bis: main entrance to the Bayard institution, a private Catholic school and college of the Diocese of Grenoble-Vienne.
- N°17: Founded in 1931, the Bayard dairy marketed milk from farms in the Vercors, a mountainous massif which dominates the west of the Grenoble metropolitan area. Visitors can still choose their dairy products such as cheese but also their wines because the dairy also houses a cellar.

== In the arts ==
=== At the movie theater ===
In 2000, a scene from the film The Crimson Rivers, directed by Mathieu Kassovitz and released in 2000, was filmed inside the former museum-library on Place de Verdun.

== Bibliography ==
- Muller, Claude (1975). Grenoble, des rues et des hommes (in French) (Dardelet ed.). Grenoble. ISBN 2-900736-01-3.
- Dreyfus, Paul (1992). Les Rues de Grenoble (in French) (Glénat ed.). pp. 28–29. ISBN 9782723414340.
