= Félicien Wolff =

French organist and composer (1913–2012)

Félicien Georges Wolff was a French organist and composer, born 21 July 1913 in Elbeuf in Normandy and died on 16 February 2012.

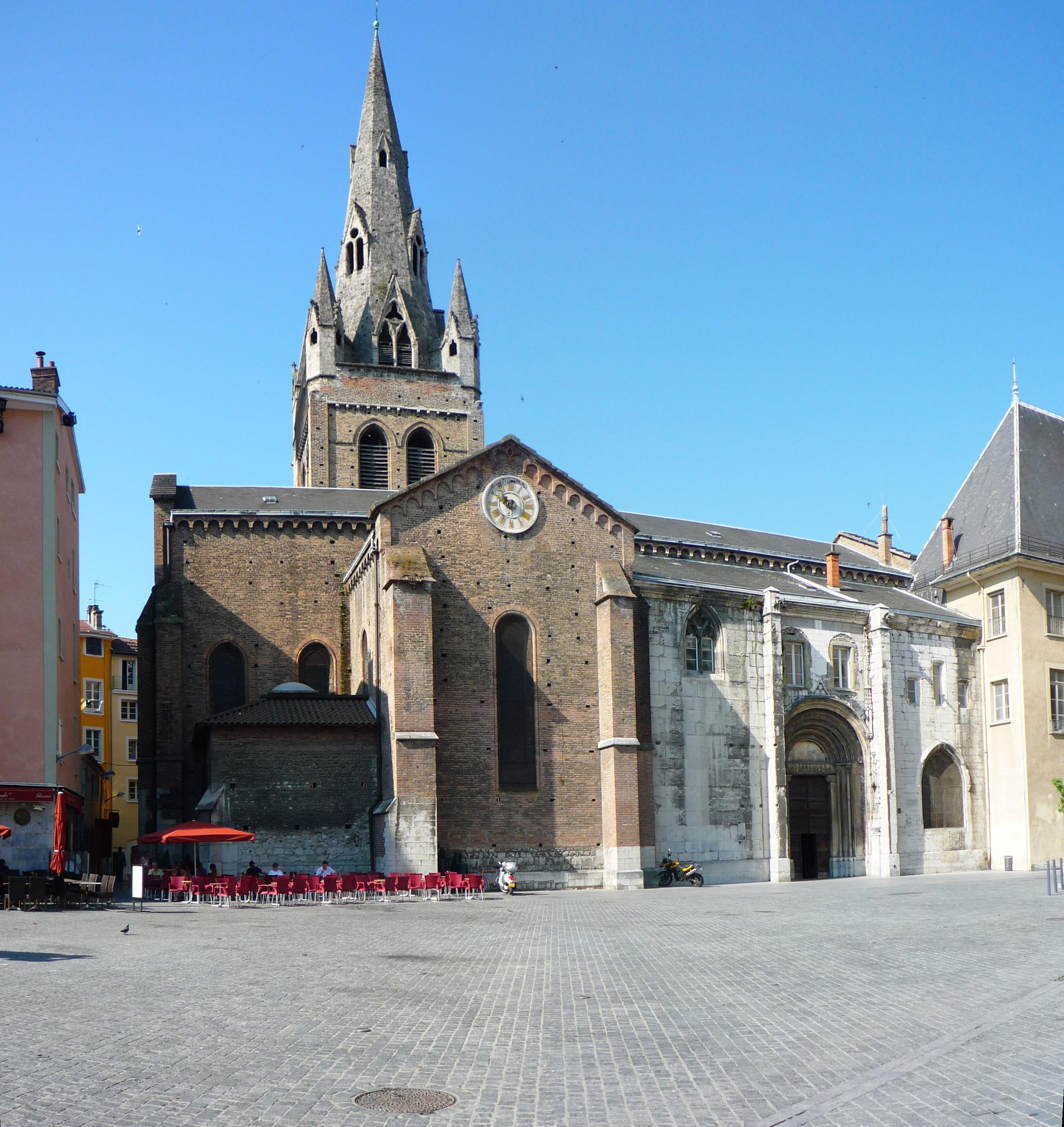
Collegiate Church of Saint-André, Grenoble

From 1930 to 1934, he was a student at the Paris Conservatory in the class of Paul Dukas (composition), Marcel Dupré (organ) and Maurice Emmanuel (music history). Around 1950, he was appointed professor of piano at the Conservatory of Grenoble, under the direction of Eric-Paul Stekel who strongly encouraged him in composition. The entirety of his work is published today in Delatour France. He was for more than thirty years titular organist of the Collegiate Church of Saint-André, Grenoble.

He died on 16 February 2012 at the age of 98 years.
