= Dinand =

Dinand is a surname. Notable people with the name include:

- Geneviève Dinand (1927–1987), French pianist
- Joseph N. Dinand (1869–1943), American Catholic bishop
