= Samson Scherrer =

Swiss organ builder (1698–1780)

Samson Scherrer (1698–1780) was an organ builder in the 18th century.

== Early life ==
Born August 6, 1698, he began working with his father. Scherrer's family, originally from Stein, in the canton of St. Gallen, Switzerland, were already organ builders of renown in the seventeenth and eighteenth centuries building instruments in Switzerland, Germany, France and Spain.

In 1726, the Council of Two Hundred in Bern authorized the return of the organs in the Protestant churches, which had been removed during the Reformation. This was an important market for Scherrer who moved to Bern from 1727 to 1732. He partnered with Emanuel Bossart for the construction of an organ of 33 plays and 3 keyboards, intended for the Church of the Holy Spirit. The finished the instrument in 1729, but the authorities refuse to buy it, having placed no orders. The partners separated and Scherrer borrowed to pay out Bossart.

== Career ==
In 1726 (Nov 19th) Samson Scherrer married Verena Anna Edelmann, born about 1706 in Wildhaus, Canton St. Gallen. They had six children: Anna Catherina (named in 1729); Georg Ludwig (baptised in 1731) who was also an organ builder; Jacob (born in Lausanne in 1733) who followed his father as an organ builder and organist; Samuel Samson, (baptised in Geneva in 1739); Suzanne Pernette, born in Geneva in 1740); Bernard Nicolas, born around 1747, probably in Grenoble, who was also an organ builder, organist, harpsichordist and composer.

In 1732, Samson Scherrer moved to Lausanne with his wife and children. He obtained permission to raise an organ at Lausanne Cathedral, but will be paid only thirty years later, in 1763. He then moved to Geneva, where the use of the organ was still banned in Protestant churches, so therefore sought work in France, and particularly in the Dauphiné region. He works at St. Gregory's Church in Tallard (1743), the Church of Saint-Louis (1746-1747) and the Collegiate Church of Saint-André (1748), both in Grenoble. He enlarged and modifies the organ of the Abbey of Saint-Antoine (1748) and Gap Cathedral (1749-1750), and he rebuilt the great organ and built the small organ of Embrun Cathedral (1750-1751); his only completely new construction is one of his greatest instruments in France, that in Valence Cathedral.

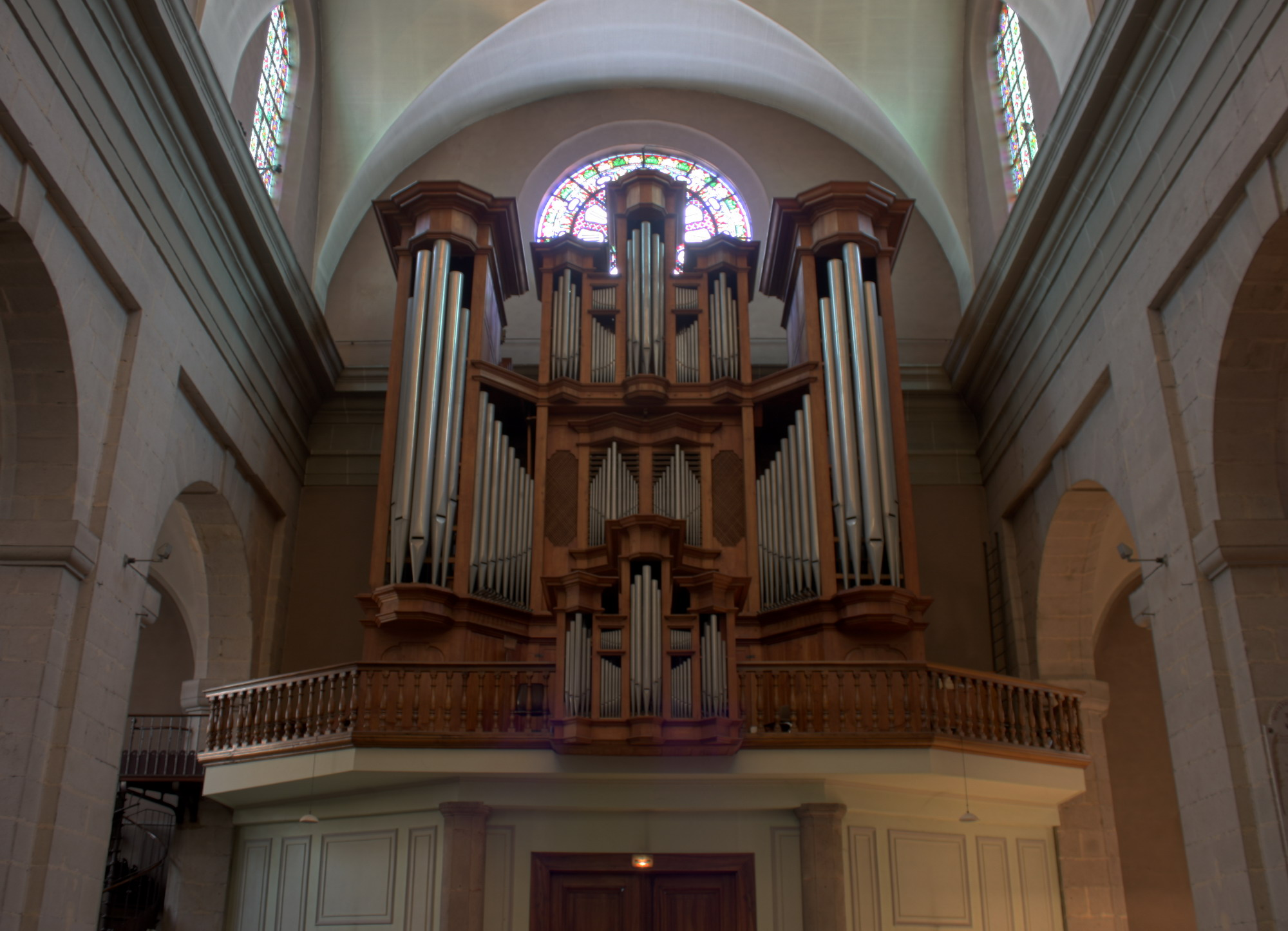
Church of Saint-Louis, Grenoble

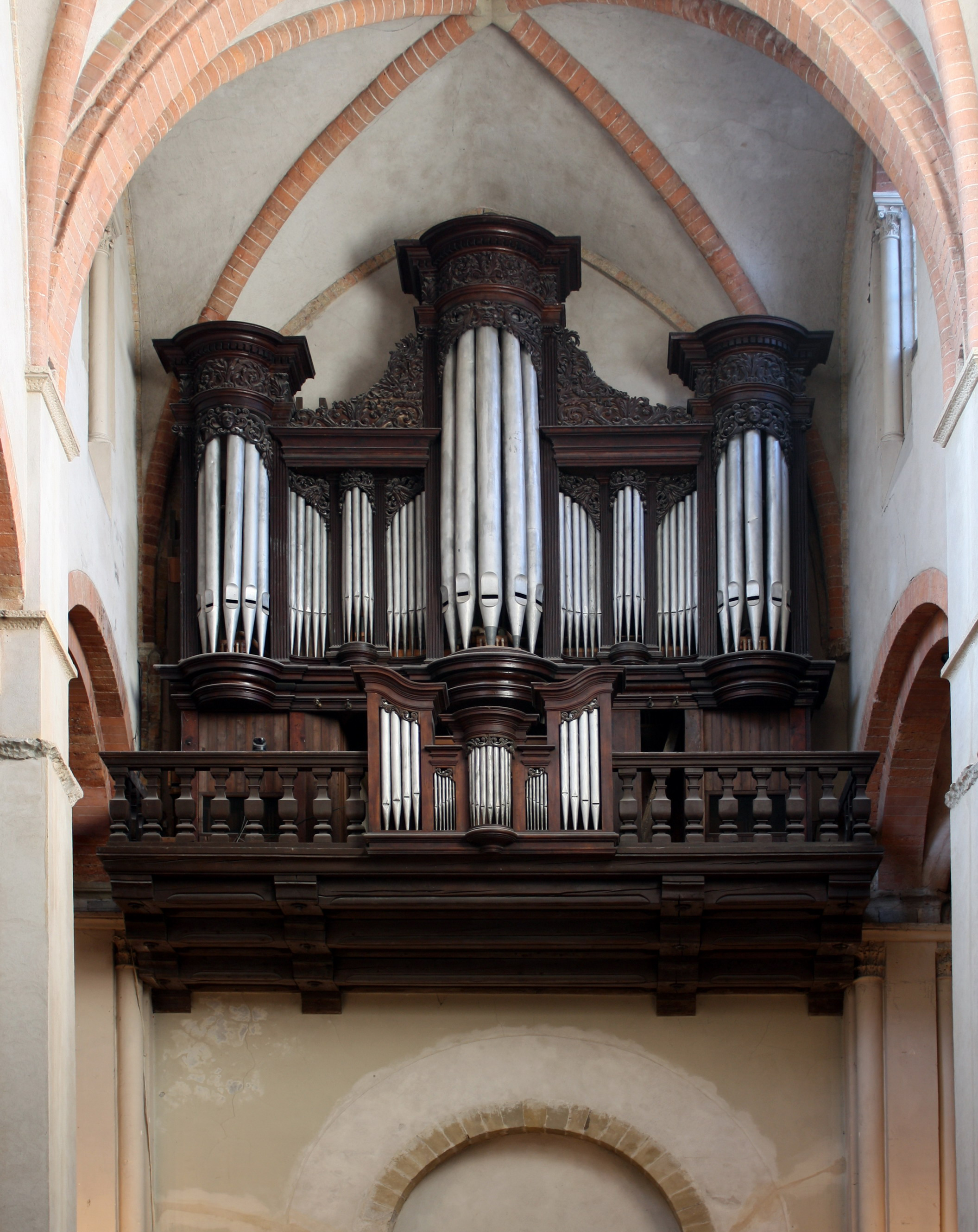
Grenoble Cathedral

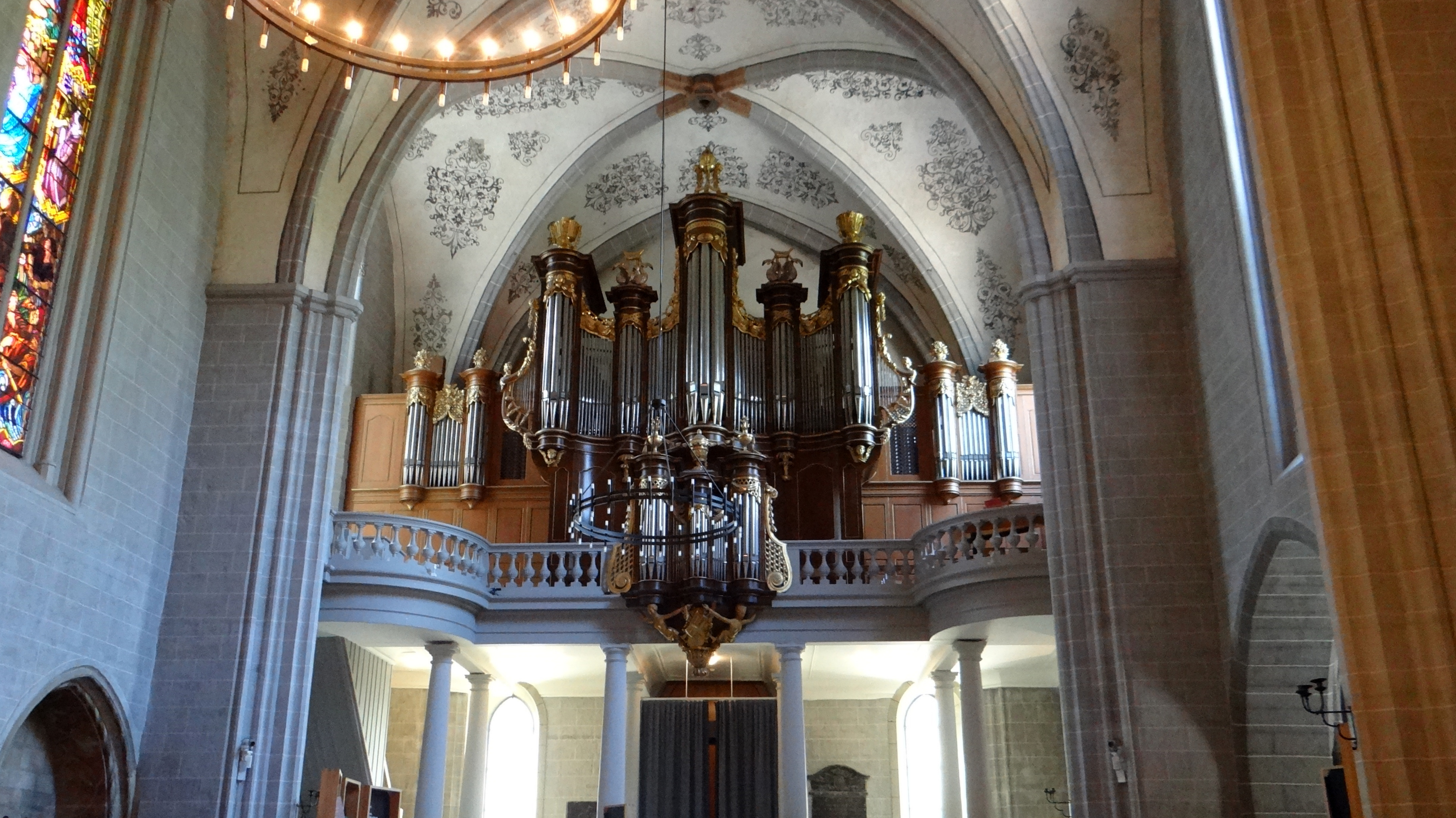
Church of Saint-François, Lausanne

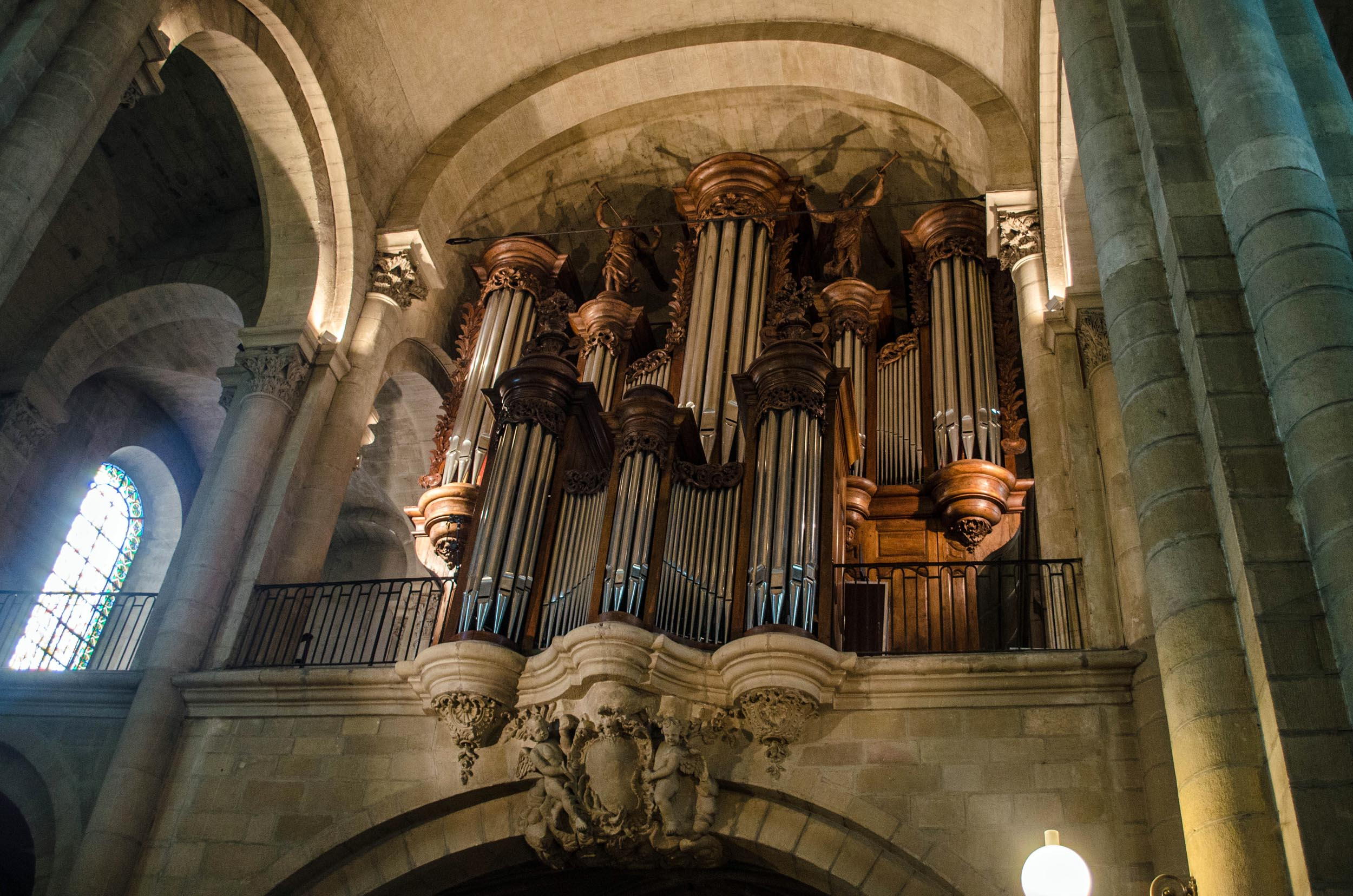
Organ of Valence Cathedral

In 1753, Samson Scherrer returned to Geneva, where the organ was now permitted to be used and offered his services to the authorities who commissioned an instrument for St. Peter's Church. The organ was completed in 1757, he added 4 games in 1767. This organ was destroyed in 1865. In 1762 & 1763 he built a new instrument for the temple Fusterie or Neuf temple which his son Nicolas will hold (destroyed in 1835). He also reconstructed the organ of the Auditorium in 1779. The yards are rare in Geneva, Samson also built as follows in the canton of Bern: Burgdorf 1759, Ursenbach 1760, Nidau 1761, Hindelbank 1770, Kirchberg 1771, Kirchenthurnen 1772 (the latter two buffets remain, more or less modified, while all the others have disappeared), Langenthal 1772, Schlosswil 1773; and in the canton of Vaud (all buffets being preserved, more or less modified): Avenches 1774, Vevey, Church of St Martin in 1776 (enlarged buffet), Lausanne, Church of St. Francis 1777 (buffet and watch), Morges, 1778, Vevey, Church of St Claire 1779, Nyon 1780.

Samson Scherrer died in Geneva on March 4, 1780, while still working on the organ at Nyon which was completed by his son Jean-Jacques and Nicolas and his companion Pierre Burkhard.
