= Flood of Grenoble (1219) =

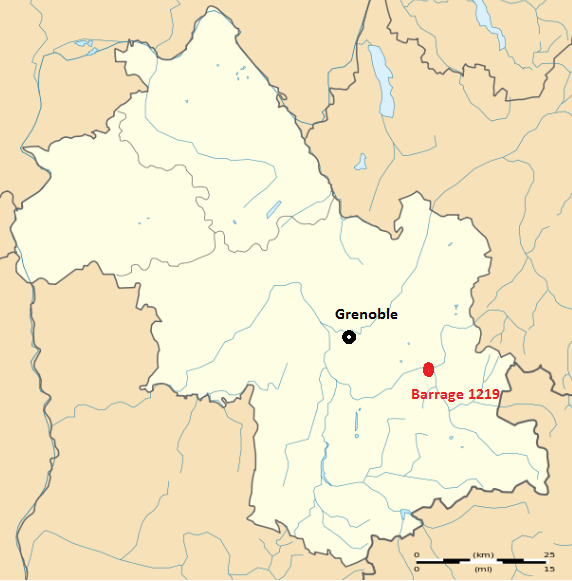
map of the barrage south east of Grenoble.

The flood of Grenoble in 1219 was a natural disaster that took place in the plain of Grenoble on the night of 14 to 15 September 1219. It happened from the rupture of a natural dam near the village of "Saint-Laurent-du-Lac. that had formed 28 years prior about 30 kilometers southeast of Grenoble, in the Romanch valley.

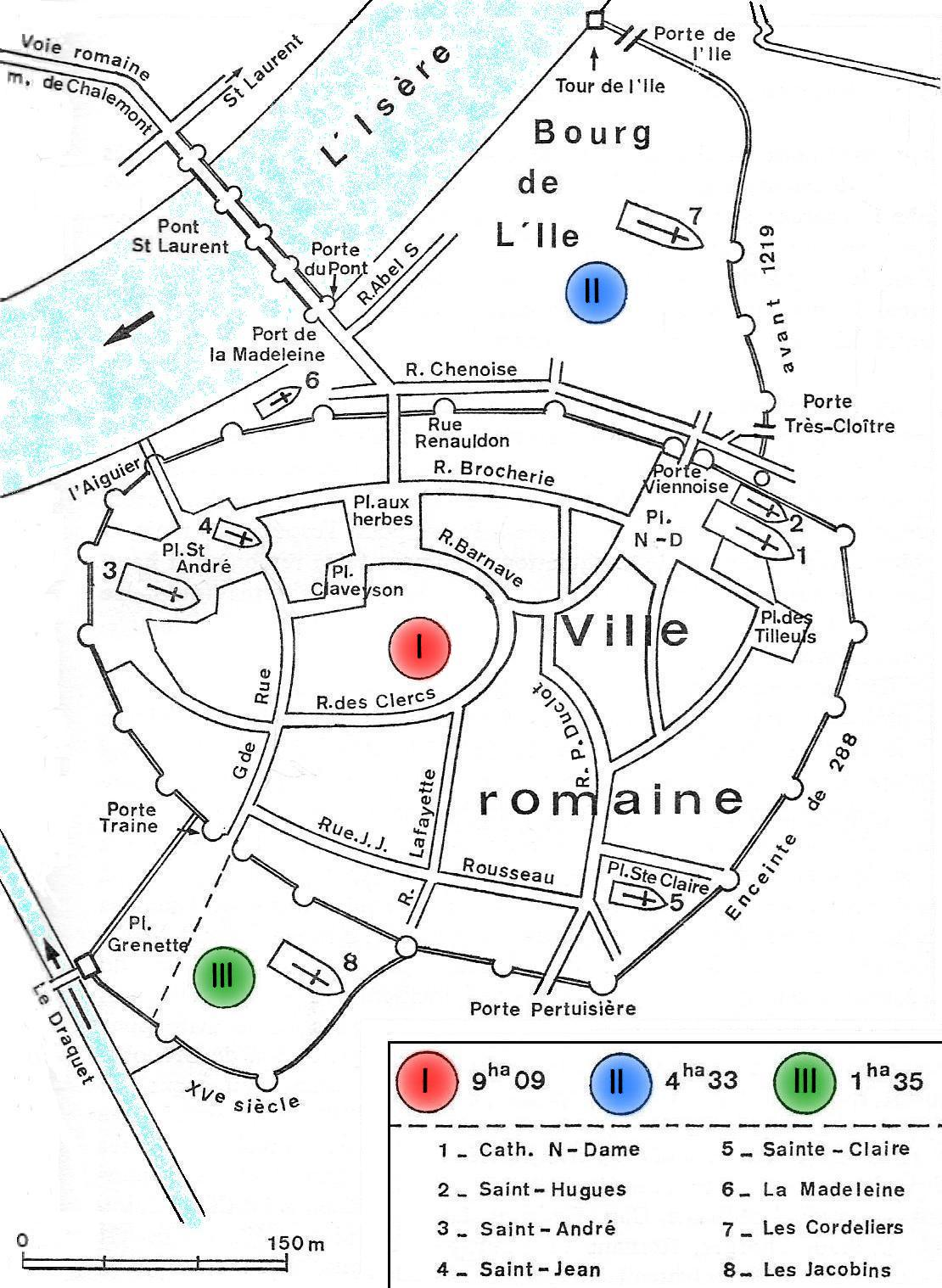
map of 13th century Grenoble.

The disaster ravaged the entire city of Grenoble, causing many deaths and triggering a struggle to control the two rivers crossing Grenoble, which was not complete until the early 19th century. In 1914, the geographer Raoul Blanchard described the disaster as "more furious flood that has [ever] beset the city" and explained the formation of the dam in an Alpine valley.

Modern estimates of the volume of water are between 15 million and about 66 million cubic meters.
