= Geneviève Dinand =

French pianist

Geneviève Dinand was a French pianist, born in Baugé on 10 August 1927, died in Bois-Colombes(Hauts-de-Seine) on 14 November 1987.

== Biography ==
Born in Baugé (Maine-et-Loire) in 1927, she was the great granddaughter of Leon Emile Allix (Doctor Victor Hugo) she married Jean-Pierre Eustache, flute teacher at the Conservatory of Grenoble.

Geneviève Dinand began piano at age 5 and entered the Paris Conservatory in 1946 in the class of the prestigious master Marcel Ciampi. Carrying a first prize in piano and music theory a medal, she managed to become the professor of piano competitions at the Conservatory of Grenoble.

She participated in three international piano competitions, reaching the finals on two of them. She left Grenoble to follow her husband to Paris, when he became flutist at the Paris Opera. She got a job at the Conservatory of Orleans as a piano teacher and a concert player in the city.

She died, shortly after retirement on 14 August 1987, of a brain tumor.
