= Rue Très-Cloîtres =

French street

Rue Très-Cloitres
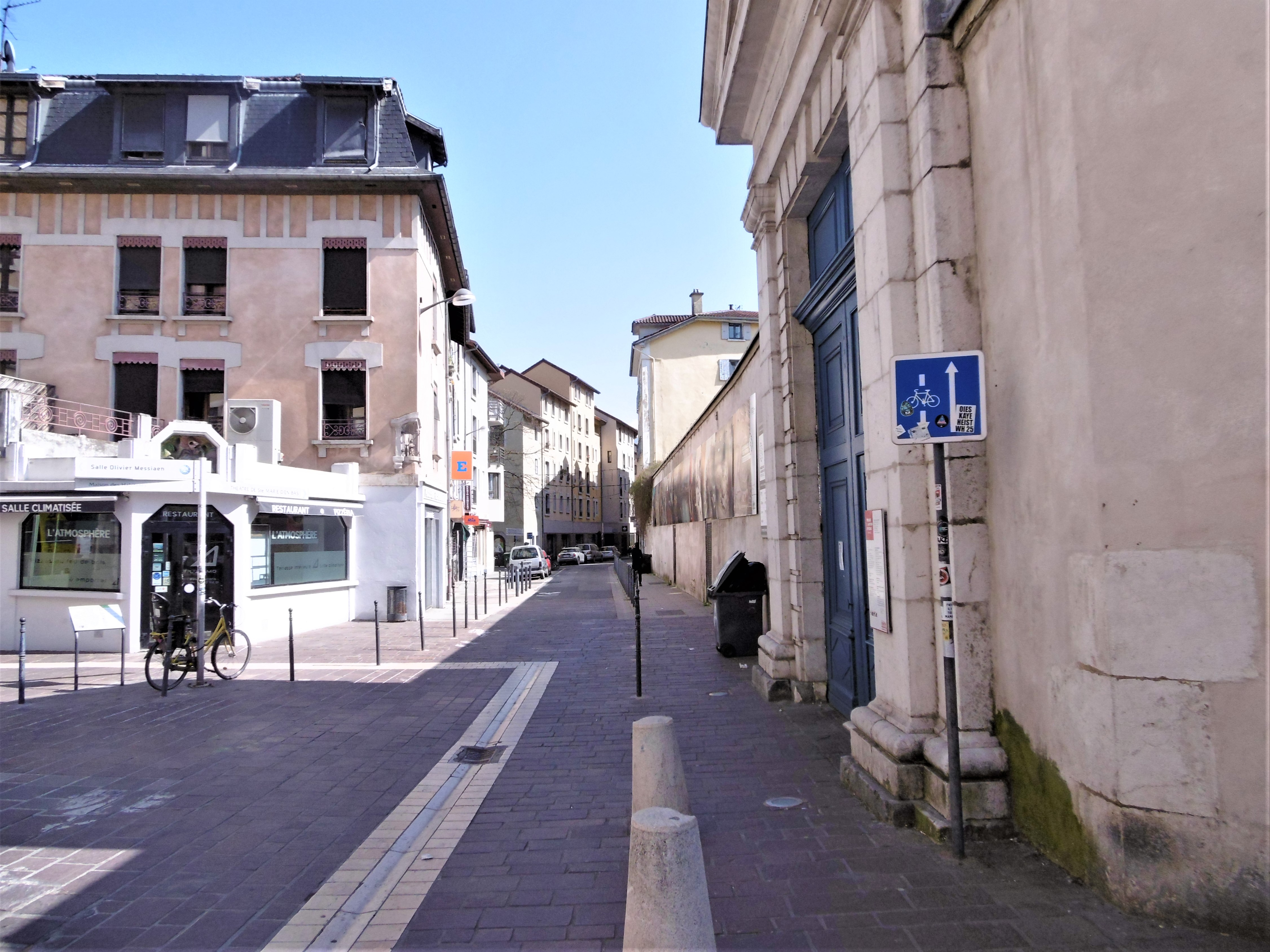
- Rue Très-Cloitres near the Musée de l’Ancien Évêché in April 2021
- Type: Street
- Location: Grenoble
- Coordinates: 45°11′32″N 5°44′02″W

Rue Très-Cloîtres is a public road in the French commune of Grenoble.

== Location and access ==
Located in the Notre Dame district. This street, open to automobile traffic, initially runs alongside the grounds of the Musée de l'Ancien Évêché, the main historical and archaeological museum in downtown Grenoble with the Musée dauphinois.

Rue Très-Cloîtres begins at Place Notre-Dame and rue Frédéric-Taulier (at the corner of the Musée de l'Ancien Évêché) and ends at Rue de l'Alma at N°58, along an axis northwest-southeast.

The street is mainly served by line B of the Grenoble metropolitan area tram network. The closest station (located less than two hundred meters) is called Notre-Dame-Musée. Bus lines 16 and 62 also serve the start of this street with the Notre-Dame-Musée stop.

== Origin of the name ==
Two theses have been put forward to explain the origin of the name of this street:

1. Due to its location outside the door of the Notre-Dame Cloister and would come from the term Trans-Claustra.
2. Due to the presence of three cloisters in the district: the Notre-Dame cloister, the Minimes cloister and the Visitation cloister.

It was for a long time called « Tra-Çlotra » or « Tra-Cloutra » street before becoming Très-Cloîtres.

== Remarkable buildings and places of memory ==
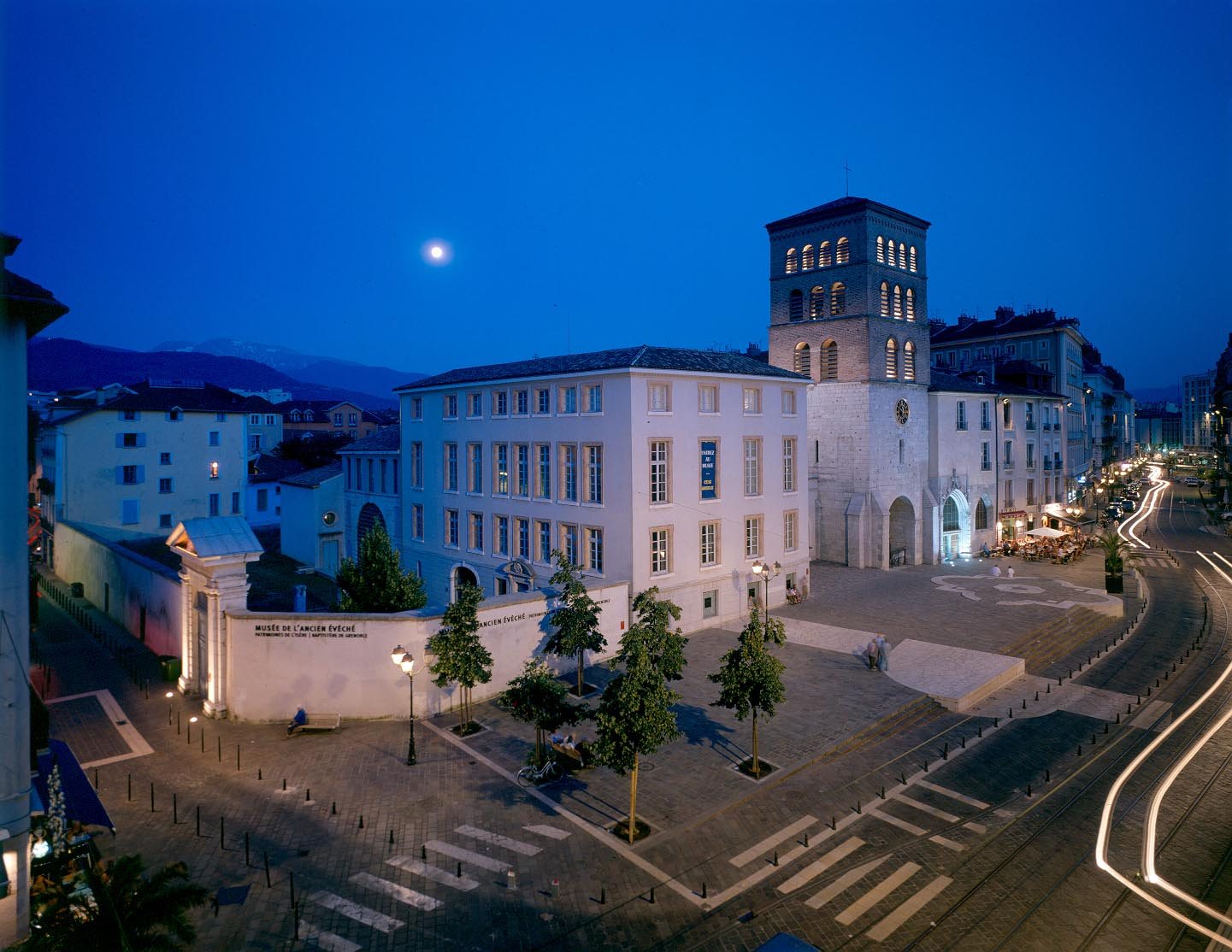
Musée de l'ancien Évêché, the rue Très-Cloitres, being located to the left of the picture

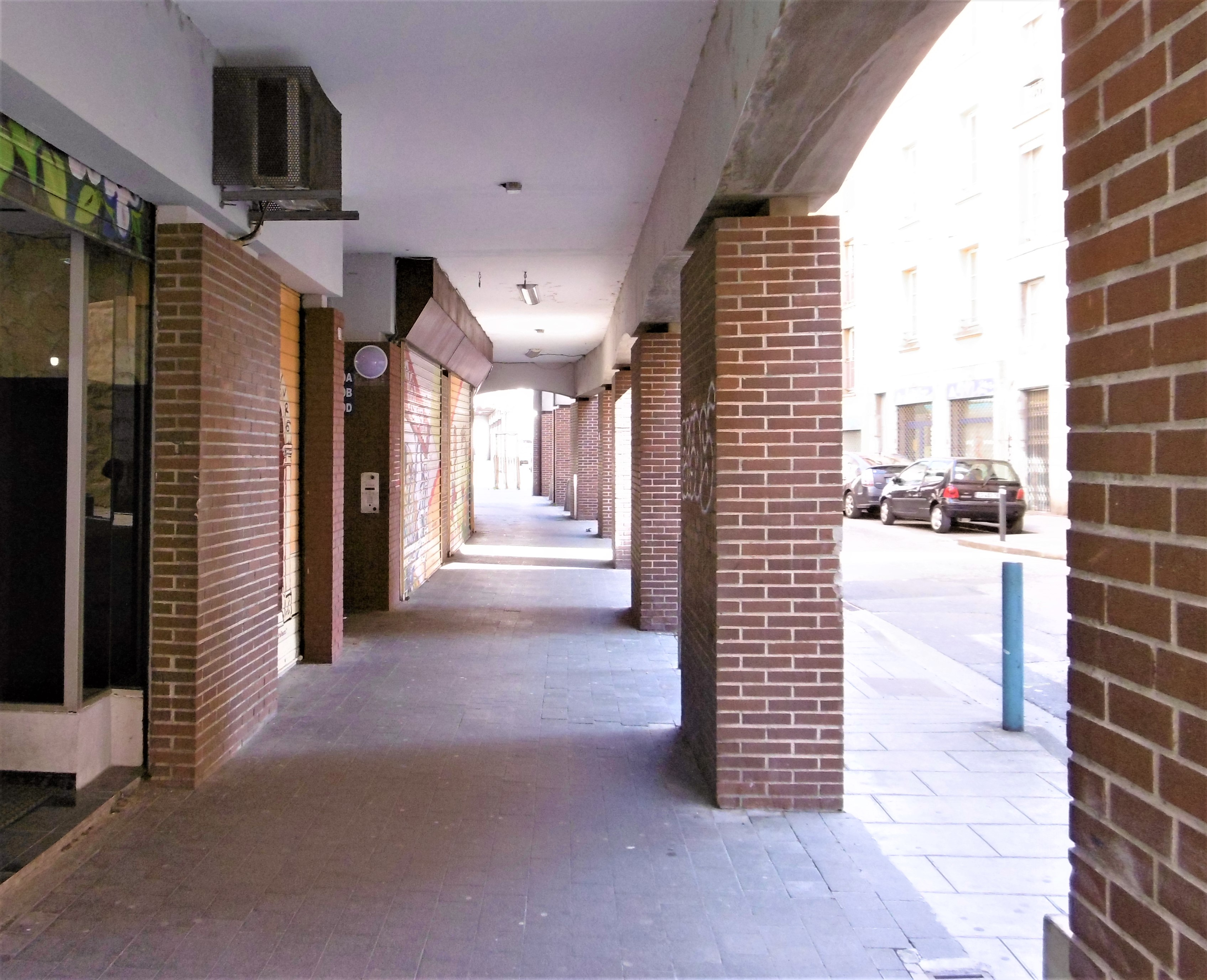
Arcades of rue Très-Cloitres

=== Demolished buildings ===
- The Porte Très-Cloitres, built in 1593 by the Duke of Lesdiguières and demolished in 1834, was located at the northern end of the street.

=== Existing buildings ===
- N°2. Musée de l'Ancien Évêché (former episcopal palace), dating from the 12th century and remodeled in the 17th century. Located between Notre-Dame, rue du Fer-à-Cheval and rue-Très-Cloîtres, the visitors' entrance is located at the corner that this street forms with Place Notre-Dame and opens onto a paved courtyard which also provides access to the Jardin de l'Évêché, a park open to the public.
- N°7. At the arcade level, the Café-école de la Paix is an associative site organizing philosophical meetings on current topics.
- N°38. Théâtre Sainte-Marie-d’en-Bas, former chapel of the Order of the Visitation whose construction dates from the mid-17th century. The building has been classified as a monument historique since April 18, 1988.

== Entertainment ==
The Très-Cloitres Mosaïque neighborhood association (AMAQ), founded in 2007 by residents, is behind the establishment of an olfactory and taste trail called « Chemin des senteurs ». This action was motivated by the desire to beautify this street and its neighborhood through urban gardening in public spaces.

== Bibliography ==
- Fonvieille, René (1968). Le vieux Grenoble (in French) (Roissard ed.). Grenoble.
- Muller, Claude (1975). Grenoble, des rues et des hommes (in French) (Dardelet ed.). Grenoble. ISBN 2-900736-01-3.
- Rousset, Henry (2010). Histoire illustrée des rues de Grenoble (in French). Editions des régionalismes. ISBN 9-782-846-187398.
- Dreyfus, Paul (1992). Rues de Grenoble : l'histoire illustrée des 815 rues (in French). Glénat. p. 256. ISBN 9782723414340.
- Bouchard, Gilbert (2006). Les rues de Grenoble (in French) (Glénat ed.). Grenoble. ISBN 2-7234-5163-1.
