= Place de Verdun, Grenoble =

French Town Square

Place de Verdun
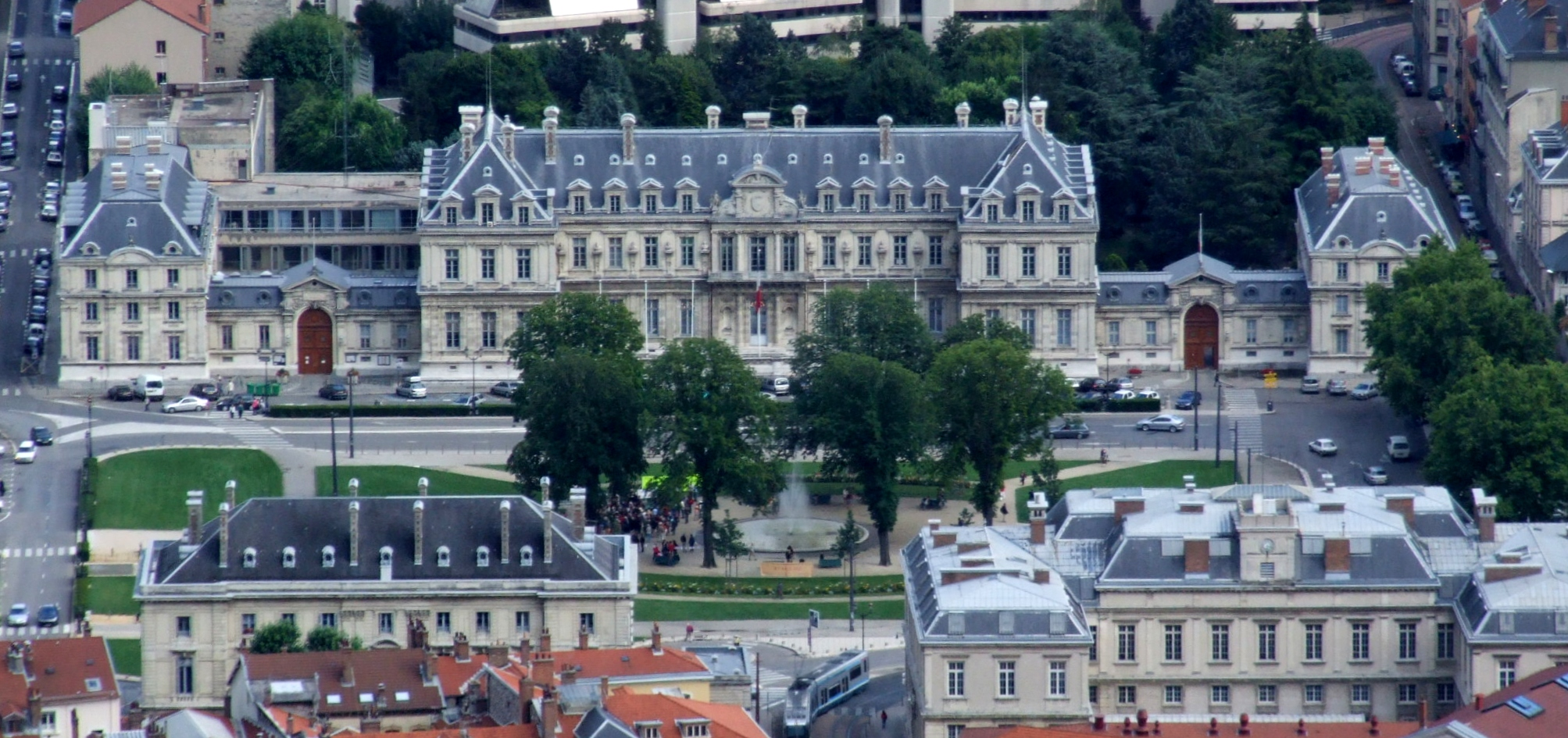
- Place de Verdun and the Isère prefecture hotel
- Type: Town square
- Location: Grenoble
- Coordinates: 45°11′20″N 5°43′55″E

Place de Verdun (French pronunciation: [plas də vɛʁdœ̃]) is a public square in the French commune of Grenoble in the French department of Isère, in the Auvergne-Rhône-Alpes region.

== Location and access ==
This vast square, located in the hyper-center district, notably houses the Isère prefecture hotel, the building of the former musée-bibliothèque de Grenoble and the hôtel des troupes de montagne de Grenoble.

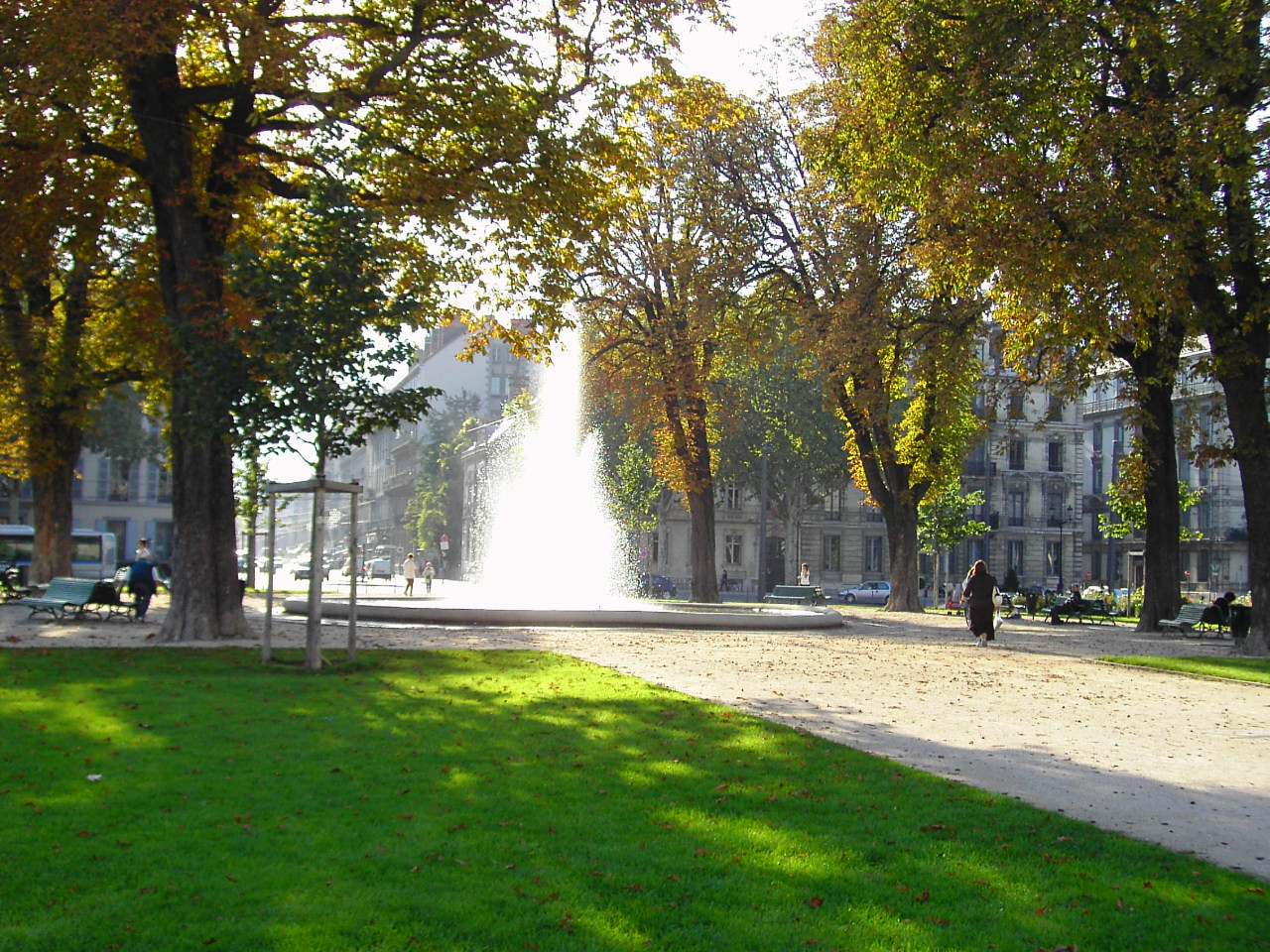
Center of the square and rue Lesdiguières in the background.

Starting from the north, and going clockwise, Place de Verdun provides access to the following routes, according to the toponymic references provided by the geoportal site of the National Geographic Institute:

- North: rue Général Marchand
- North-east: rue Général Beylié / rue Cornélie Gémond
- East: rue Hébert
- South-east: rue Mably / rue Eugène Faure
- South-west: rue Fantin-Latour / rue Beyle-Stendhal
- West: rue Lesdiguières
- North-west: rue de la Liberté / rue Marcel Benoit

The square, located in the hyper-center Grenoble district, near the Exposition-Bajatière district, is accessible to passers-by from any point in the city.

Public transport

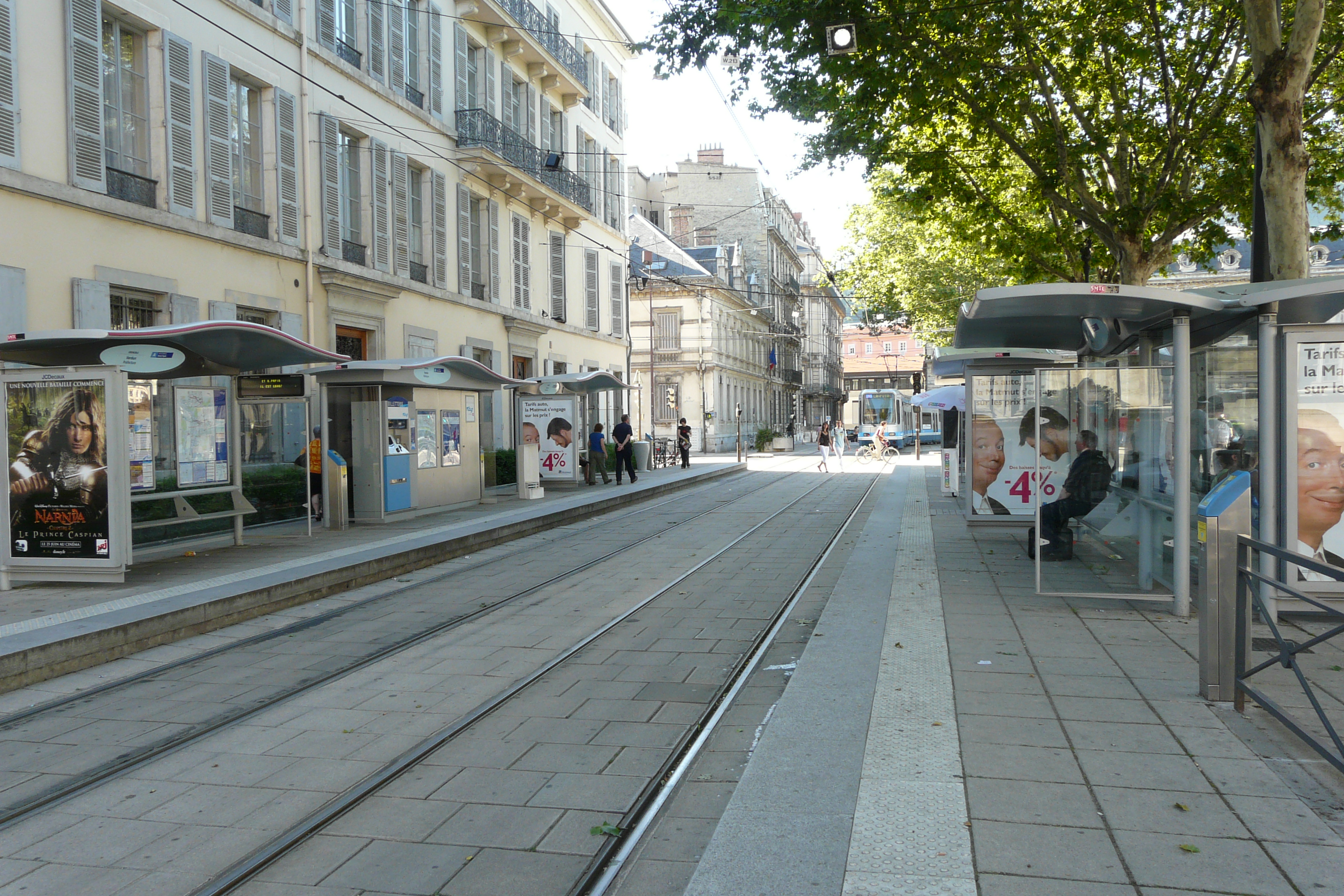
"Verdun-Préfecture" tram station

The square is directly served by line A of the Grenoble metropolitan area tram network with a station located to the southwest of the square: Verdun - Préfecture. The place is also served by numerous bus lines (Proximo lines 12, 13, 14), as well as by the Transisère line 6020 (Verdun-Préfecture stop).

== Description ==
This square, surrounded by monumental buildings dating, for the most part, from the end of the 19th century, forms a square of 150 meters on each side, sheltering a square with a basin equipped with a water jet in its center. The place also houses an underground car park, the entrance to which is located on the north side. The tram line runs along this square between rue Général Marchand (to the north) and rue Fantin-Latour (to the south).

== Origin of the name ==
The Place de Verdun was named by this name in 1918, in memory of the Battle of Verdun which took place from February 21 to December 18, 1916 in the Verdun region in Lorraine, during the First World War.

== History ==
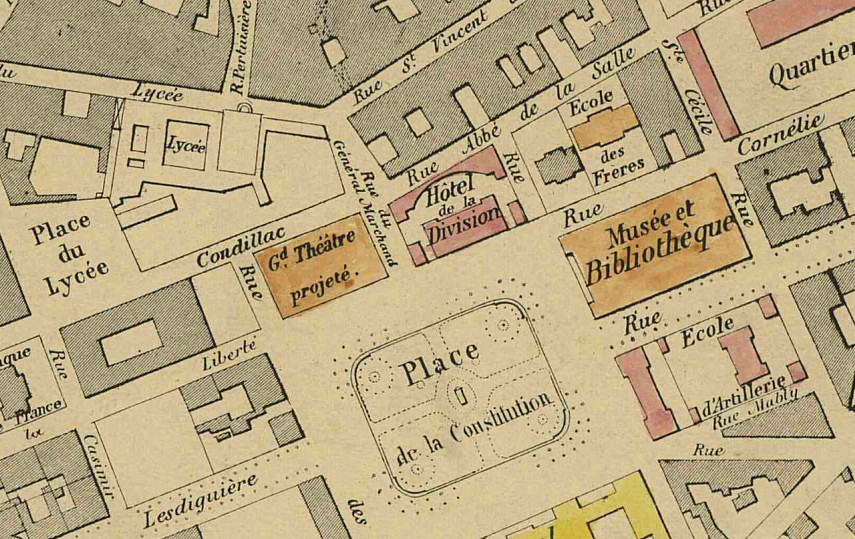
Place de la Constitution on the 1869 map of Grenoble

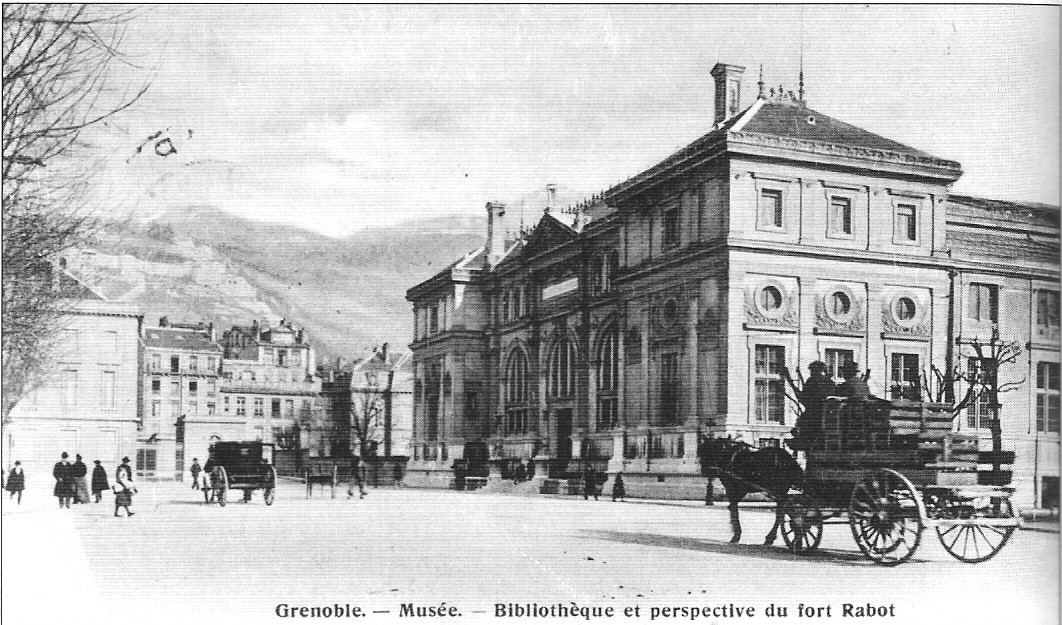
Place de la Constitution and the museum-library in 1895

Originally, the Place de Verdun was called the « Place d’Armes » because it hosted the city’s main military parades. It was designed in the 1840s on the site of a former bastion of the Lesdiguières fortifications. The prefecture was completed in 1867. At the start of the Third Republic (in 1870) it changed its name to « Place de la Constitution ». In 1885, a banker built a private mansion which would become the current administrative court.

The statue of Napoleon on his horse, made by Emmanuel Frémiet, was inaugurated on the square in 1868 then dismantled in 1870, under the Third Republic before being reinstalled near lac de Laffrey (site of the Laffrey prairie). To replace it, the statue called « Le Torrent » by Urbain Basset was installed. This will, in turn, be moved to the Jardin de Ville. A pool will be installed at this location.

== Remarkable buildings and places of memory ==
Below is the list of buildings on the square, most of them for public purposes in order of number:

- N°1: the IUT2 building in Grenoble, Grenoble-Verdun site (business and administration management department) belongs to the University of Grenoble. It occupies the building of the former Faculty of Law, Sciences and Letters inaugurated on December 8, 1879.
- N°2: the administrative tribunal of Grenoble, installed since 1972 in the private mansion built towards the end of the 19th century by the Grenoble banker Nicollet.
- N°5: the Hôtel des troupes de montagne de Grenoble is spread over three levels and was designed by the architect Jean-François Delarue. This building, which houses the 27th mountain infantry brigade, replaced the former Governor's Hotel built during the ancien Régime.
- N°7: the entrance to the parking lot located in the basement.
- N°9: musée-bibliothèque de Grenoble: the building, which housed the municipal library until 1970 and the museum collections until 1993, was designed by the architect Questel in a neo-Renaissance style. It was inaugurated in 1872 after several years of work interrupted by the Franco-German war of 1870. The main facade, on the Place de Verdun, is decorated with six sculptures protected in niches and created by the Grenoble sculptor Henri Blanc-Fontaine. These represent on the left side the allegories of Painting, Architecture and Sculpture and on the right side, the allegories of Poetry, Science and History.
- N°12: the Isère prefecture hotel occupies the entire south side of the square. Its facade, overlooking the square, presents busts sculpted for the most part by Aimé Charles Irvoy in homage to numerous historical figures from Dauphiné.
Some photos of the remarkable buildings on Place de Verdun

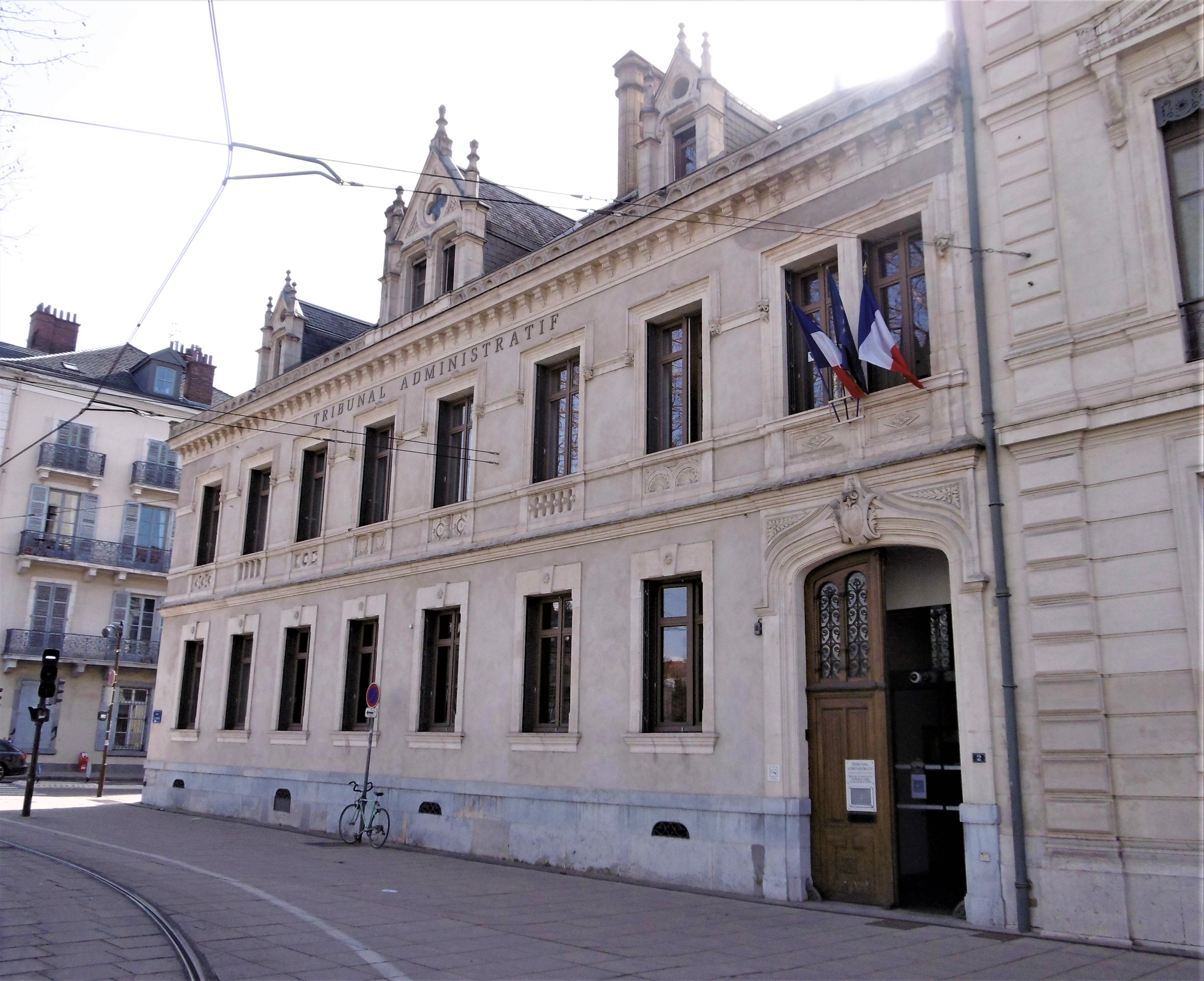
Administrative tribunal of Grenoble

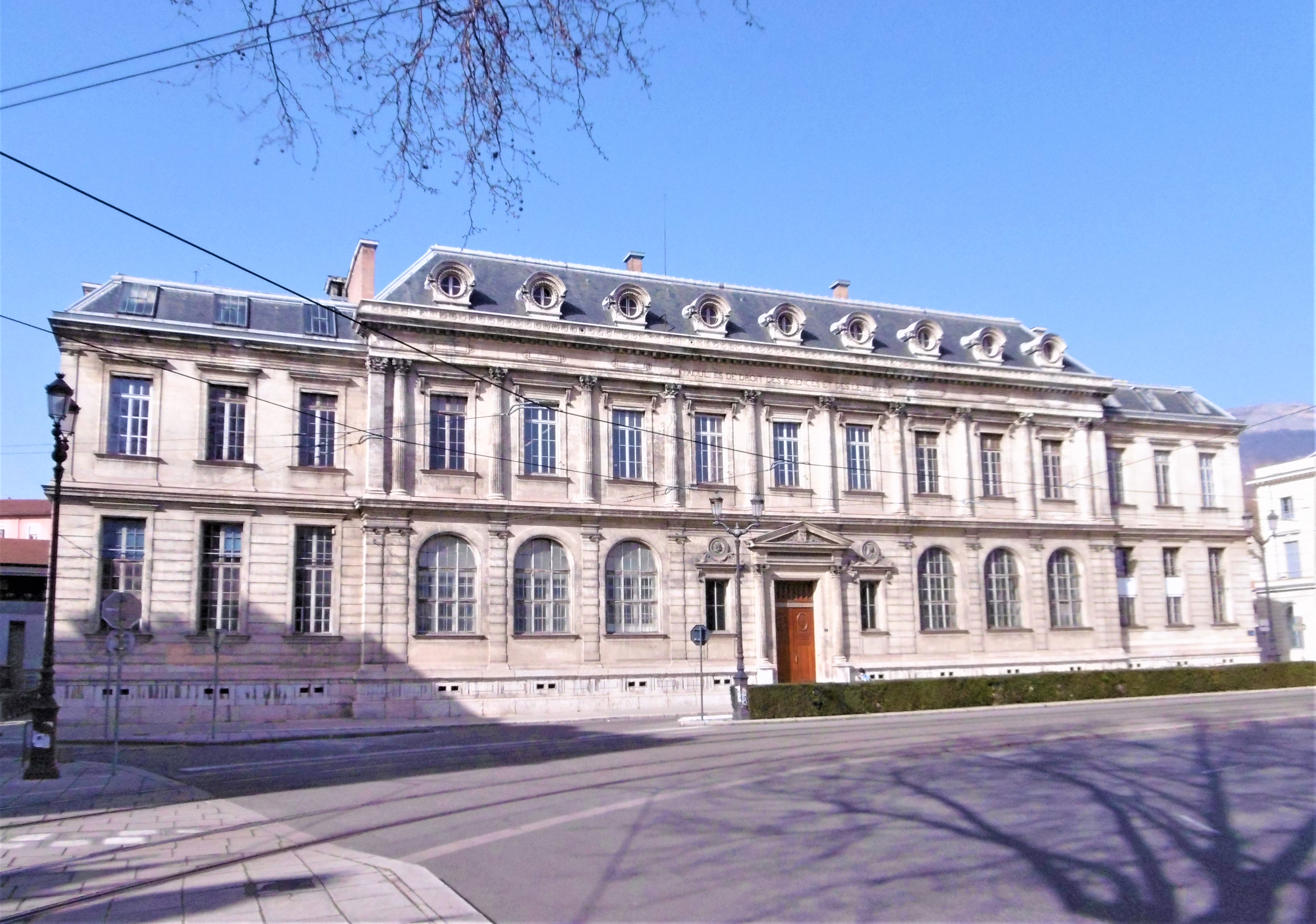
IUT2 university building

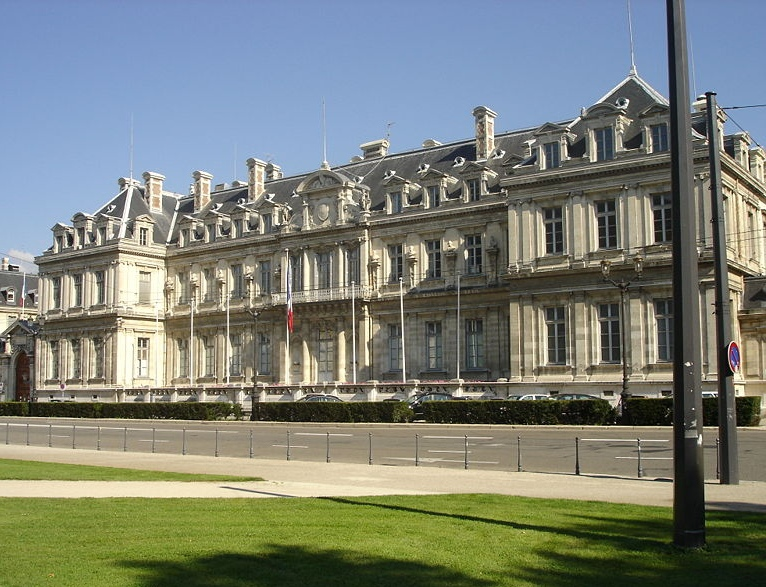
Isère prefecture hotel

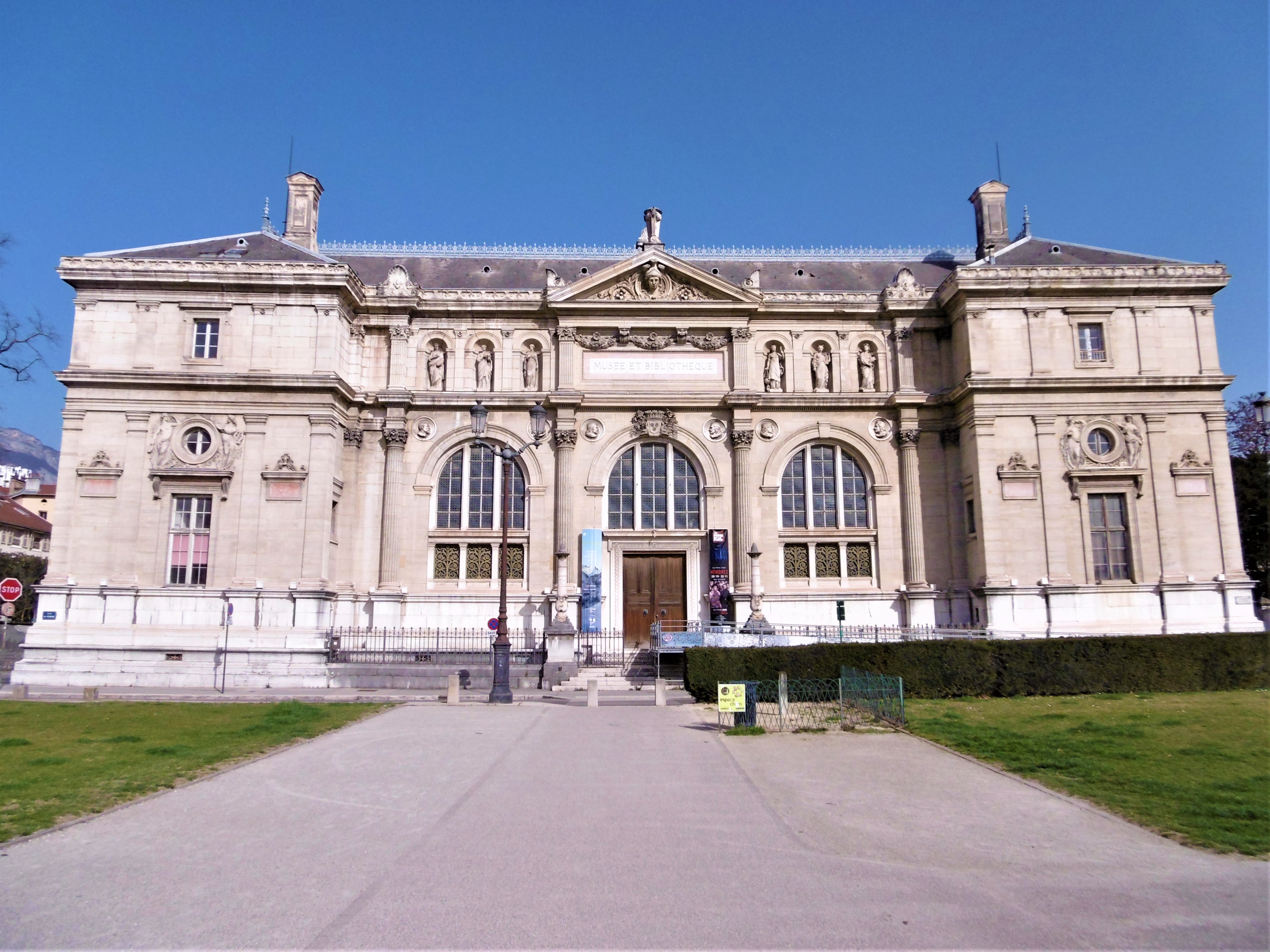
Former museum-library

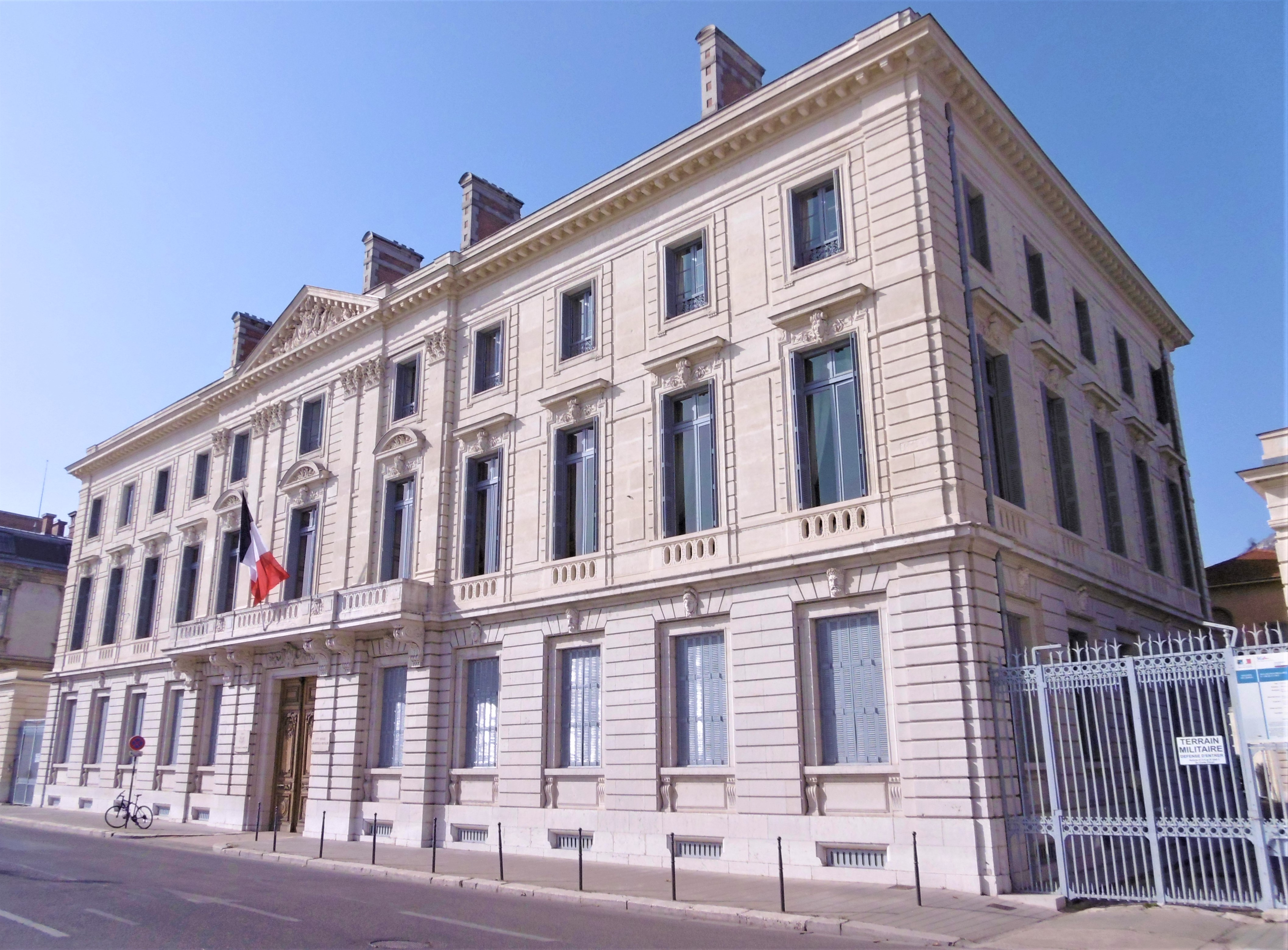
Hôtel des troupes de montagne

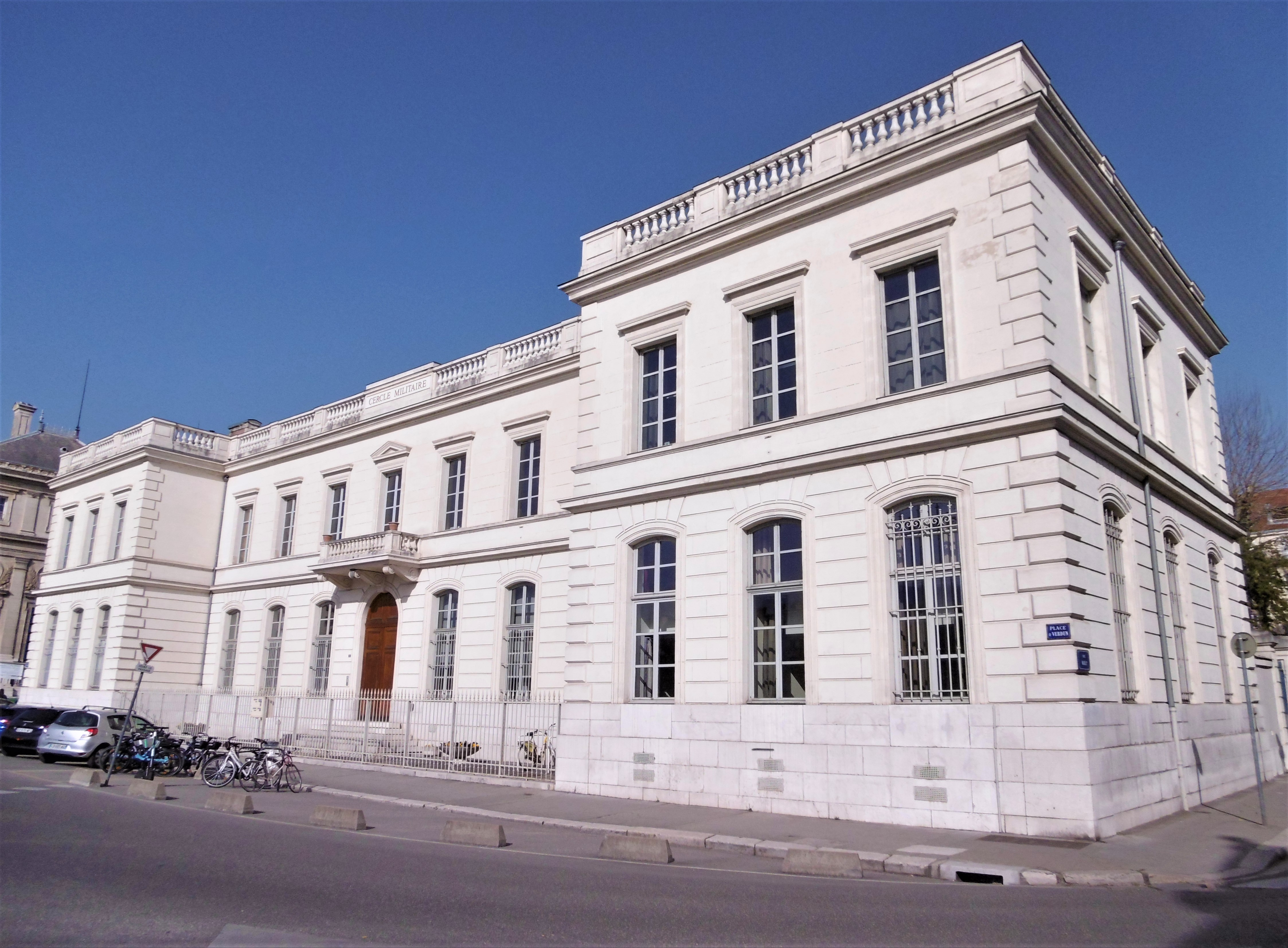
Former Officers' Mess Building

== Bibliography ==
- Rousset, Henry; Brichet, Édouard (1982). Histoire illustrée des rues de Grenoble (in French). Editions des régionalismes. p. 142. ISBN 9-782-846-187398.
- Dreyfus, Paul (1992). Les Rues de Grenoble : l'histoire illustrée des 815 rues (in French). Glénat. pp. 266–267. ISBN 9782723414340.
