= Conservatoire de Grenoble =

Coordinates: 45.1733°N 5.7347°E

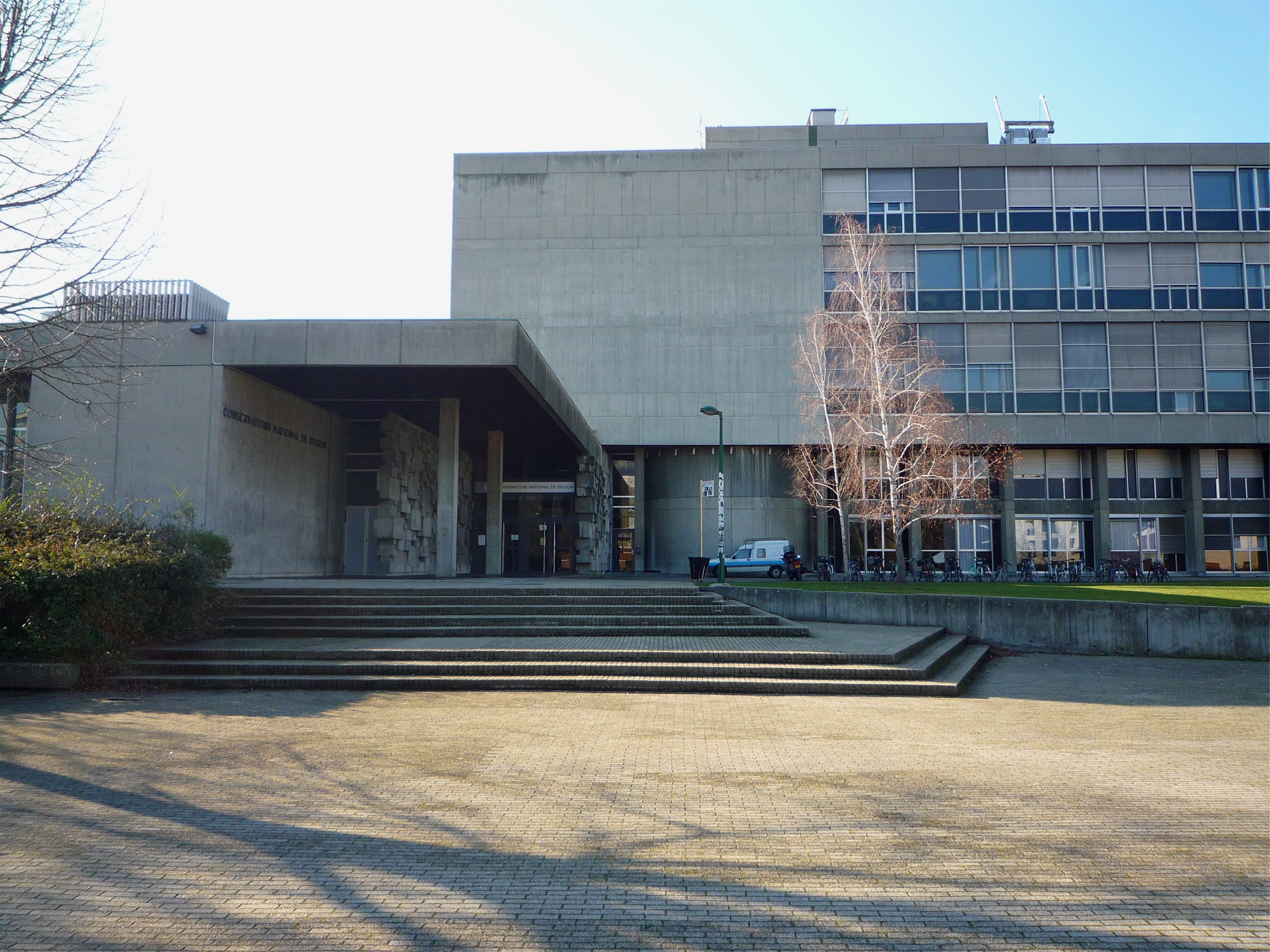
Conservatoire de Grenoble.

The Conservatoire de Grenoble, in French Conservatoire à rayonnement régional de Grenoble, is a chartered artistic institution controlled by the Ministry of Culture and Communication, represented by the Regional Directorate of cultural Affairs (DRAC). The conservatory is located at 6, Chemin de Gordes 38100 Grenoble, France. The institute offers three specialties, music, dance and drama.

The building is installed close to the MC2. Since 2003, the building is labeled "Heritage of the 20th century" in Grenoble.

== History ==
Teaching music in Grenoble dates back to 20 December 1787, when Mr. Garnier established a music school under the authority of the magistrates of the city, including Mayen, First Consul of the city. Students paid in advance the sum of 24 pounds for three months, 96 pounds for the entire year.

The year 1836 saw the creation of a vocal music classes at the vocational school and that of instrumental music lessons from 1883. At that time, the music companies abound in Grenoble as Orphéon founded in 1860 or Echo of the Alps, and not counting the military bands of the garrison troops. However, several projects to create a conservatory fail between 1871 and 1907. In 1907, the municipality of Charles Rivail is working to contact a dozen French cities with a questionnaire on how their music school. It was not until 1922 to see the creation of a music school in Grenoble in the premises of the post academic professional association (apps).

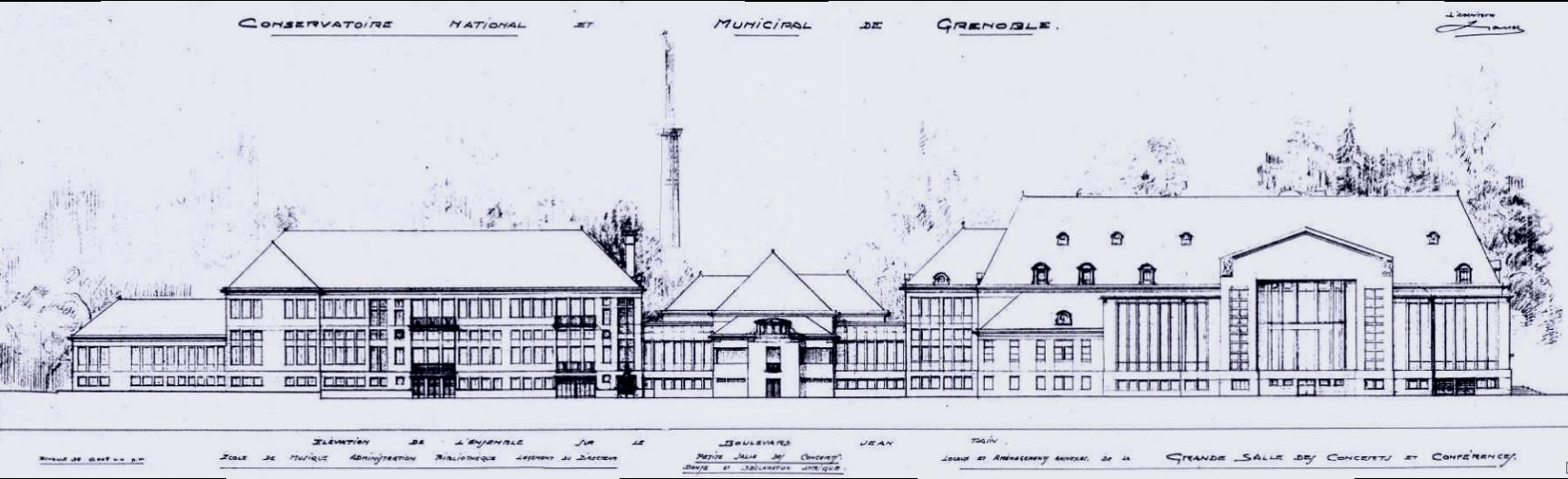
First plans in Paul Mistral Park (1953).

It's in its meeting of 23 November 1935, the City Council approved the institution's status and moved it to 11 Millet Street and made it a municipal conservatory. At the time, in the spirit of the new Municipality institution it provided the city with an organization capable of giving to the art of music and character development that can ensure a simple music school . The school moved tentatively April 21, 1939 in Hotel Majestic dependent building at 1, rue de Palanka with an installation of 20,000 francs budget, but the school closed during part of World War II.

=== Directors of the Conservatory ===
- Edinger
- Eric-Paul Stekel until 1969
- André Lodéon
- Bernard Commandeur
- Michel Rotterdam (1997–2007)
- Emmanuel Cury until 2011
- Thierry Müller
