= Alexandre Debelle =

French painter (1805–1897)

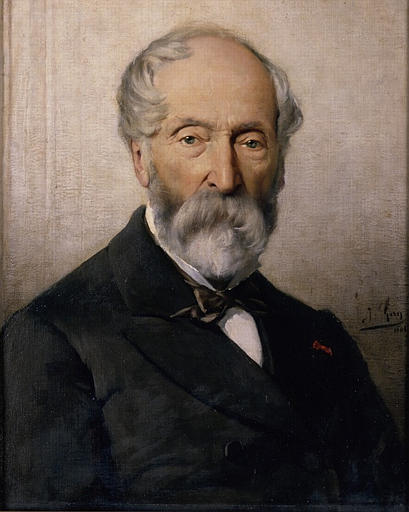
Alexandre Debelle; portrait by Jacques Gay (1881)

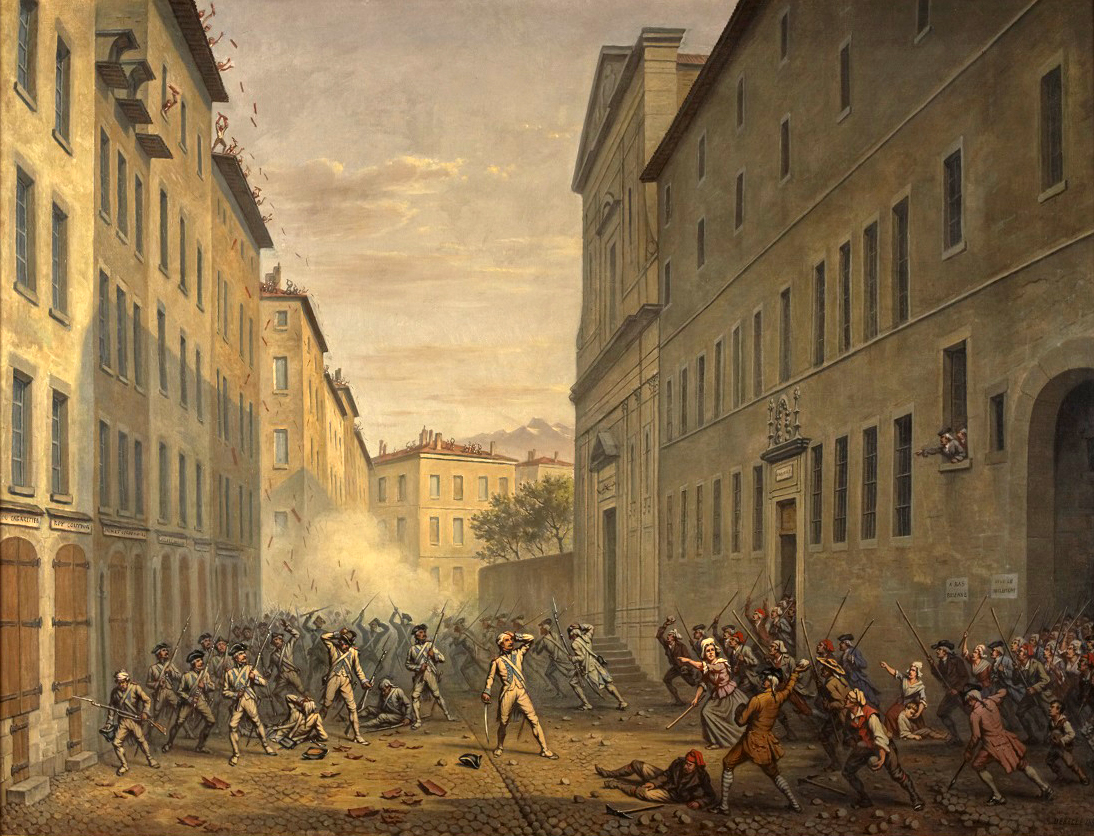
Day of the Tiles (1890)

Alexandre Joseph Michel François Debelle (French pronunciation: [alɛksɑ̃dʁ(ə) ʒozɛf miʃɛl fʁɑ̃swa dəbɛl]; 21 December 1805 in Voreppe – 22 July 1897 in Grenoble) was a French painter, designer and lithographer.

== Biography ==
He was born into a noble military family. His father, Joseph Guillaume Debelle (1779-1816), was a captain in the Grande Armée. After 1816, Alexandre was raised by his uncle, César Alexandre Debelle (Baron de Gachetière), who became his guardian.

He originally studied law at the University of Grenoble. In 1830, he decided that he would rather be an artist and studied with Benjamin Rolland, Curator of art at the Museum of Grenoble. Originally a landscape artist, he devoted himself to natural scenes, with and without structures, from throughout the Dauphiné. He later published a four-volume album of lithographs as a tourist guide to the area.

In addition to his early studies, he also worked with Antoine-Jean Gros and Camille Roqueplan but, in 1832, failed to qualify for admission to the École des Beaux-Arts in Paris. He returned home and exhibited at the Salon there. Finally, in 1837, he was able to exhibit at the Louvre and moved back to Paris, where he continued to exhibit until 1848. After 1839, he switched mostly to history painting; primarily scenes from the Revolutionary period. These would become his best-known works.

In 1853, upon Rolland's retirement, he was appointed Curator at the Museum of Grenoble and remained there until 1887, when he was eighty-two years old. While there, he promoted the work of local artists; including Jacques Gay, Jean Achard, Henri Blanc-Fontaine, Diodore Rahoult and Théodore Ravanat. In the 1860s, he was able to travel extensively throughout the Mediterranean region, producing several paintings of North Africa. From 1870 to 1872, he and librarian Hyacinthe Gariel organized the museum's move to a new building, designed by Charles-Auguste Questel (now known as the Musée-bibliothèque de Grenoble).
