= Ernest Victor Hareux =

French painter (1847–1909)

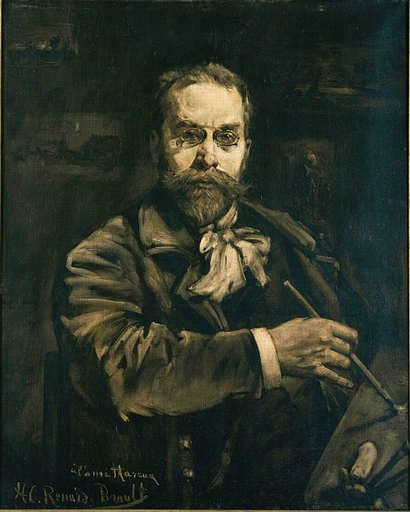
Ernest Victor Hareux (1890s); by Henri-Constantin Renard-Brault

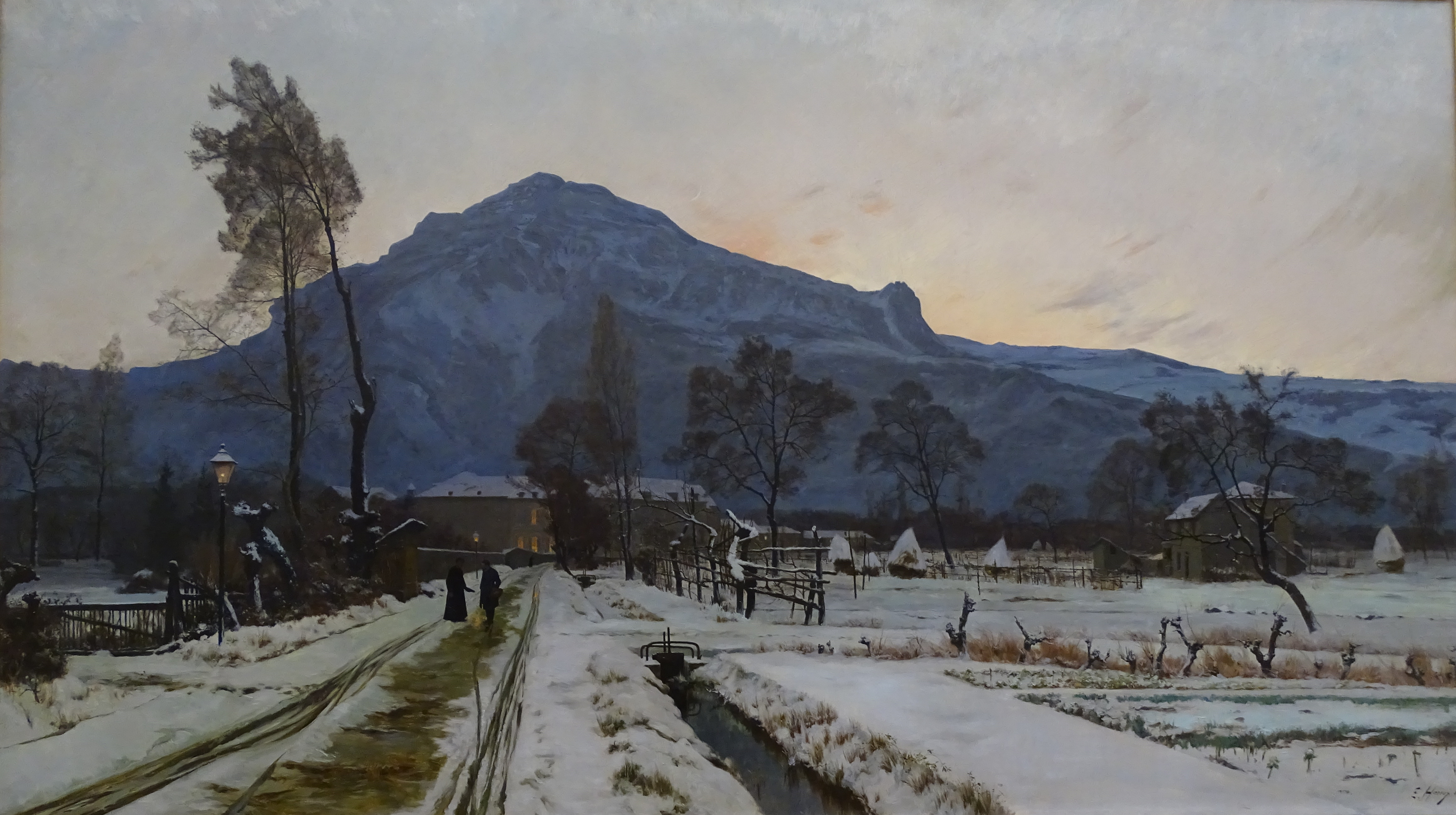
The Road to the Petit Séminaire, near Grenoble (now the Rue Anatole France)

Ernest Victor Hareux (18 February 1847, Paris - 16 February 1909, Grenoble) was a French painter of landscapes and genre scenes.

== Biography ==
He displayed a talent for drawing at the age of ten, and studied with several well known artists, including Charles Busson, Émile Bin and Léon Germain Pelouse. His first exhibition at the Salon was in 1868, and he gave regular showings there throughout his life; receiving a third-class medal in 1880. He was named a member of the Société des Artistes Français in 1883.

Occasionally, he painted in Normandy, and in La Creuse, where he joined the École de Crozant and met Laurent Guétal, a priest and painter, who invited him to Grenoble in 1887. The frequent bad weather there prevented him from painting, and he became discouraged, but returned again the following year.

He eventually came to favor painting in the mountains; befriending Théodore Ravanat, and other members of the artists' colony at Proveysieux. He was also associated with the École dauphinoise, which included Charles Bertier and Jean Achard, and was one of the founding members of the "Société des peintres de la montagne".

In 1906, he was named a Knight in the Légion of Honor. The following year, he was elected to chair #48 at the Académie Delphinale in Grenoble.
