= Jacques Gay =

French painter (1851–1925)

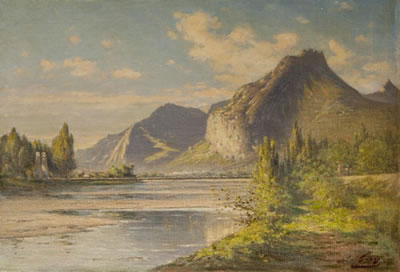
The Banks of the Drac, also known as "Nero's Helmet", after the rock formation (date unknown)

Jacques Gay (born in Voreppe, Isère on 22 February 1851, and died in Grenoble on 6 May 1925) was a French painter.

== Biography ==
Jacques Gay was a pupil of Firmin Gauthier and Jean-Léon Gérôme in Paris. He is a painter of genre works, a portraitist and a landscaping, and painted many rural scenes. Friend of Ernest Hebert, he was part of the painters group in Proveysieux, with Jean Achard and Théodore Ravanat. He also attended the École dauphinoise.

He worked regularly at the Salon from 1878 to 1902. He painted Dauphiné villages, inhabitants, and interiors with a realistic style and with a warm sensitivity.

His paintings can be seen at the Museum of Grenoble.
