= Eugénie Gruyer-Brielman =

French painter and designer

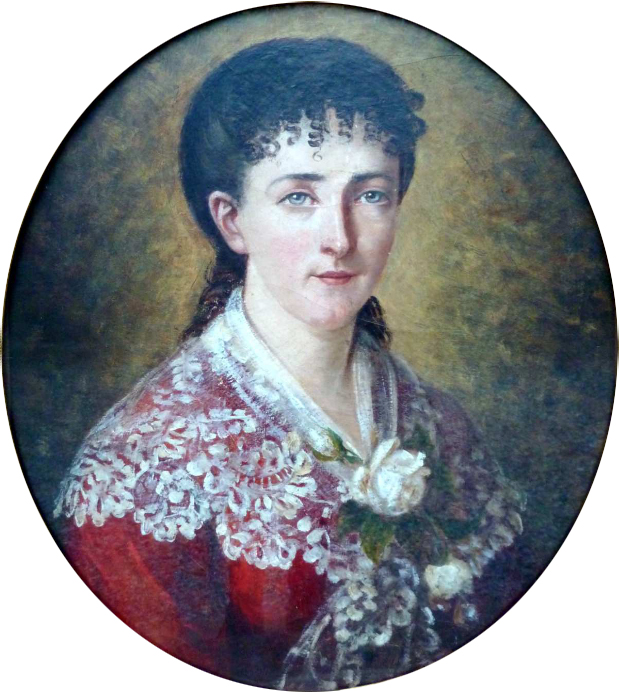
Eugénie Gruyer-Brielman; portrait by Henri Blanc-Fontaine (c.1880)

Eugénie Gruyer-Brielman, born Henriette Eugénie Clet (2 November 1837, Grenoble - 5 December 1921, Sassenage) was a French painter and designer.

== Biography ==
She was born to Jean Sébastian Clet (1807-1874), a construction contractor, and his wife Françoise, née Pellet. In 1858, she married the merchant, Jules Isodore Gröll (1833-1868). The year he died, she gave birth to their only child, Léon Jean Eugène.

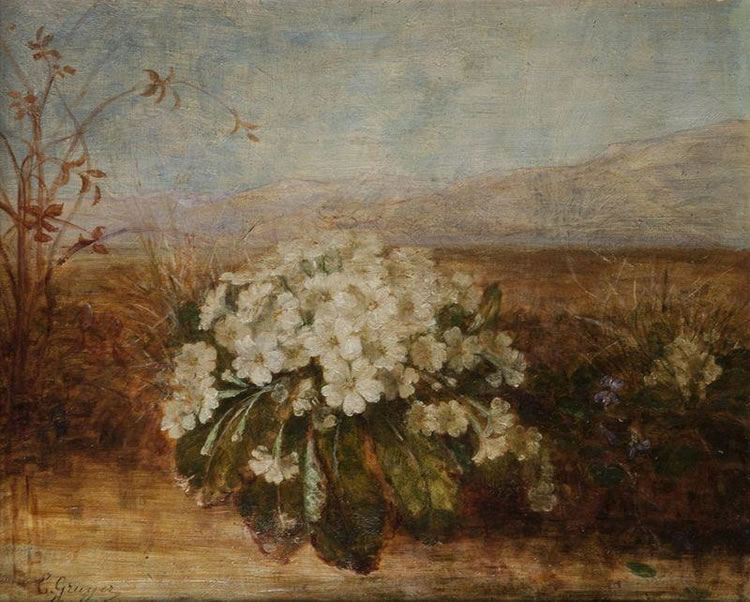
Wild Primroses

After learning the basics of painting from a local artist, she continued her studies at the Académie Julian in Paris, with Tony Robert-Fleury. Most of her works were genre scenes, in gouache, or landscapes and still-lifes in watercolors.

She remarried in 1875, to Jean-Hector Gruyer (1827-1908), a lyric tenor known as "Guardi", who later served as the mayor of Sassenage (1881-1898). This made her the sister-in-law of the painter, Henri Blanc-Fontaine, through his wife, Julie Amélie née Gruyer. He became her mentor, and they maintained a lifelong correspondence. She and Jean-Hector hosted meetings of the artistic community at their home, including several painters associated with the École dauphinoise, such as Jean Achard and François-Auguste Ravier. She also acquired a large library and was noted for her perceptive conversations.

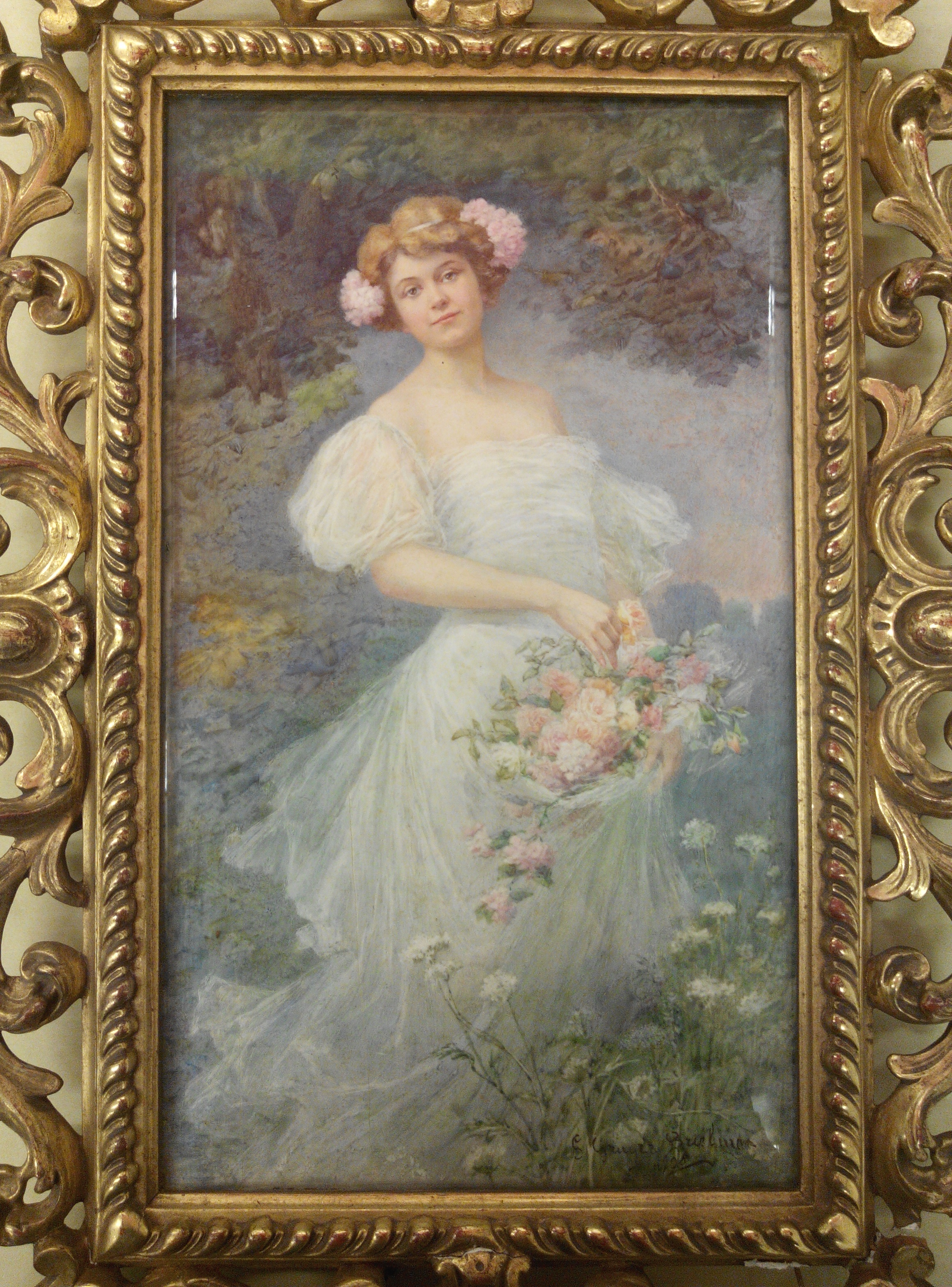
Young Lady with a Bouquet

The same year she married, she held her first exhibition under the name Eugénie Gruyer-Brielman, in recognition of the Brielmans; a family of artists who were related to her husband. The showing was successful, which encouraged her to present some of her works at the Paris Salon and the Exposition Universelle (1878), but her reception at the latter was lukewarm.

By 1885, her talent had been acknowledged and she was named an officer of the Ordre des Palmes académiques. During this time, she also served as a drawing teacher at a public school in the Goutte d'Or neighborhood of Paris.

From 1889 to 1900, she exhibited regularly and received an Honorable Mention at the Exposition Universelle in the latter year. In 1909, she received her last award; second prize at an exhibition of the Union of Women Painters and Sculptors.

== Sources ==
- François Roussier, Femmes peintres en Dauphiné (exhibition catalogue), Musée Mainssieux, Voiron, 2003
- Anatole Alès, Les femmes artistes au Salon de 1878 et à l'Exposition universelle, Imprimerie Duval, 1878 (Online)
- Elisabeth Hardouin-Fugier and Françoise Dupuis-Testenoire, Les peintres de natures mortes en France, Amateur Ed., 1998 ISBN 978-2-85917-253-4
- Maurice Wantellet, Deux siècles et plus de peinture dauphinoise, Eds. Wantellet, 1987 ISBN 978-2-950222-30-5
