= Jean Achard (painter) =

French painter (1807–1884)

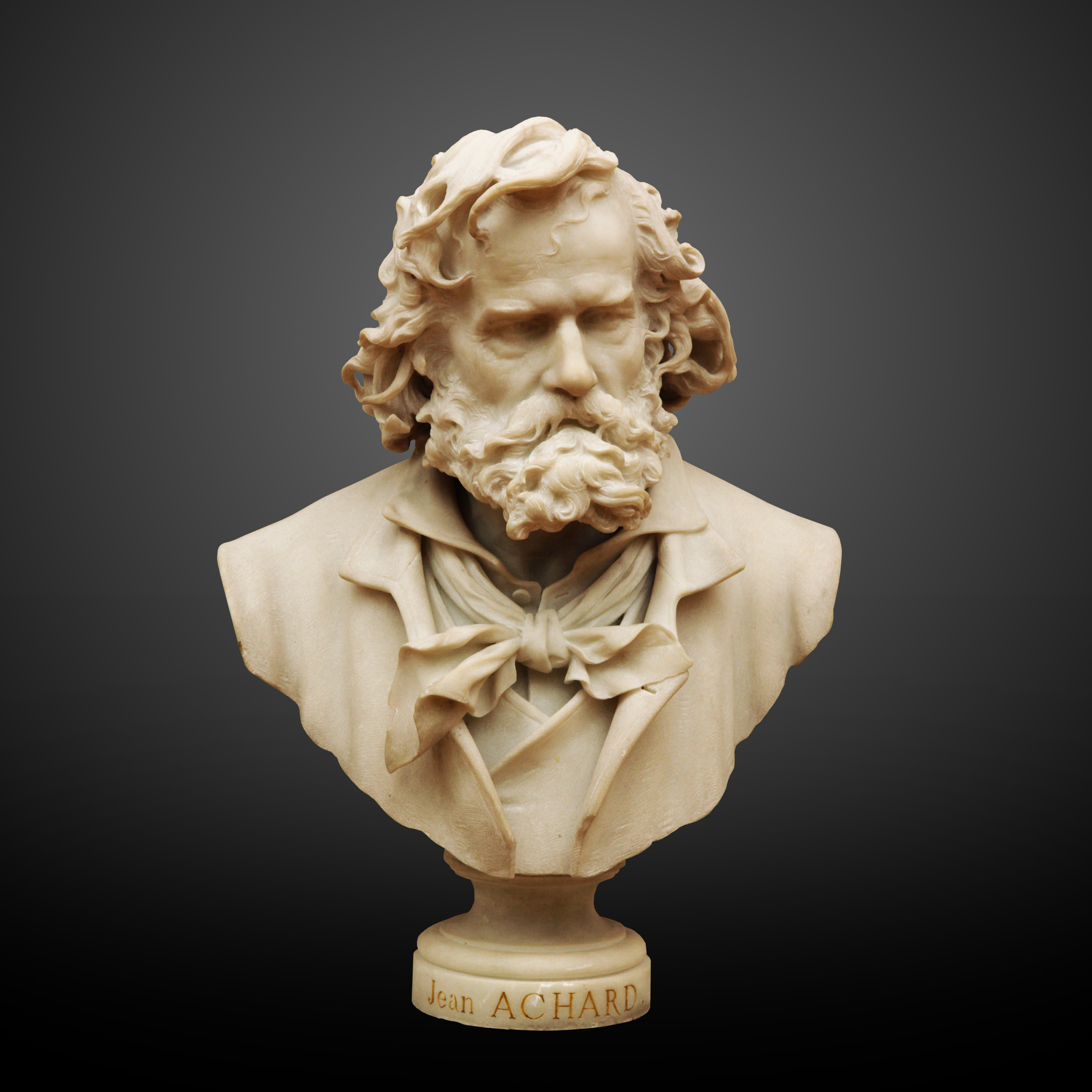
Jean Achard, by Henri Ding

Jean Alexis Achard (French pronunciation: [ʒɑ̃ a.lek.si a.ʃaːʁ]) (17 April 1807 – 2 October 1884) was a French painter.

== Biography ==
Born in Voreppe, Isère, into a farming family, Jean Alexis Achard was self-taught and started his career as a clerk for a lawyer. He began his apprenticeship by copying paintings at the Museum of Grenoble. He then attended the free municipal school of Grenoble, and met the Lyon school painters who gave him his first tutelage. Isidore Dagnan was his teacher from 1824 to 1830. At 27, he moved to Paris and copied the Dutch masters at the Louvre.

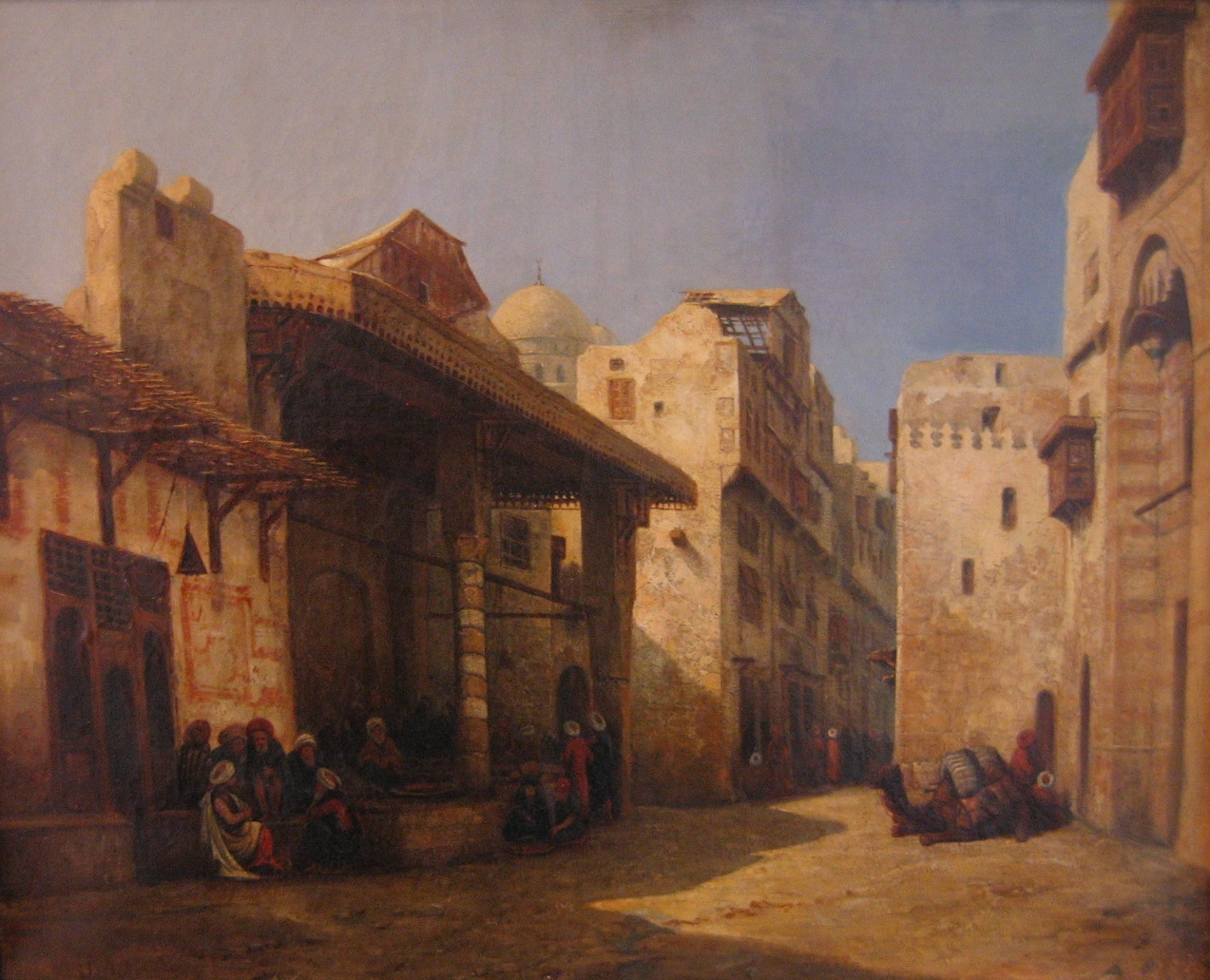
Rue du Caire, by Jean Achard

He made an expedition organized by the St. Simonians and thus lived in Egypt between 1835 and 1837 with his friend Victor Sappey. He bought landscapes and genre scenes when he came back to France. Thus, he exhibited at the Salon (Paris) in 1838, Vue prise aux environs du Caire, and then regularly thereafter, as in 1843 with Vue de la vallée de Grenoble.

In 1846, he attended the Barbizon School and became friends with the painters Jean-Baptiste-Camille Corot, Théodore Rousseau, Charles-François Daubigny and Narcisse Virgilio Díaz, on whom he had a certain influence and who taught him to paint in the pattern of the Paris region. He also stayed in Auvers-sur-Oise for a while.

Between 1858 and 1859, he lived in Honfleur and lived in the Saint-Siméon farm, with Eugène Boudin and Claude Monet. He became sick and suffered thru serious financial difficulties, he retired in 1870 in Grenoble, where he died in 1884. He is buried at Saint Roch Cemetery.

== Works ==
=== Paintings ===
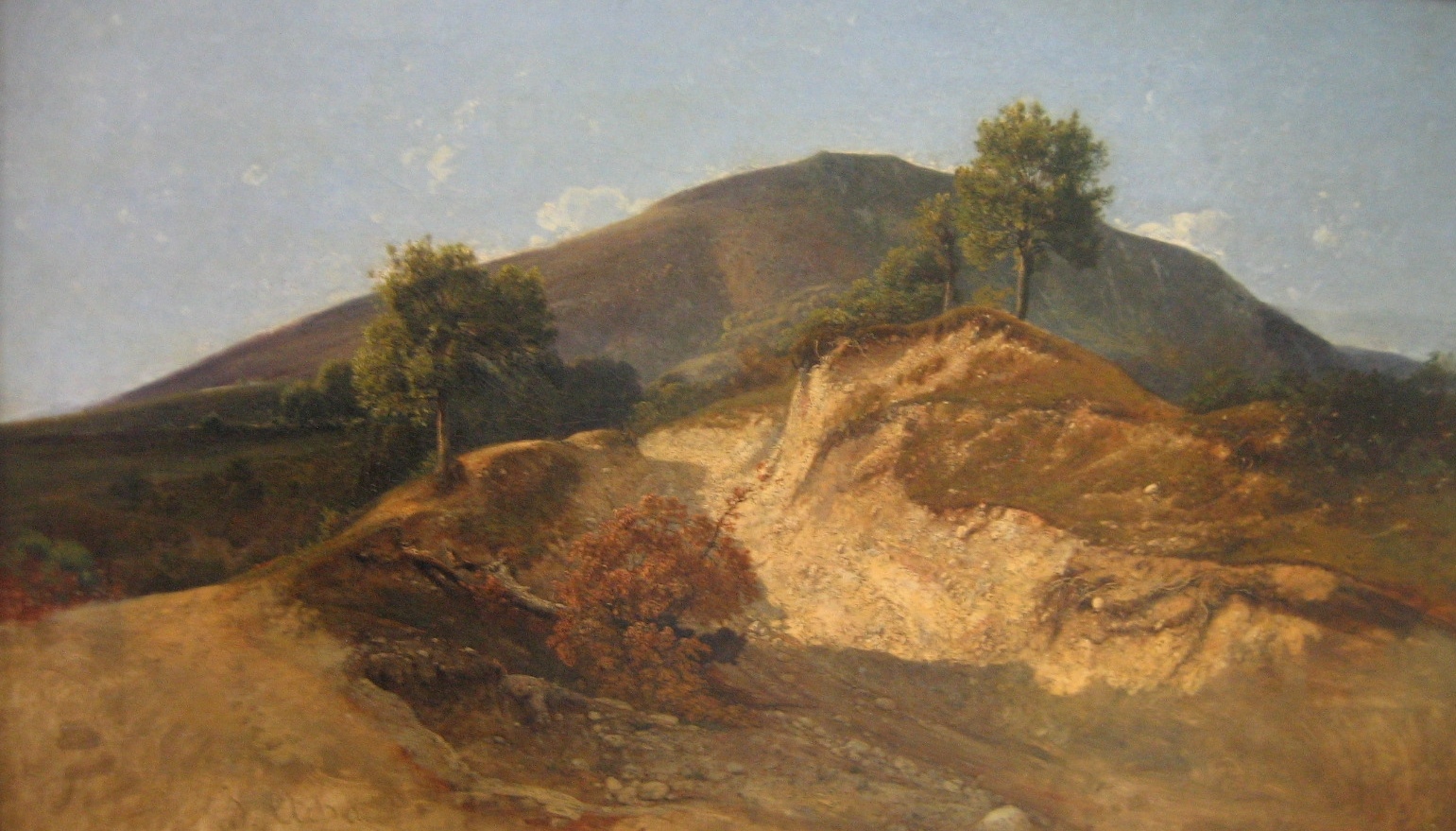
Paysage dauphinois, by Jean Achard

Achard is known for his paintings of Dauphiné landscapes, which earned him the title of "master of the landscape in Dauphiné". He is the creator of the École dauphinoise, whose notable members were Laurent Guétal, Ernest Victor Hareux, Charles Bertier and a few others.

Several works by Achard are kept at the Museum of Grenoble, including Paysage, vue de Saint-Egrève (près de Grenoble) and La chaumière. His other works can be seen in Paris at the Louvre, the Musée des Beaux-Arts de Chambéry, the Musée du Château de Fontainebleau.

=== Prints ===
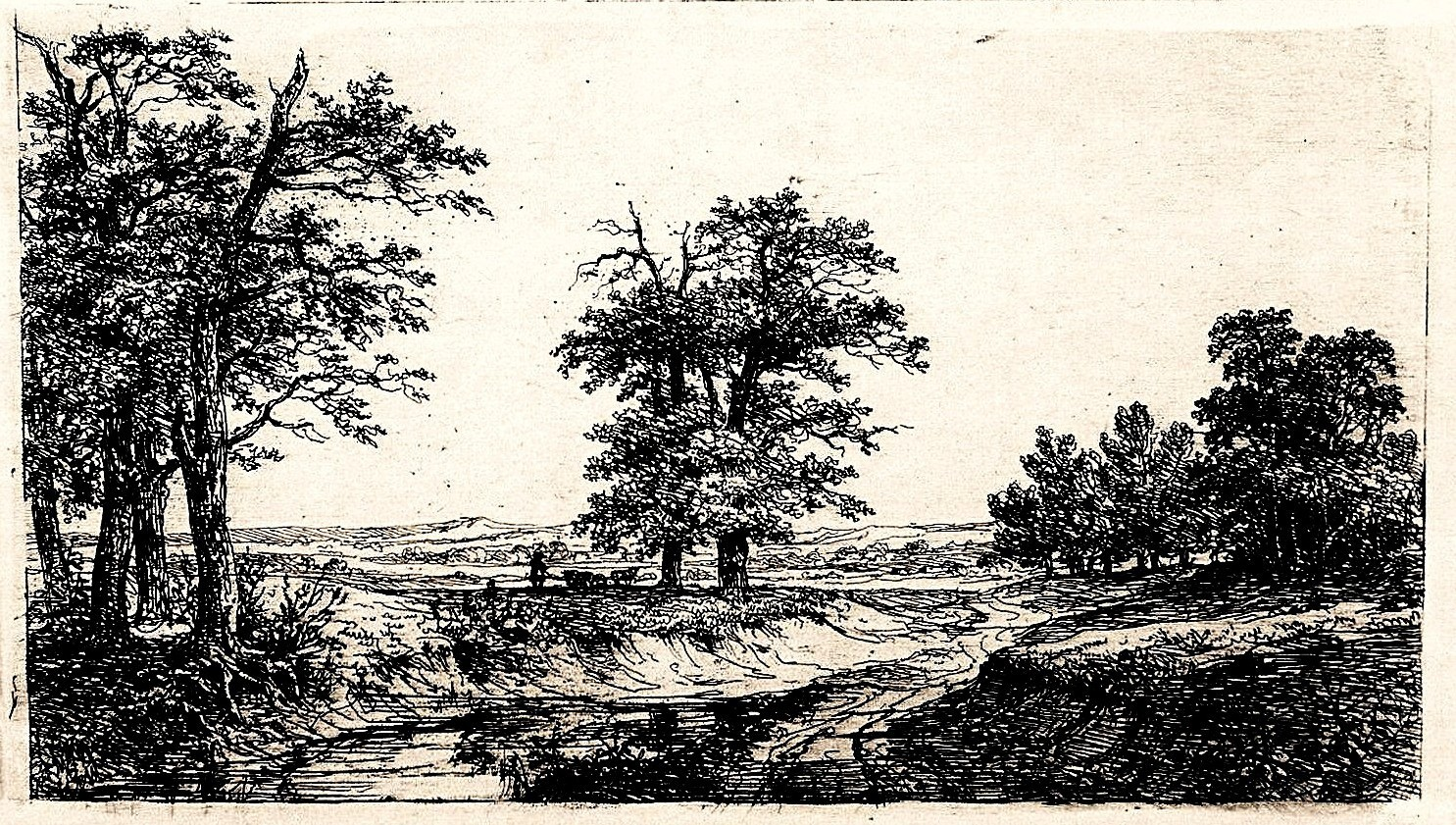
Paysage, by Jean Achard

Achard was also a renowned printmaker, with over sixty etchings. His first prints were created after his paintings (for a large dissemination of his works), and cover major horizons. Thereafter, he focused on more local views of woodlands.

== Pupils ==
Henri Harpignies was his pupil when he was in Paris. But after his comeback in Grenoble, his influence was considerable, especially on Laurent Guétal, Charles Bertier and Édouard Brun, who eagerly followed his advice. He was a teacher and an adviser for the generation of young Dauphiné painters in Proveysieux, including Théodore Ravanat, Jacques Gay, Henri Blanc-Fontaine.

== Legacy ==
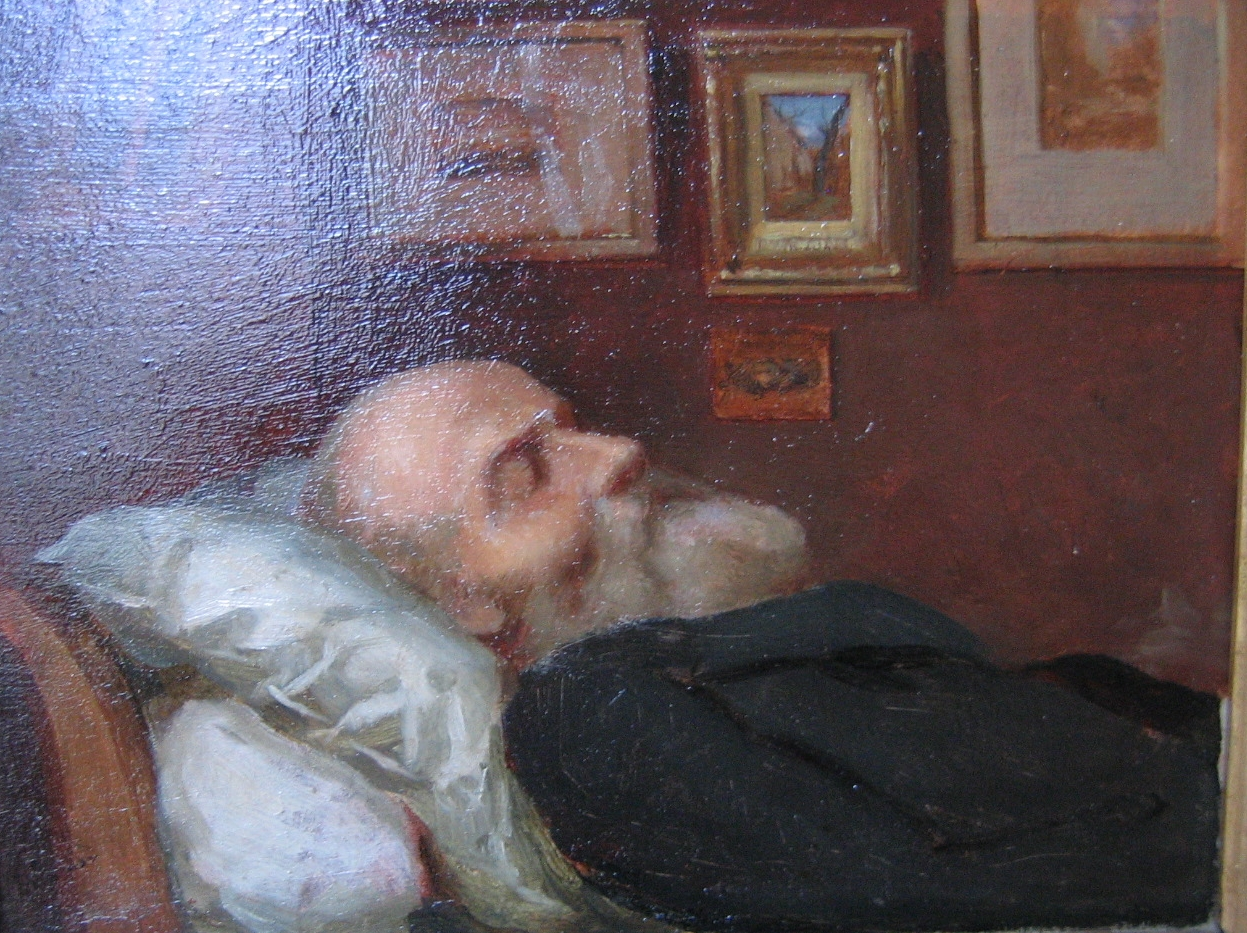
Jean Achard sur son lit de mort, by Jules Bernard

Achard was widely represented in his friends and students' works, including :

- Victor Sappey (several ink or pencil drawings, Library of Grenoble)
- Eugene Faure (Museum of Grenoble)
- Henri Ding (sculpture, Museum of Grenoble)
- Henri Blanc-Fontaine
- Jacques Gay (pencil drawing, Musée dauphinois)
- Stéphane Baron (Paris, Musée de l'Assistance Publique-Hopitaux de Paris)
- Eugène Boudin (1867 watercolor, representing Achard, Johan Barthold Jongkind, Emile van Marcke and Claude Monet)
- Jules Bernard (Achard on his deathbed)

== Exhibitions ==
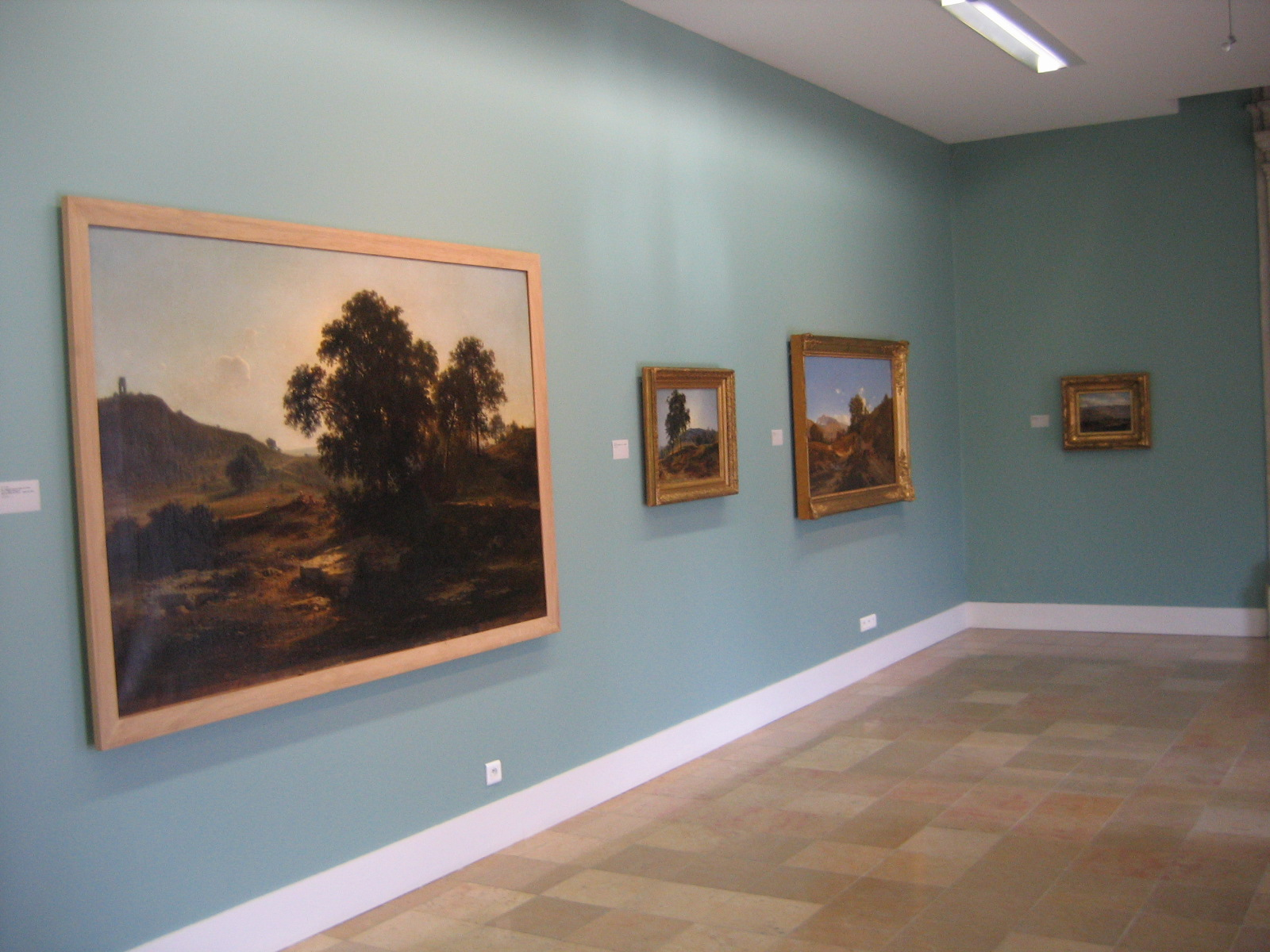
Achard exhibition, Musée Hébert

- Jean Achard peintures, Museum of Grenoble, 1984-1985
- Trois maîtres du paysage dauphinois au XIXe siècle, Jean Achard, Laurent Guétal, Charles Bertier, Museum of Grenoble, 2005-2006
- Jean Achard, un paysagiste à l'école de la nature, Musée Hébert de La Tronche, 2008-2009

== Bibliography ==
- Jean Achard, Jacques Lamoure et Jacques Antoine Biboud, ACMAD edition
- Jean Achard, Laurent Guétal, Charles Bertier : Trois maîtres du paysage dauphinois au XIXe siècle, Musée de Grenoble, Artlys editions (ISBN 2-85495-270-7)
- Dictionnaire des petits Maitres de la Peinture (1820-1920), Pierre Cabanne and Gerald Schurr, Amateur editions, 2003 (ISBN 2-85917-378-1)
- Jean Achard, un paysagiste à l'école de la nature, Laurence Huault-Nesme, Glénat, 2008 (ISBN 978-2-7234-6671-4)
- Grenoble, visions d'une ville, Peintures, Dessins, Estampes, Musée de l'Ancien Évêché, Glénat editions, (ISBN 978-2-72346-092-7)
- Le Dauphiné et les peintres, une source d'inspiration, Maurice Wantellet, Le dauphiné libéré editions
- Le sentiment de la Montagne, Glénat / Musée de Grenoble, 1998, (ISBN 2 7234 2614 9)
