= Henri Blanc-Fontaine =

French painter

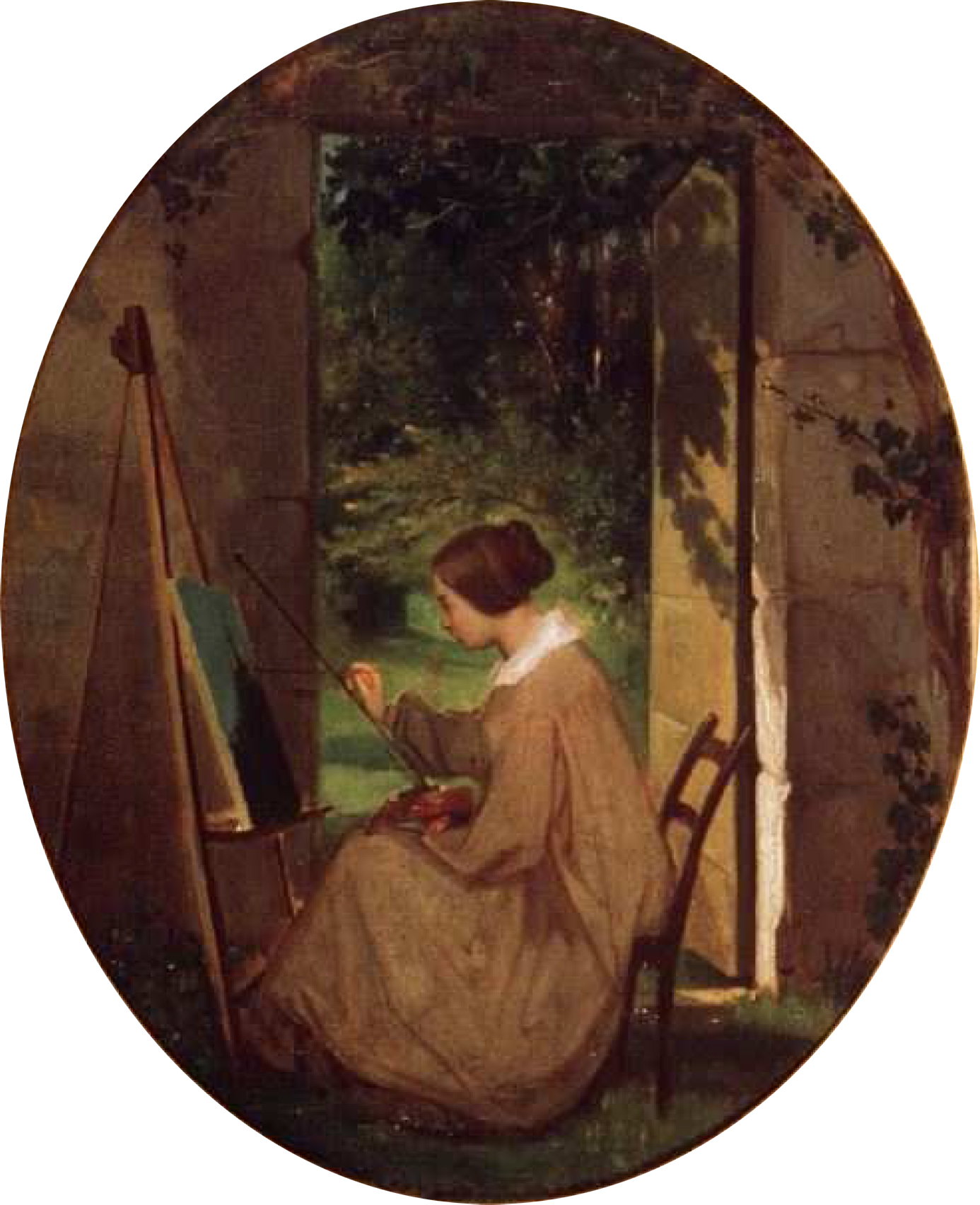
The painter, Adèle Gamel, at her easel (1840)

Henri Emmanuel Blanc-Fontaine (16 January 1819, Grenoble – 20 December 1897, Sassenage) was a French painter. He created genre scenes, portraits, landscapes, and still lifes.

== Biography ==
He had originally planned to have a legal career, but followed the advice of his friend, Diodore Rahoult, a rising local artist, and went to Paris, where he was a pupil of Léon Cogniet. In 1843, he also enrolled at the École de Beaux-Arts. He had his first exhibit at the Salon of 1848. Rahoult introduced him to landscape painting in 1853, and that became his favorite subject after 1870.

He was also a pupil of Jean Achard (whose portrait he painted; now kept in the Museum of Grenoble) and François-Auguste Ravier in Charlieu. The painter, Eugénie Gruyer-Brielman, was his sister-in-law, by her relationship to his wife, Julie Amélie, née Gruyer.

In 1868, he and Rahoult were commissioned to decorate the new Musée-bibliothèque de Grenoble. He was member of the artists' colony in Proveysieux and was associated a while with École dauphinoise. His paintings can be seen at the Museum of Grenoble, the Musée dauphinois and the Musée des Beaux-Arts de Chambéry. His painting Souvenir de La Grave won an honorable mention at the 1855 Exposition Universelle in Paris, and was noticed by Maxime Du Camp.

== Sources ==
- Nathalie Servonnat-Favier, catalogue of the exhibition Peintre(s) à Proveysieux, Musée de l'Ancien Évêché, Grenoble, 2003 (ISBN 2-905375-56-6)
- Dictionnaire des petits Maîtres de la Peinture (1820-1920), Pierre Cabanne and Gerald Schurr, Amateur editions, 2003, (ISBN 2-85917-378-1)
