= Henri Ding =

French sculptor (1844–1898)

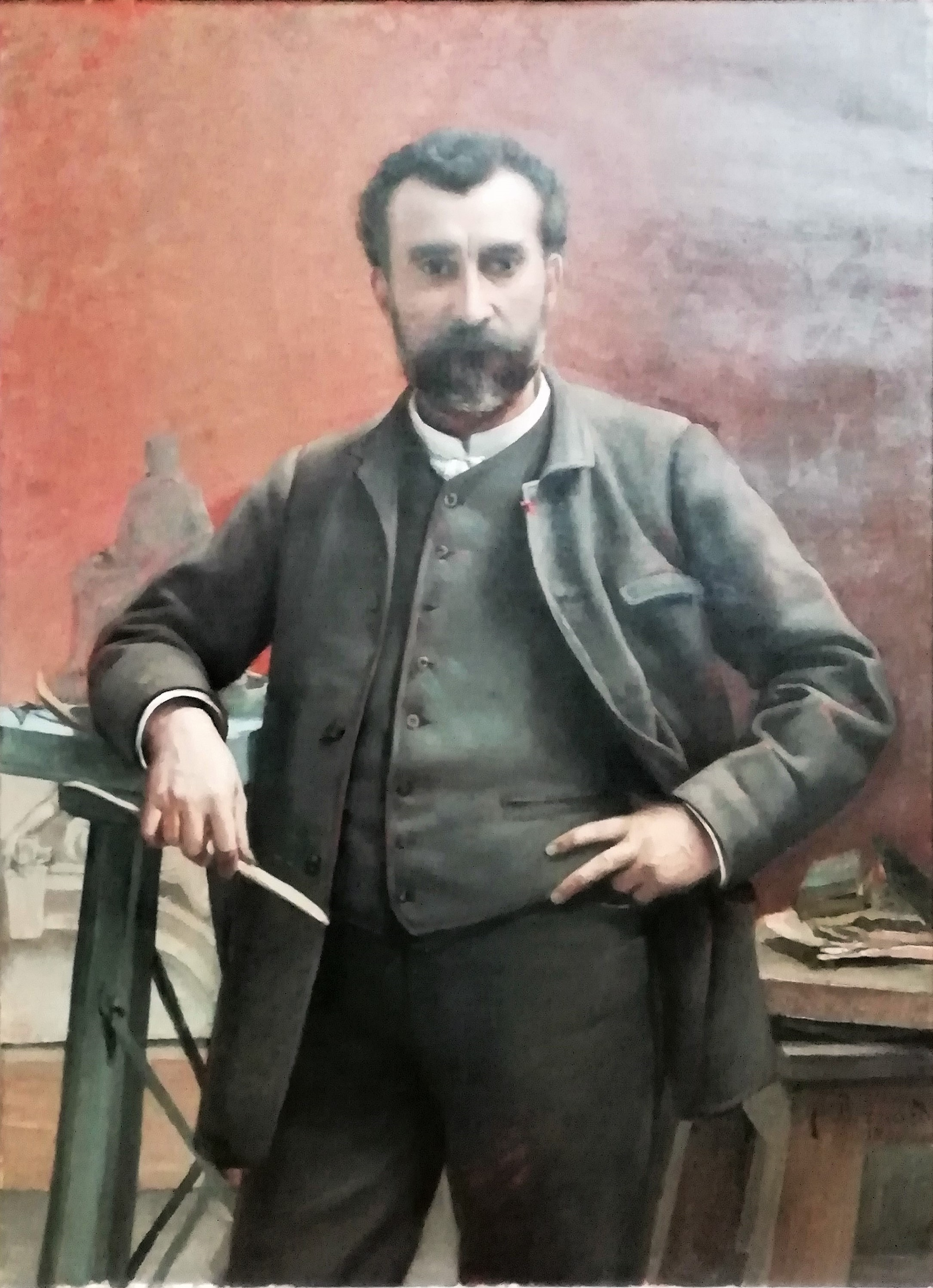
Portrait by Jules Bernard, 1890

Henri Marius Ding (30 June 1844 – 1898) was a French sculptor.

Henri Ding was born in Grenoble. His most famous work is the Fontaine des trois ordres (Fountain of the three orders) on the place Notre-Dame in Grenoble. It paid tribute to Dauphiné people who brought the beginnings of the French Revolution, and was conducted to celebrate the events centennial in 1888. Ding died in Grenoble.

Henry Ding received the Légion d'honneur. Most of his works can be seen in the Museum of Grenoble.

== Works ==
His main works include :

- The Statue of Liberty, also named Marianne, à Vizille
- The Monument to Xavier Jouvin, in Grenoble
- Several sculptures in the church of Le Périer
- More than ten funerary monuments in the Saint Roch Cemetery, in Grenoble

== Gallery ==
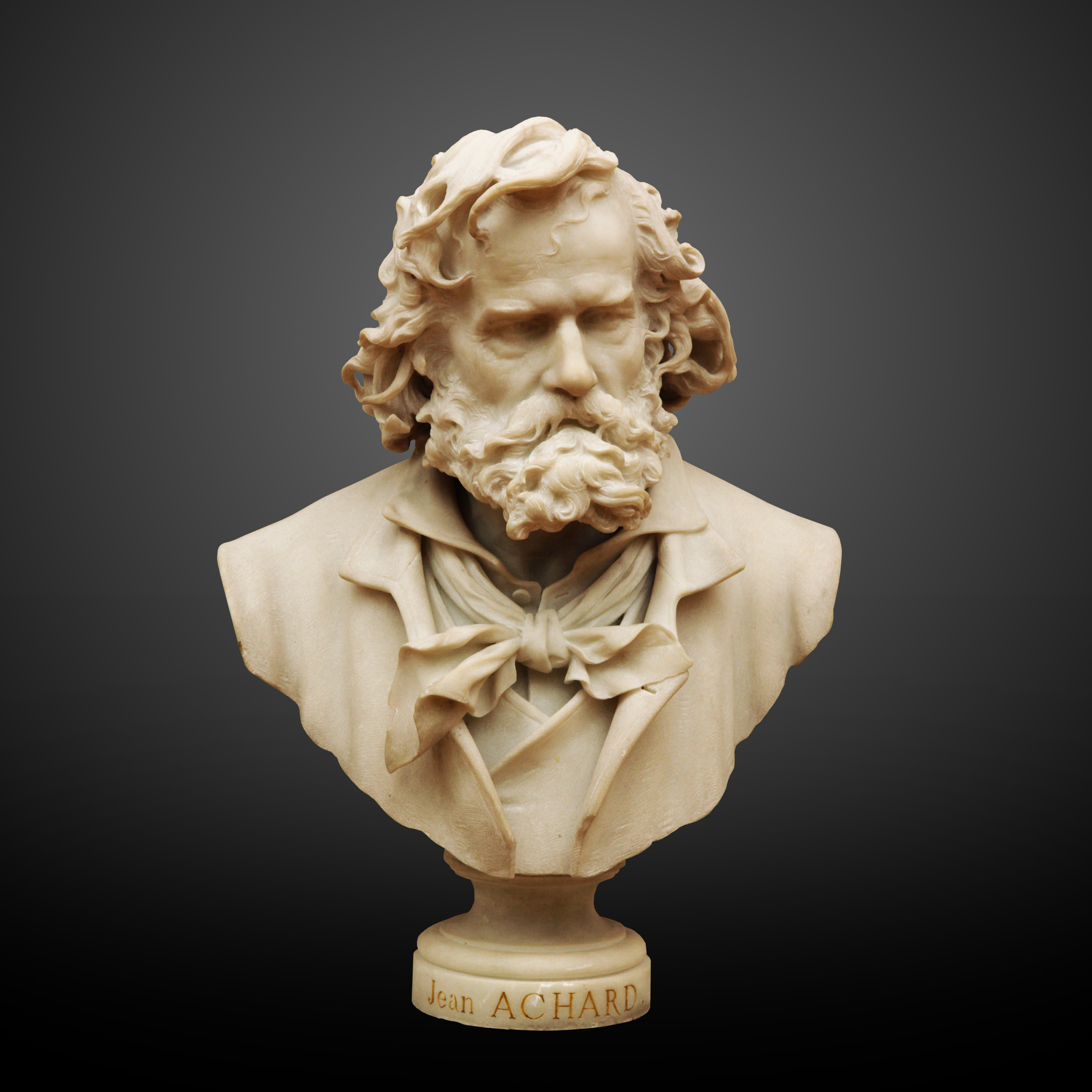
Bust of Jean Achard

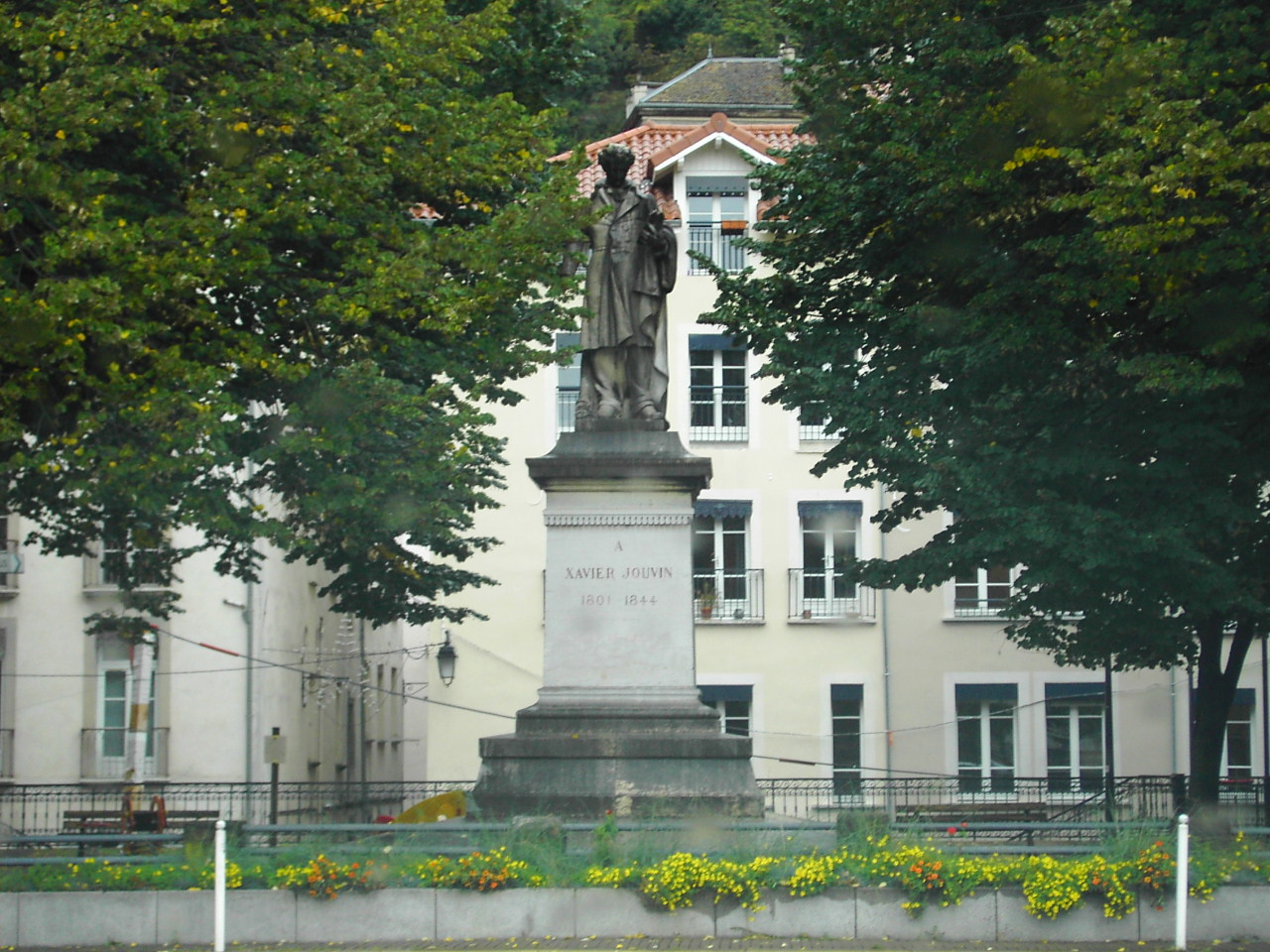
Monument to Xavier Jouvin

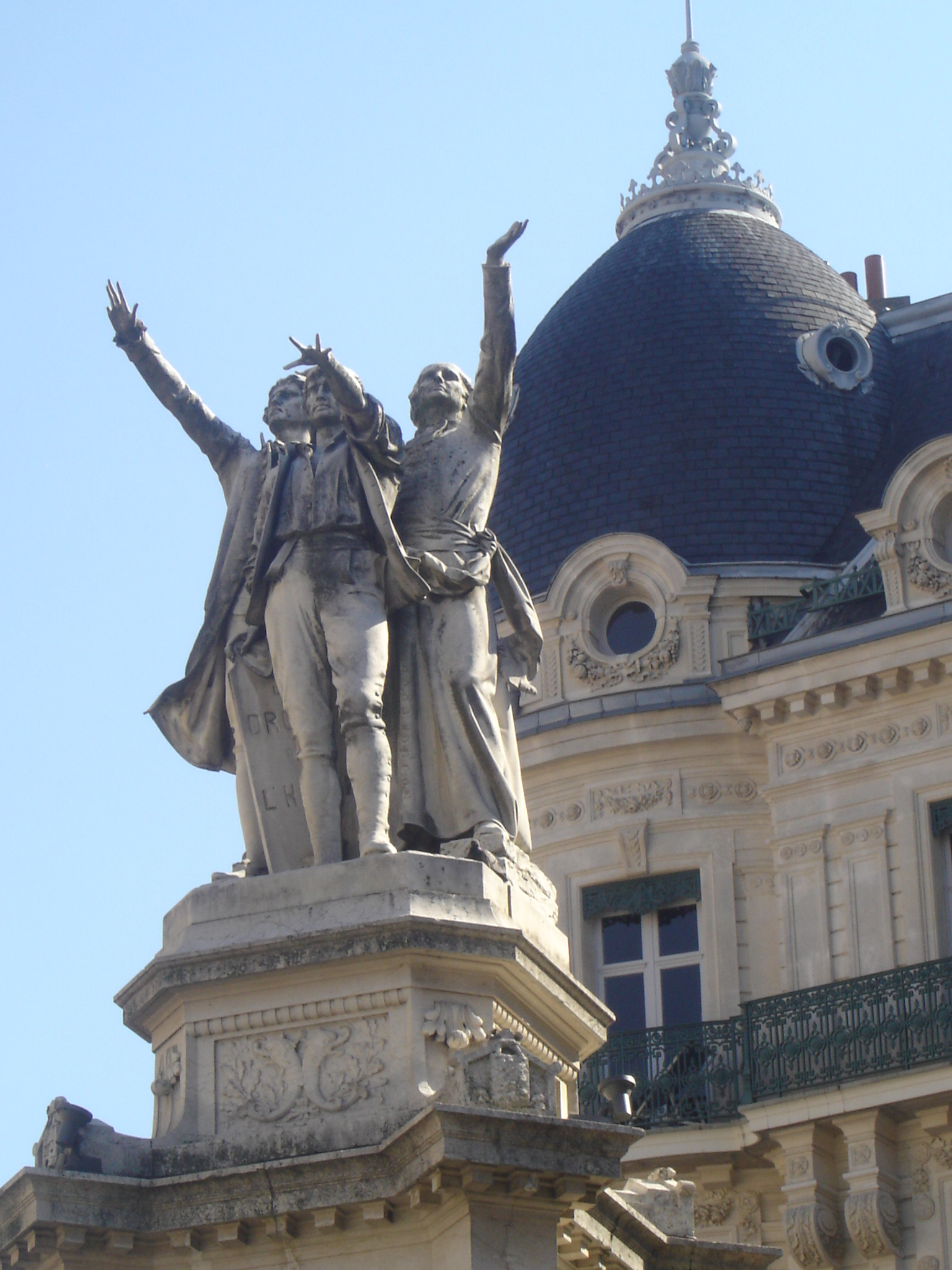
Fountain of the three orders, in Grenoble
