= Diodore Rahoult =

French painter

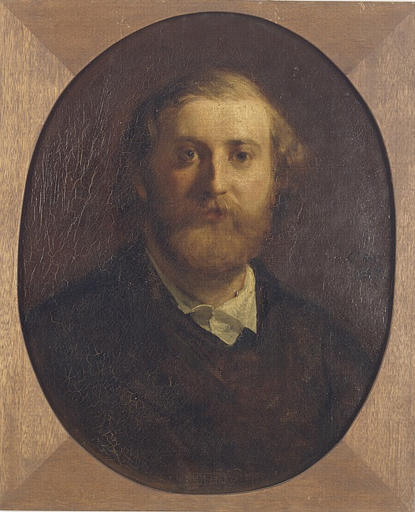
Diodore Rahoult; portrait by Louis Gustave Ricard

Charles Diodore Rahoult (2 December 1819, Grenoble – 23 March 1874, Grenoble) was a French painter of landscapes and genre scenes.

== Life and work ==
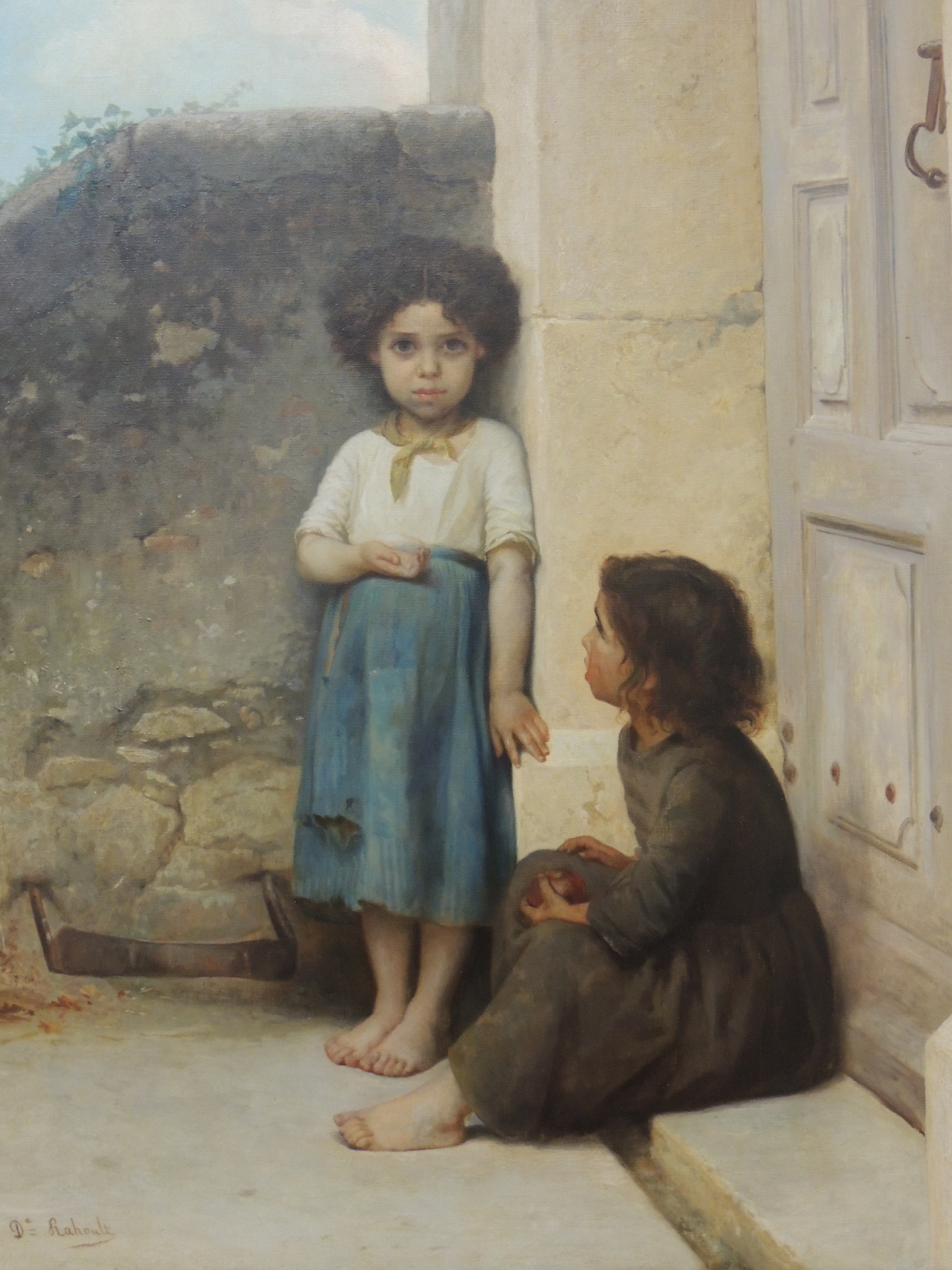
The Closed Door

He was born into a family of merchants, and his father was a confectioner. He showed an early aptitude for art and studied with Horace Mollard (1800-1872), a local landscape painter. When he had mastered the basics, he went to Paris to become a student of Léon Cogniet; accompanied by his friend, Henri Blanc-Fontaine, who he had convinced to abandon a legal career, in favor of painting. After visiting Rome and Naples, he returned to Grenoble in 1847.

The following year, he exhibited at the Salon there, as well as the one in Lyon. In 1852, he was commissioned to create decorative works in the Chapel of the Virgin at the Collegiate Church of Saint-André. He also decorated a café on the Place Grenette, He returned to Paris in 1868, to exhibit his "La Rentrée de la Cour au Palais de Justice" (The Return of the Court to the Palace of Justice) at the Salon there.

Shortly after, he and his friend, Blanc-Fontaine, were commissioned to create allegorical paintings at the new Musée-bibliothèque de Grenoble: those on Poetry, History and Geometry in the vestibule, and those on Theology, Astronomy, Mechanics, Legislation and Philosophy in the main library. At that time, he became associated with a group of artists who met at Proveysieux. He occasionally worked as a lithographer and illustrated the dialect poems of François Blanc.

He died of a stroke at the age of fifty-three, and was interred at Saint Roch Cemetery.

His works may be seen at the Musée de Grenoble and the Musée de la Révolution française. In 2013, the Musée de l'Ancien Évêché, and the Bibliothèque municipale de Grenoble, organized a joint retrospective of his works.

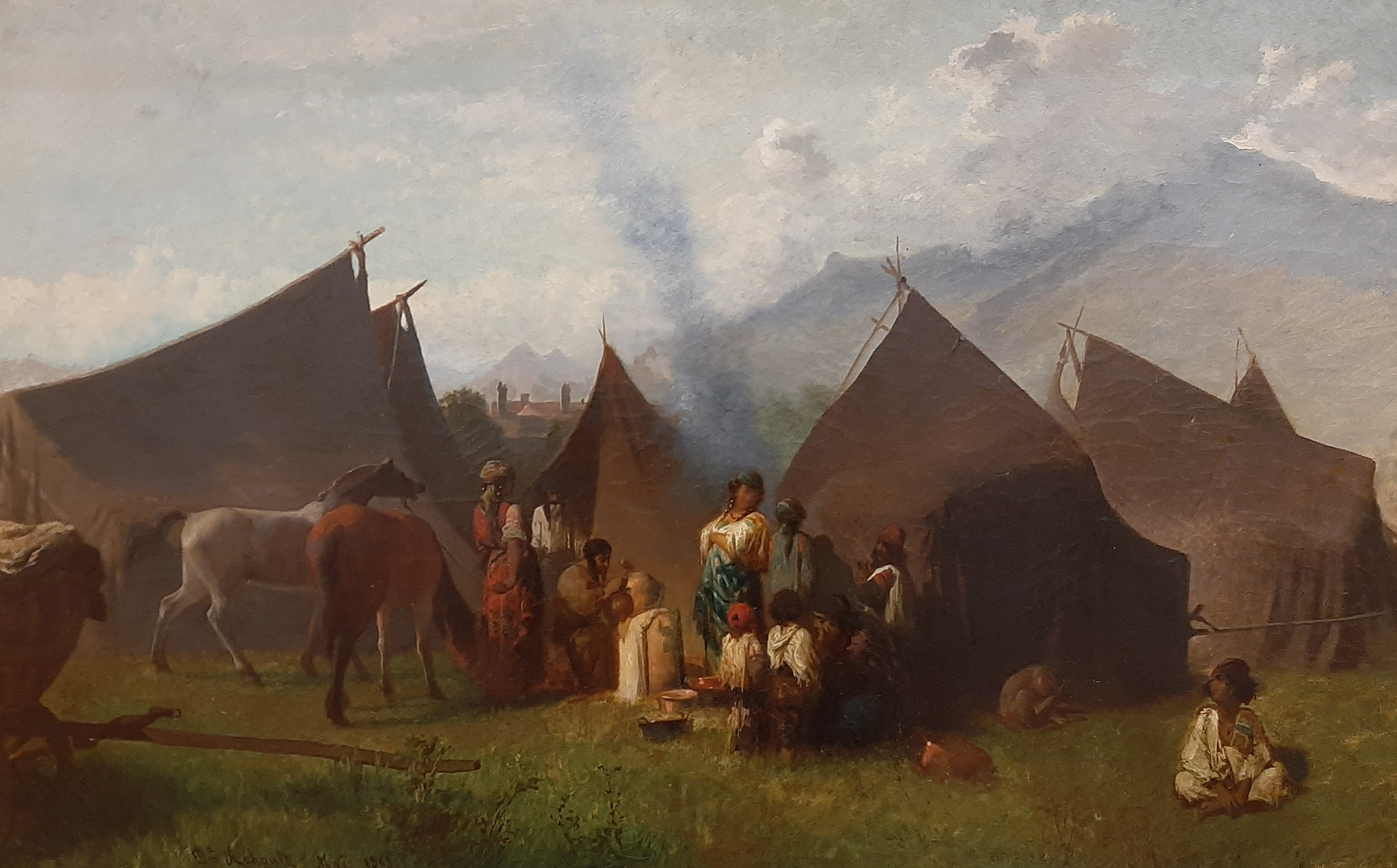
Gypsy Camp at the Porte de France
