= Charles Bertier =

French painter

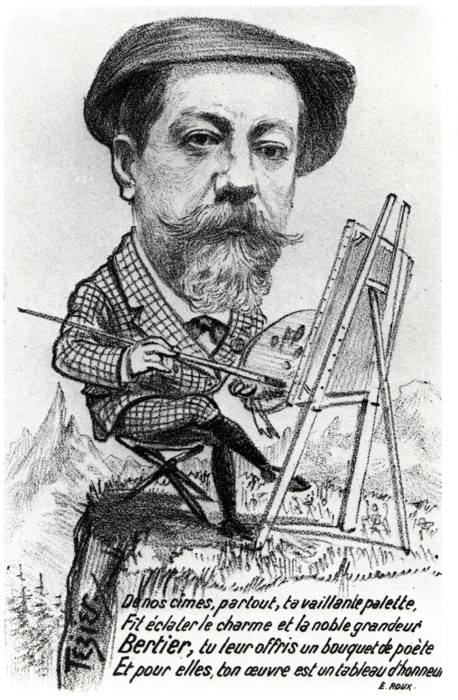
- Charles Bertier; caricature by Eugène Tézier
- Born: 1 October 1860; Grenoble, France
- Died: 26 July 1926 (aged 65); Grenoble, France
- Known for: Painting

Charles Alexandre Bertier (1 October 1860 – 26 July 1924) was a French landscape painter.

== Biography ==
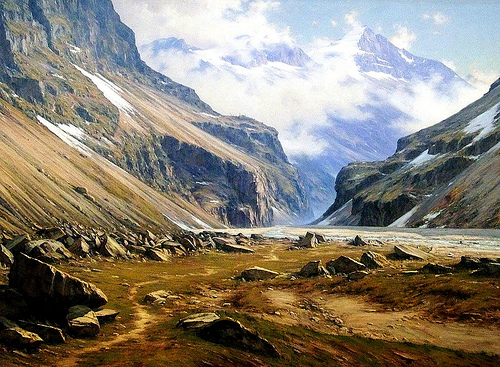
The Valley of Vénéon, Oisans (1894)

His family owned a glove making business. He entered the "Petit Séminaire du Rondeau", where he studied design with Laurent Guétal, who introduced him to painting mountains and other impressive scenery in a style that would mark what later became known as the "École Dauphinoise", a group that also included Ernest Victor Hareux and Jean Achard.

In 1875, he enrolled at a vocational school (now known as the École Vaucanson) to learn his family's trade, as well as drawing. This was followed by military service, during which he showed off his works for the first time. Later, he was admitted to the École des Beaux-Arts in Paris, where he held several exhibitions at the Salon. In 1900, he was one of the artists who provided decorations for Le Train Bleu, a famous restaurant near the Gare de Lyon in Paris.

He was the holder of 31 awards, French and foreign, a member of the "Société des Artistes Français", a founding member of the "Société des Peintres de Montagne" and a judge on several art competition juries. He briefly departed from landscapes to produce some portraits for a benefactor in Russia who promised to place some of his works in the Hermitage.

In 1913, his studio was destroyed by a fire and he was unable to save any of the paintings, drawings and manuscripts stored there. He recovered his spirits by travelling to paint in the French and Swiss Alps, including a visit to Mont Blanc, and resumed his schedule of exhibitions.
