= Musée de l'Ancien Évêché =

Coordinates: 45.1929°N 5.7321°E

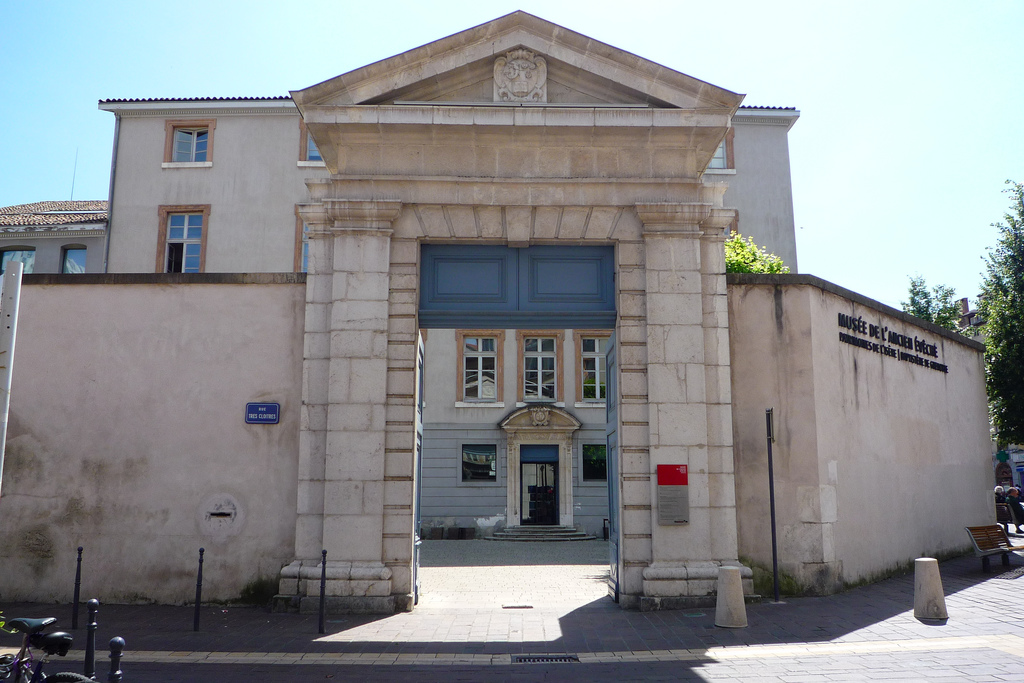
The Ancien Evêché Museum entrance

The Musée de l'Ancien Évêché (Museum of the Former Bishopric) is a departmental museum located in Grenoble, France and dedicated to the Isère heritage through the history of its Bishop's palace. Inaugurated in 1998, it is settled in the former Bishop's palace, near Grenoble Cathedral. The museum gives access to the remains of an early Christian baptistry and to a section of the vestiges of the Gallo-Roman wall in the basement of the building.

== Permanent exhibition ==
The permanent exhibition Isère through History displays items and paintings relating to the development of Isère from pre-history to the present day. The museum also shows regularly temporary exhibitions of local artists. In December 2014, a public garden was inaugurated near the entrance.

== Temporary exhibitions ==
- Diodore Rahoult from November 2013 to May 2014
- The Alps of Doisneau from November 2012 to September 2013
- He Yifu. The journey of a Chinese painter in the Alps from November 2010 to February 2011
- Jules Flandrin. works from 1889 to 1914, from November 2008 to April 2009
- Grenoble. Visions of a city, from November 2007 to April 2008
- Alexandre Debelle, from February 2006 to May 2006
- The Isère heritage in comics, from November 2004 to May 2005
- Painter (s) in Proveysieux, from October 2003 to May 2004
- Carthusian monasteries in Europe, from October 2002 to May 2003
- Abbé Calès, a man, an artist, from September 2001 to April 2002
- The Tour du Pin triptych, from April 2000 to July 2001

== Access ==
The B tramline: Notre-Dame-Musée station.

== See also ==
- Cularo
