= Laurent Guétal =

French painter

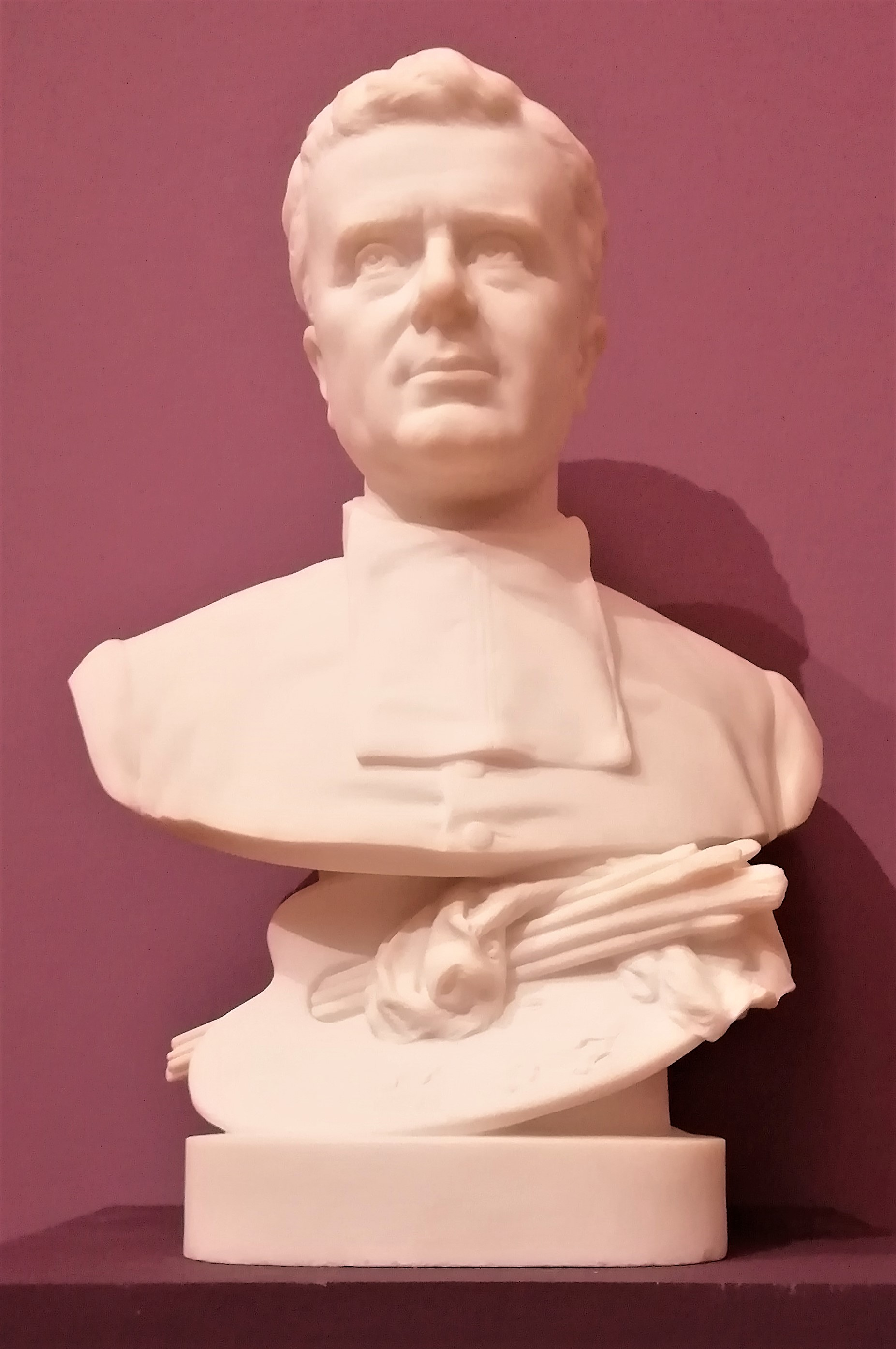
Laurent Guétal; bust by Aimé Charles Irvoy

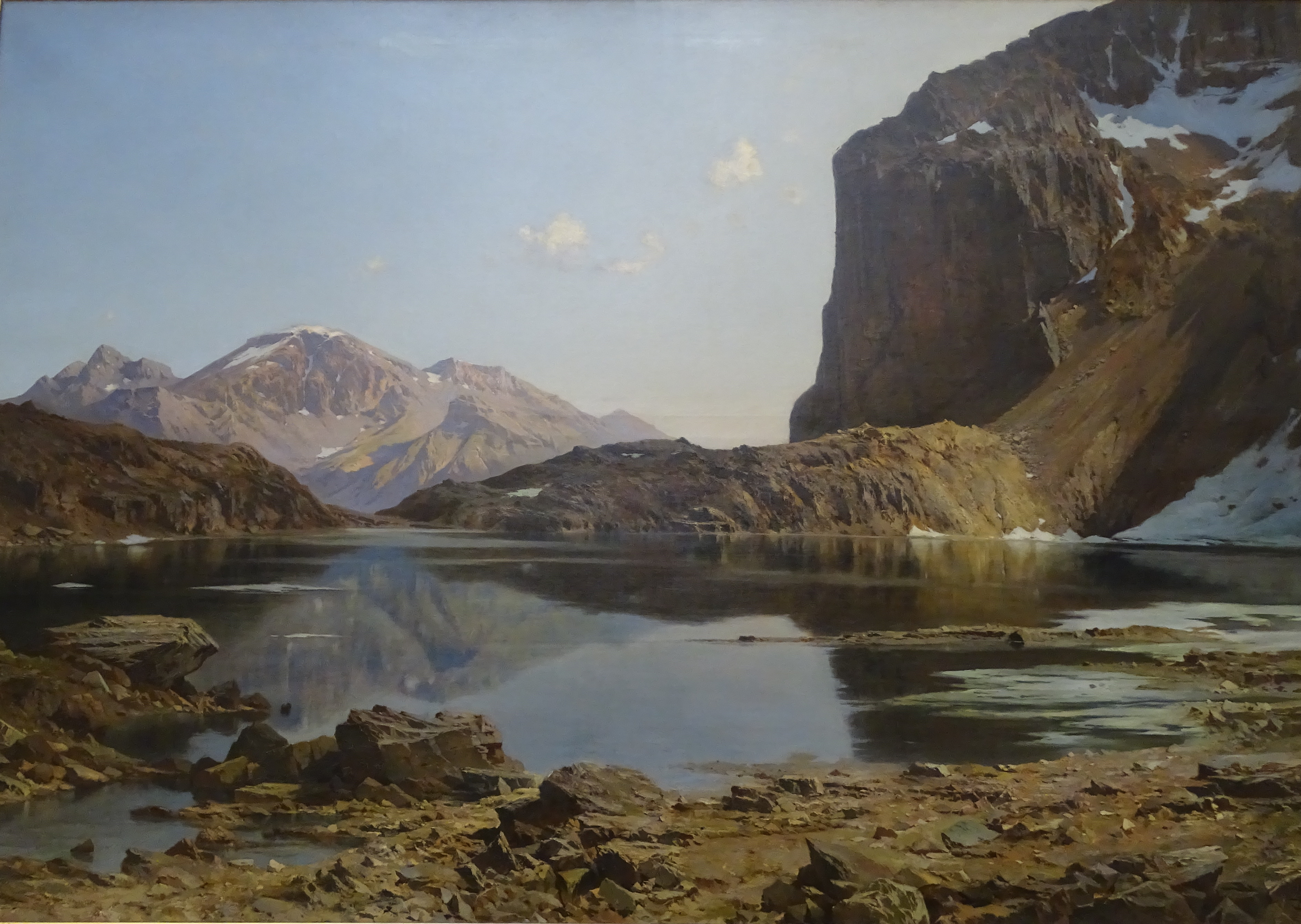
The Lac de l'Eychauda

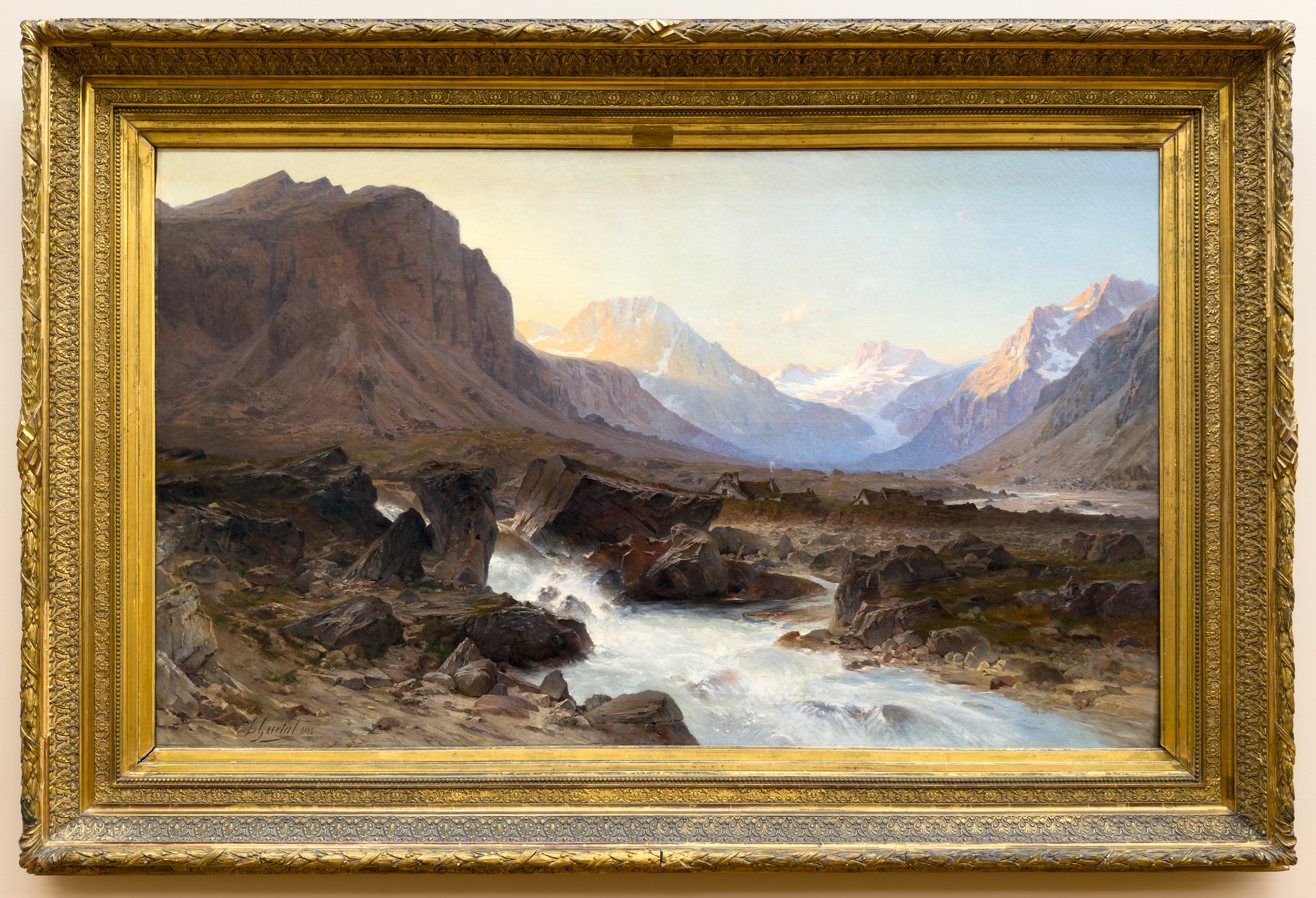
La Bérarde en Oisans et la vallée de la Pilatte (1882), Musée de Grenoble

Laurent Guétal, also known as the Abbé Guétal (12 December 1841 – 18 February 1892) was a French landscape painter and Catholic priest.

== Life and work ==
He was born in Vienne. He was ordained a priest in 1862, and spent much of his life at the Petit Séminaire of Rondeau, near Grenoble. Most of his works were painted in that vicinity.

His primary stylistic influence came from Jean Achard, but he eventually adopted a more purely realistic approach. He was associated with the École de Crozant, and was one of the first members of the École dauphinoise, a school of landscape painters in the Dauphiné, which included Ernest Victor Hareux and Charles Bertier.

He was a regular exhibitor at the Salon in Paris, from 1882 to 1889. One of his best-known works, depicting the Lac de l'Eychauda, received an award there in 1886, and was chosen to be displayed at the Exposition Universelle (1889). It is currently held at the Musée de Grenoble. His native town has another well known work, "The End of the World at Allevard", in the Musée des beaux-arts et d'archéologie de Vienne.

He died in 1892 in Grenoble and is interred at the Saint Roch Cemetery. The largest number of his works may be seen at the Musée de Grenoble.
