= Henri Harpignies =

French painter (1819–1916)

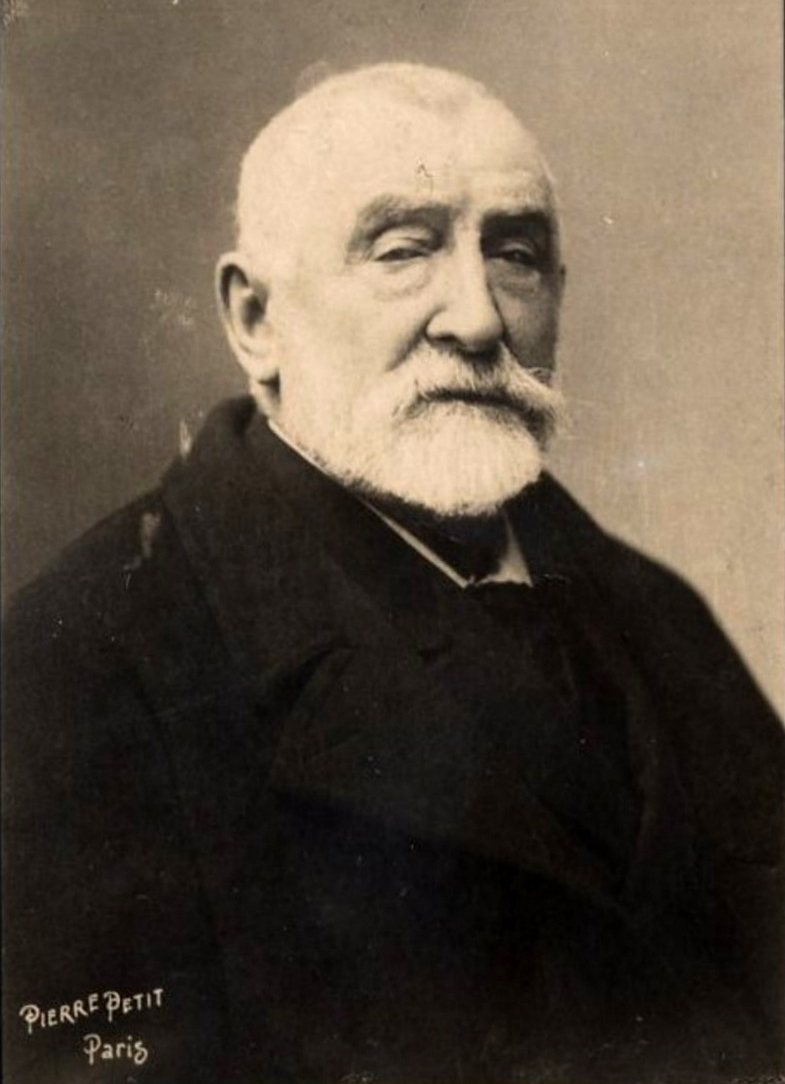
Henri Harpignies

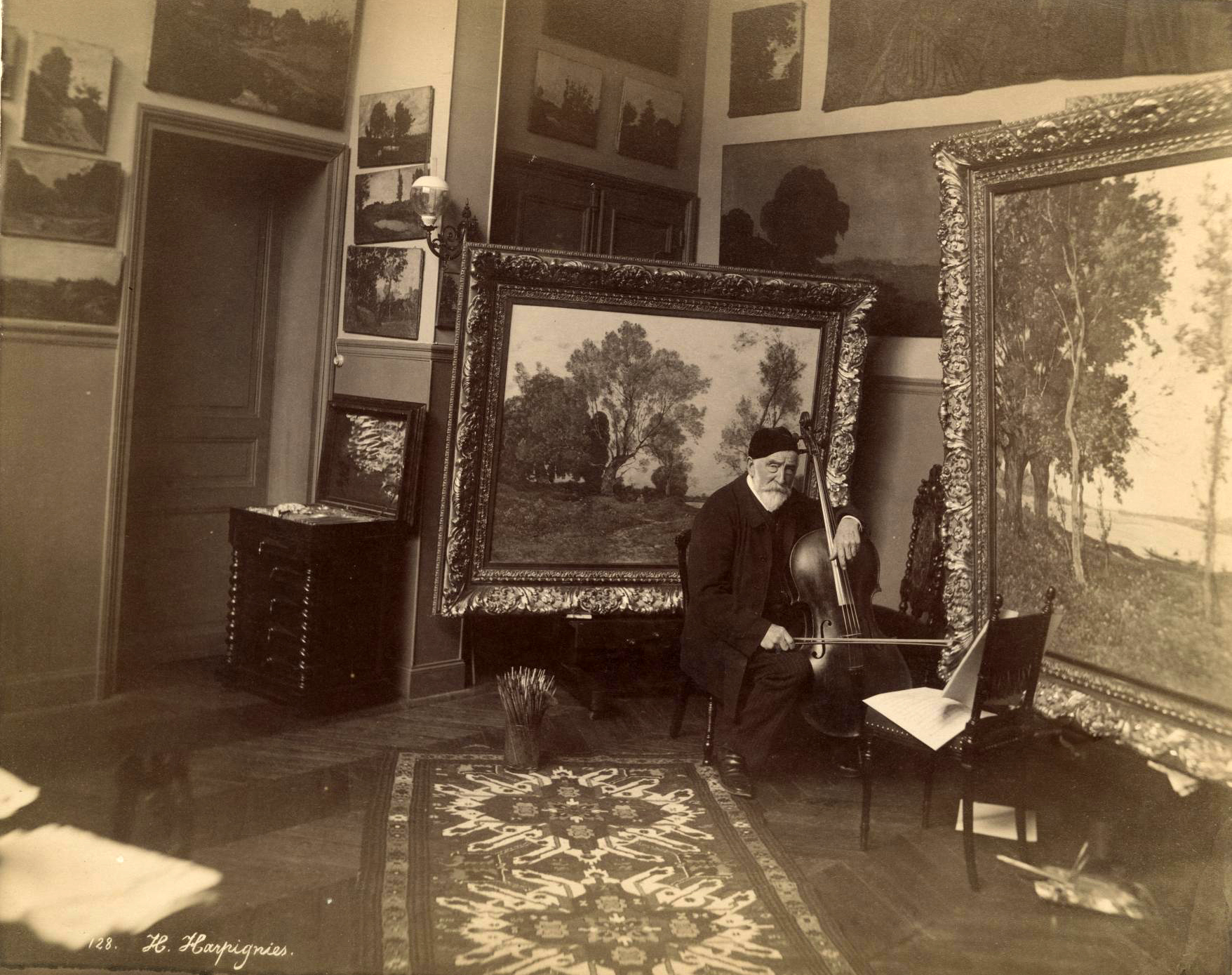
Henri Harpignies

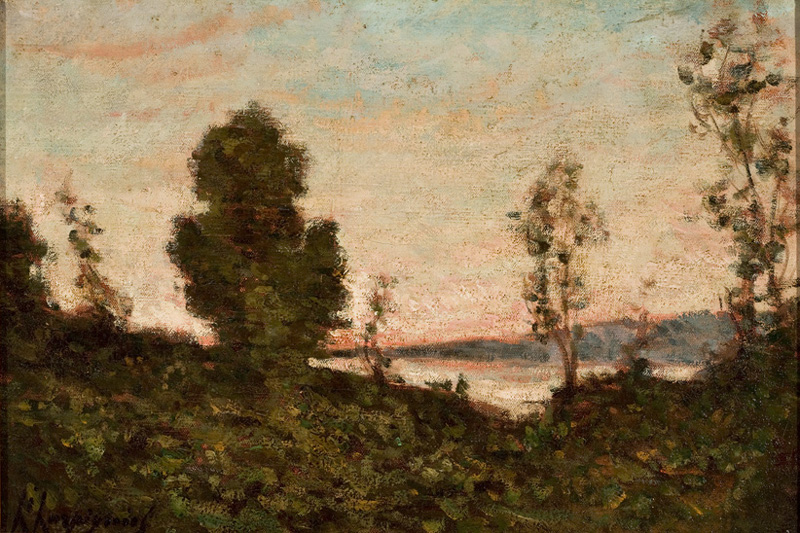
Landscape by Harpignies at Museu de Arte de São Paulo, Brazil

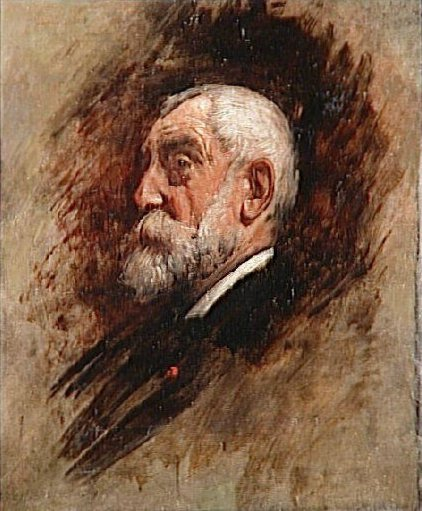
Portrait of Harpignies by Léon Bonnat

Henri-Joseph Harpignies (French pronunciation: [ɑ̃ʁi ʒozɛf aʁpiɲi]; June 28, 1819 – August 28, 1916) was a French landscape painter of the Barbizon school.

Though his main exhibited works were oil paintings, by French standards he took watercolour painting unusually seriously, and was also a printmaker.

== Life ==
He was born at Valenciennes. His parents intended for him to pursue a business career, but his determination to become an artist was so strong that it conquered all obstacles, and he was allowed at the age of twenty-seven to enter Jean Achard's atelier in Paris. From this painter he acquired a groundwork of sound constructive draughtsmanship, which is so marked a feature of his landscape painting. After two years under this exacting teacher he went to Italy, whence he returned in 1850.

During the next few years he devoted himself to the painting of children in landscape setting, and fell in with Corot and the other Barbizon masters, whose principles and methods are to a certain extent reflected in his own personal art. To Corot he was united by a bond of warm friendship, and the two artists went together to Italy in 1860.

On his return, he scored his first great success at the Salon, in 1861, with his Lisière de bois sur les bords de l'Allier. After that year he was a regular exhibitor at the old Salon; in 1886 he received his first medal for Le Soir dans la campagne de Rome, which was acquired for the Luxembourg Gallery.

Many of his best works were painted at Hérisson in the central France region of Bourbonnais, as well as in the Nivernais and Auvergne regions. Among his chief pictures are:

- Soir sur les bords de la Loire (1861)
- Les Corbeaux (1865)
- Le Soir (1866)
- Le Saut-du-Loup (1873)
- La Loire (1882)
- Vue de Saint-Privé (1883).

He also did some decorative work for the Paris Opéra—the Vallée d'Egérie panel, which he showed at the Salon of 1870.

He had numerous students, among them Émile Appay (1876–1935), James Wilson Morrice (1865–1924), Jeanne Rongier, Jane Le Soudier (1885–1976), Louis-Alexandre Cabié, Pierre Vignal, Raymond Verdun, and Émile Dardoize (1826–1901).

As well as French museums, his works are found in many British and American collections.
