= Lac de l'Eychauda =

Lake in France

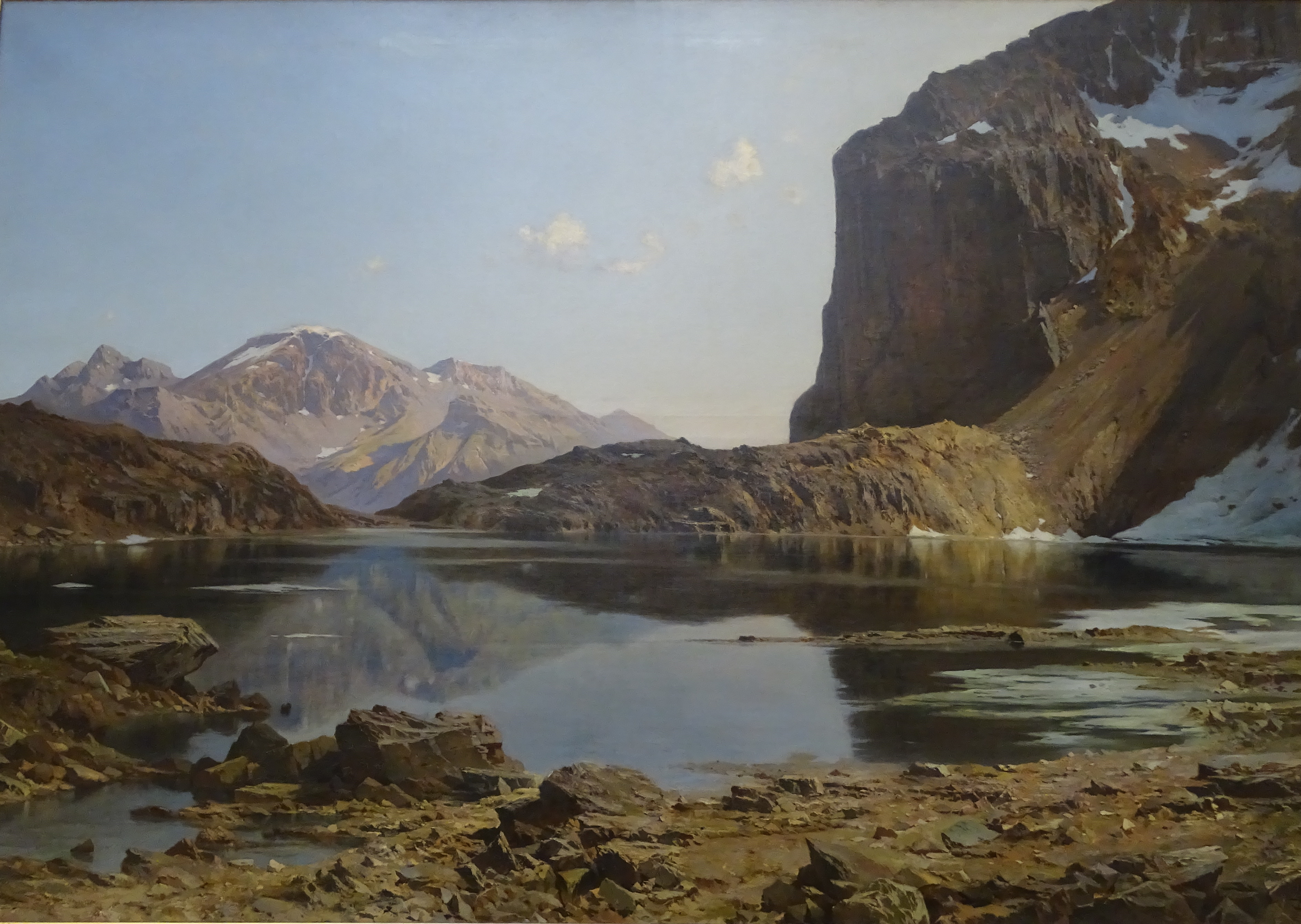
- Laurent Guétal (1886), Museum of Grenoble

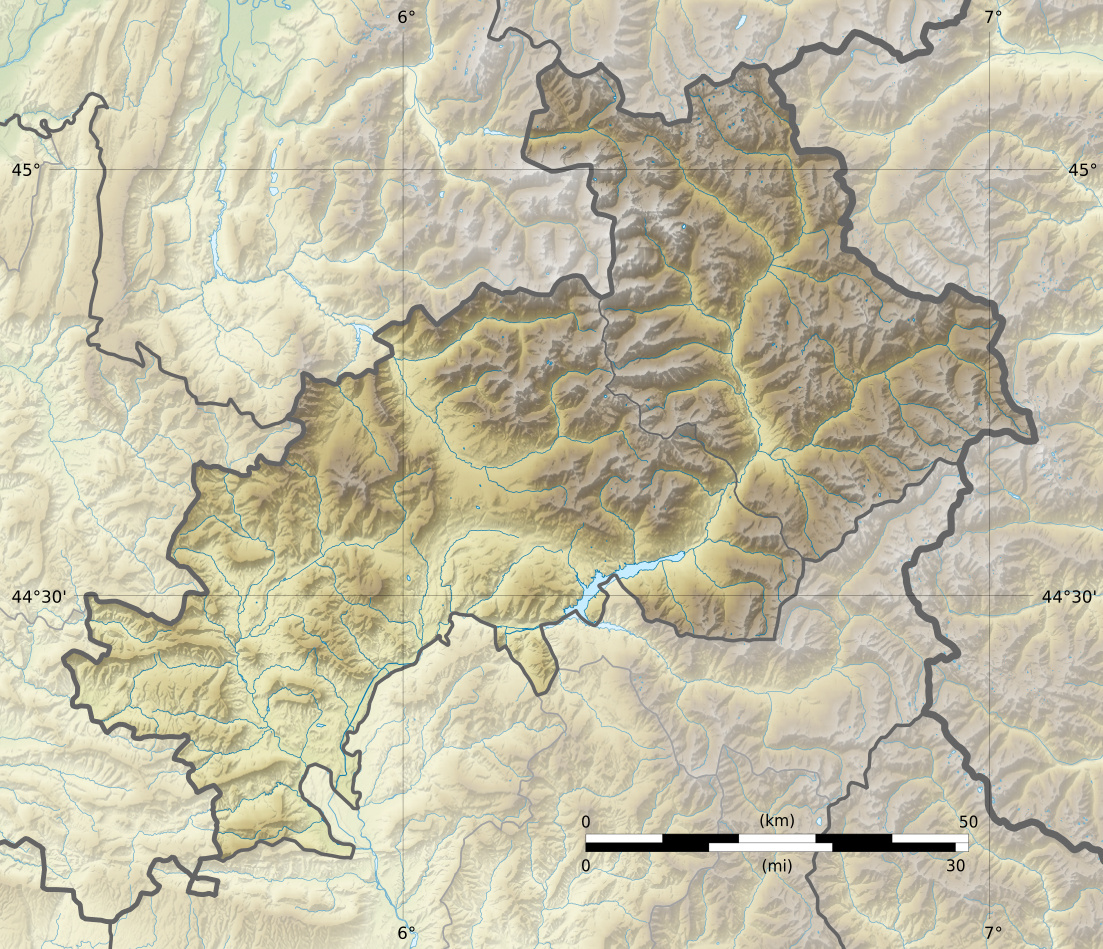
- Location within Hautes-Alpes
- Location: Pelvoux, Hautes-Alpes
- Coordinates: 44.932°N 6.478°E
- Primary inflows: Glacier Seguret-Foran
- Basin countries: France
- Surface area: 15 ha (37 acres)
- Max. depth: 23 m (75 ft)
- Surface elevation: 2,514 m (8,248 ft)
- Frozen: 9 months

Lake Eychauda (French: Lac de l'Eychauda) is a lake in the Alps, Hautes-Alpes, France.

It is a two-hour detour from the GR54 path. It is a common day hike from Vallouise.
