= Isidore Dagnan =

French painter

- Born: October 1794; Marseille, France
- Died: 8 November 1873 (aged 79); Paris
- Known for: Landscape painting

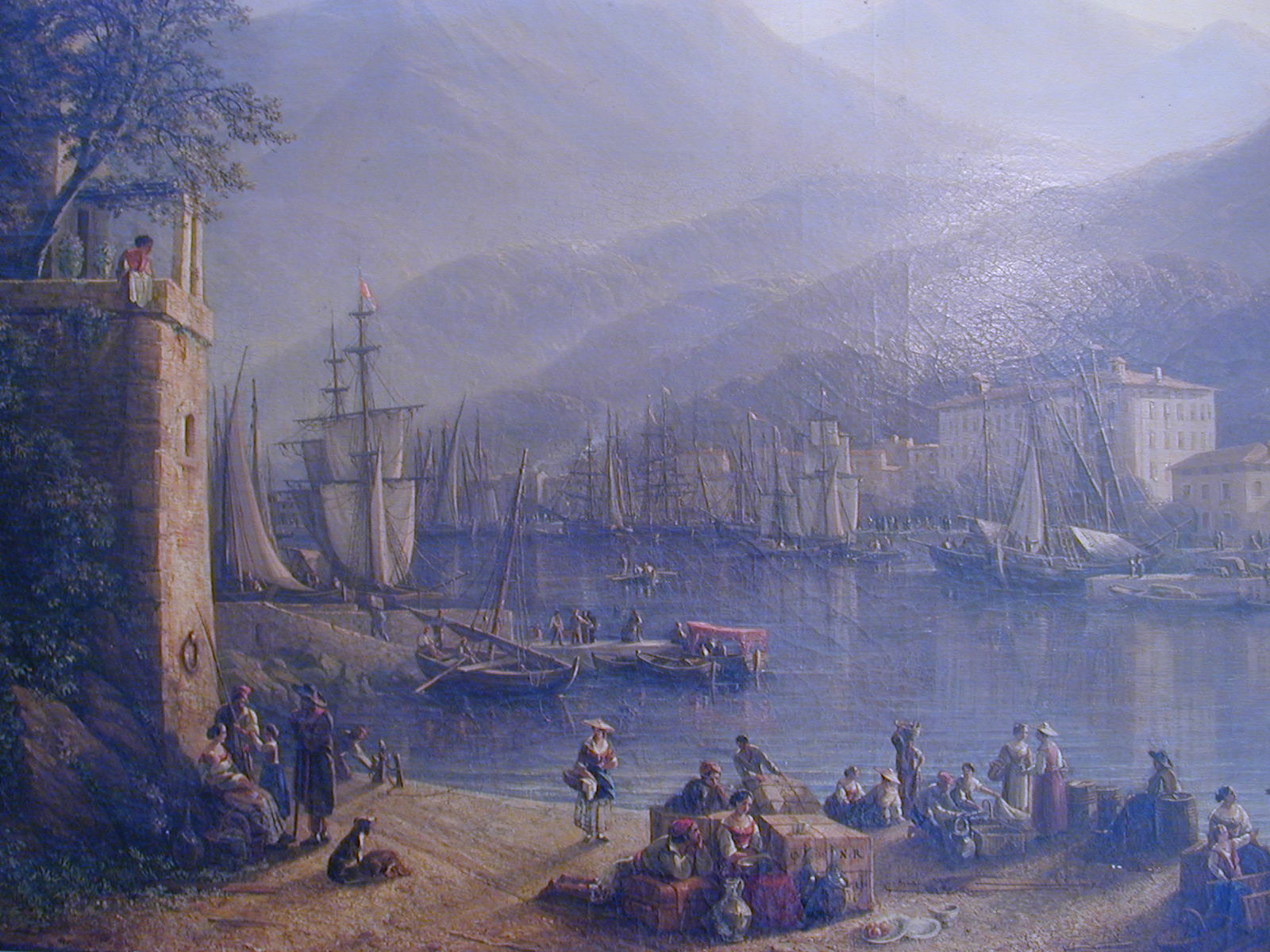
Ancien port of Nice, now in the municipal museum of Orange, Vaucluse

Isidore Dagnan, a French landscape painter, was born at Marseille in 1794, and died in Paris in 1873. His pictures consist chiefly of views in Southern France, Italy, and Switzerland. His works include the following:

- Fontainebleau. Palace. View of Lausanne, 1822; View in Dauphiné. 1827.
- Versailles. Trianon. Lake of Geneva, 1822;View of Paris from the Quai de la Cité, 1831 (one of his best works); Banks of the Vigne near Vaucluse; Valley of the Lauterbrunnen, 1841; Petrarch's House; Old Beeches in the Forest of Fontainebleau.
