= Théodore Ravanat =

French painter

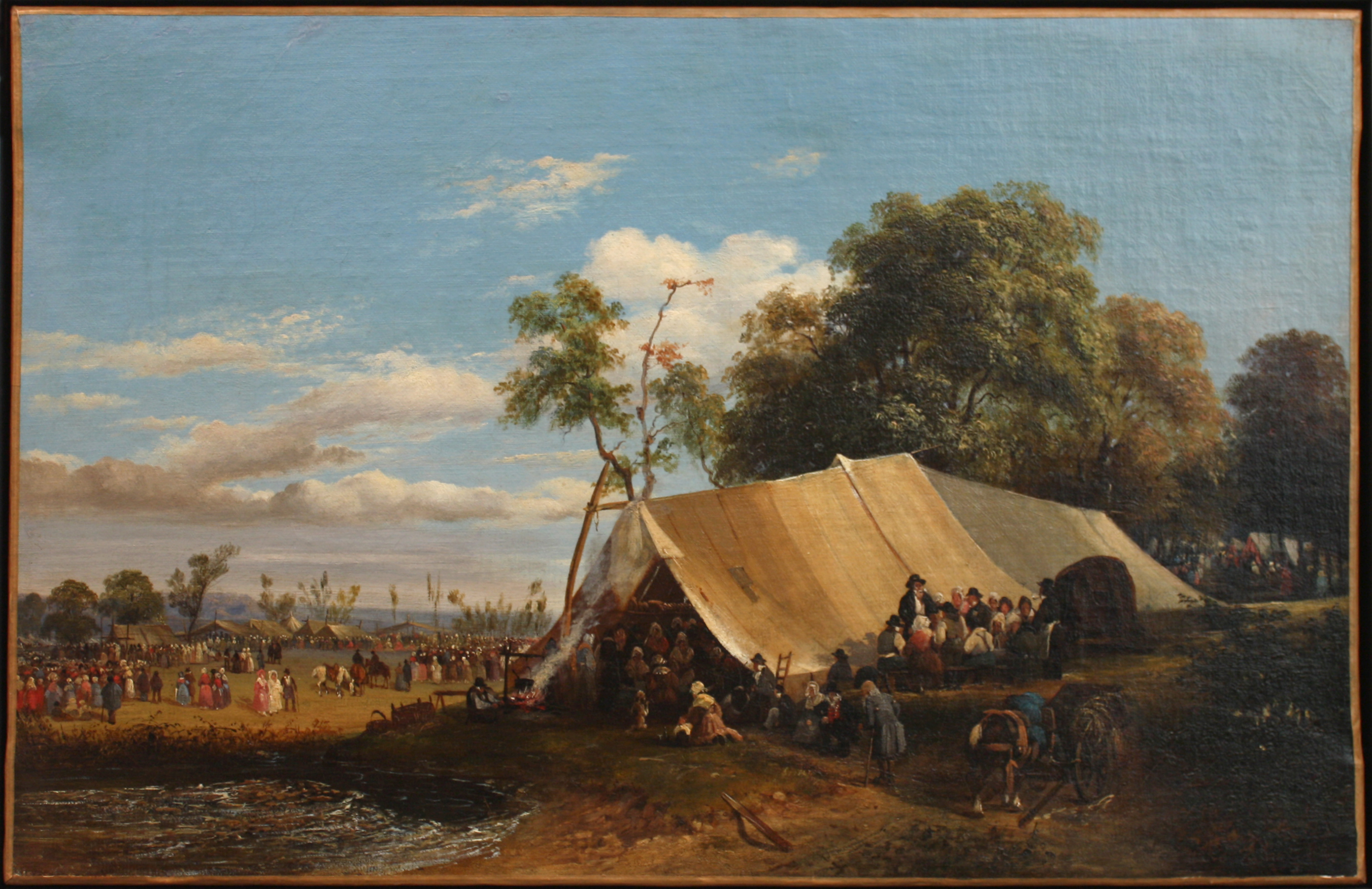
La foire de Beaucroissant, by Ravanat, Musée dauphinois

Théodore Ravanat (born in Grenoble on 4 May 1812, died in Proveysieux on 21 September 1883) was a French landscape painter. Ravanat's work is mostly composed of Dauphiné landscapes. His paintings are generally among private collections of Grenoble, but some of these paintings can be seen at the Museum of Grenoble or the Musée dauphinois.

== Biography ==
Ravant received his first artistic advice by Jean Achard. He was friend with Ernest Hébert, sculptor Victor Sappey, and the most of painters who attended the École dauphinoise.

He began exhibiting his painting Souvenir de Vienne in 1832 in Grenoble, then he continued to show his works the next years. From 1843 to 1845, he exhibited at the Salon de Paris. He began a trip to Italy and returned to Grenoble in 1846. He was appointed assistant of the Musée de Grenoble, Professor, then Director of the municipal school of drawing. In 1880, he moved to Proveysieux, and he received his painter friends in the barn-workshop he rented. This gathering was sometimes called "École de Proveyzieux".

Ravanat was the subject of a painting by Eugène Faure and a medal by Victor Sappey.

== Bibliography ==
- Nathalie Servonnat-Favier, catalogue of the exhibition Peintre(s) à Proveysieux, Grenoble, 2003
- Maurice Wantellet, Deux siècles et plus de peinture dauphinoise, Grenoble, 1987, 269 p. (ISBN 2-9502223-0-7)
- Gérald Schurr and Pierre Cabanne, Dictionnaire des Petits Maîtres de la peinture, 1820–1920, Paris, Amateur editions, 2008
