= Proveysieux =

Proveysieux Provèsiô (Arpitan)
- Commune
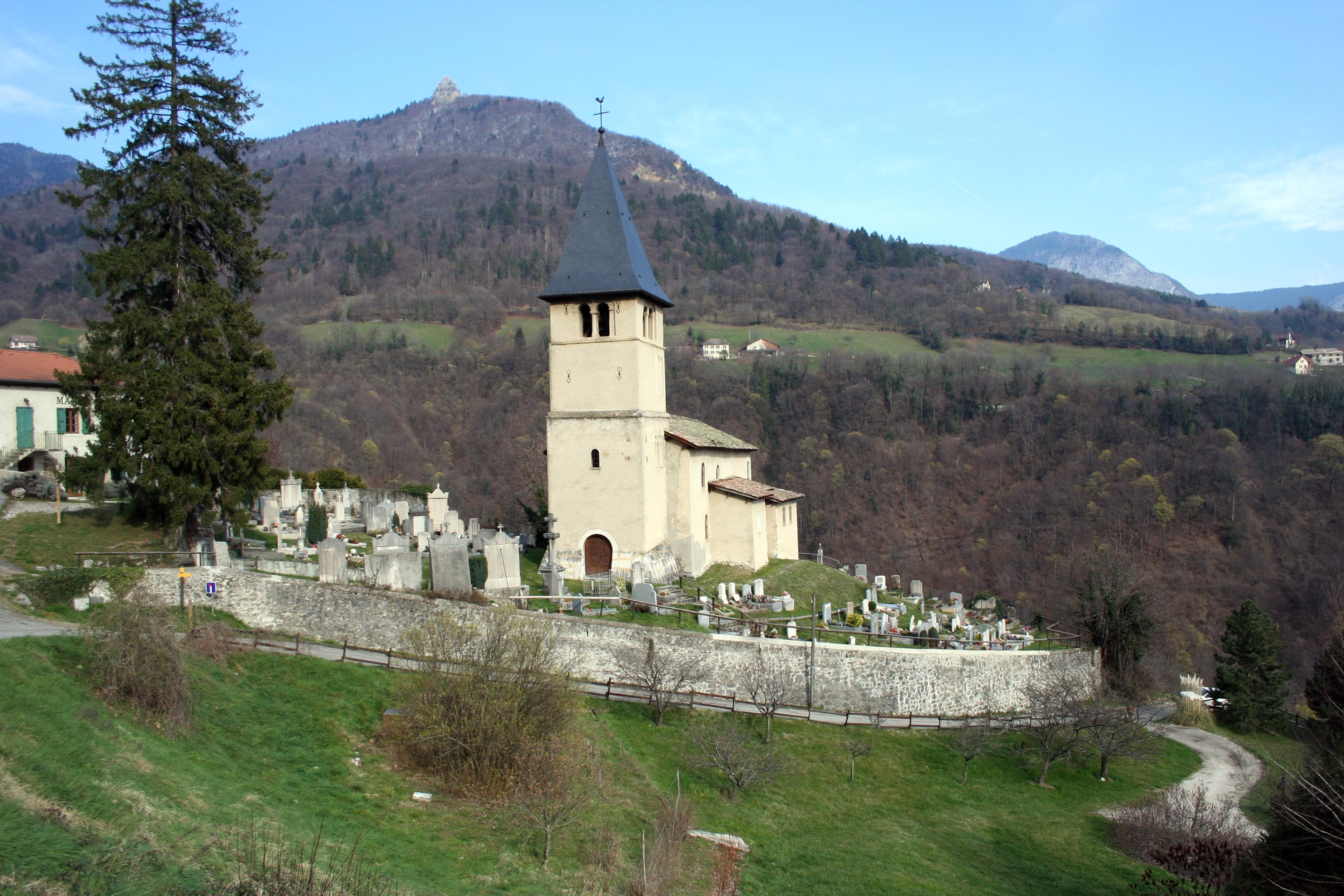
- The church of Proveysieux
- Location of Proveysieux
- Location within France Location within Auvergne-Rhône-Alpes
- Coordinates: 45°15′49″N 5°42′00″E
- Country: France
- Region: Auvergne-Rhône-Alpes
- Department: Isère
- Arrondissement: Grenoble
- Canton: Grenoble-2
- Intercommunality: Grenoble-Alpes Métropole

Government
  - Mayor (2020–2026): Christian Balestrieri
- Area^{1}: 20 km^{2} (7.7 sq mi)
- Elevation: 600 m (2,000 ft)
- Highest elevation: 1,844 m (6,050 ft)
- Lowest elevation: 264 m (866 ft)
- Population (2023): 522
  - Density: 26/km^{2} (68/sq mi)
- Time zone: UTC+01:00 (CET)
  - Summer (DST): UTC+02:00 (CEST)
- INSEE/Postal code: 38325 /38120
- ^{1} French Land Register data, which excludes lakes, ponds, glaciers > 1 km^{2} (0.386 sq mi or 247 acres) and river estuaries.

Proveysieux (French pronunciation: [pʁɔvɛzjø]; Arpitan: Provèsiô) is a commune in the Isère department in southeastern France.

== Population ==
Historical population
Year	Pop.	±% p.a.
1968	218	—
1975	260	+2.55%
1982	355	+4.55%
1990	469	+3.54%
1999	479	+0.23%
2007	515	+0.91%
2012	513	−0.08%
2017	507	−0.24%
2023	522	+0.49%
Source: INSEE

== See also ==
- Communes of the Isère department
- Néron (Isère)
