= Musée dauphinois =

Museum in Grenoble, France

Coordinates: 45.19513°N 5.72668°E

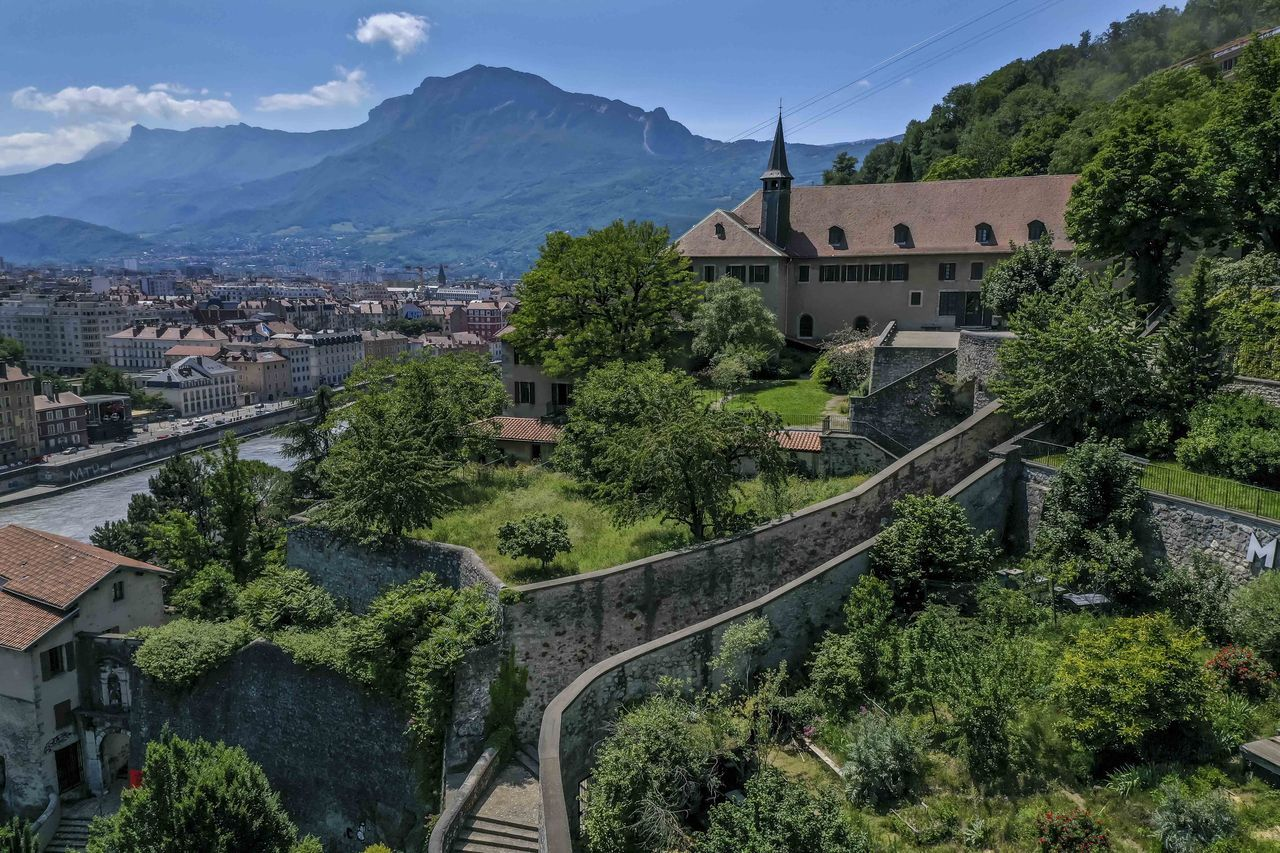
- The museum and its gardens © Jack Trebor Prod

- Location within France
- Established: 1906
- Location: 30 rue Maurice Gignoux, Grenoble, France
- Collection size: 100,000 objects
- Visitors: 84,195 (2018)
- Founder: Hippolyte Müller
- Curator: Olivier Cogne
- Website: Musée dauphinois

The Musée dauphinois (Dauphinois Museum), located in Grenoble (France), is dedicated to the ethnography, archaeology, history and society of the former province of Dauphiné, encompassing the current departments of Isère, Drôme, and Hautes-Alpes. Situated above the neighbourhood of Saint-Laurent in the listed historic monument of Sainte-Marie d’en-Haut, the Musée dauphinois is an accredited “Musée de France“ (Museum of France) and takes part in the Long Night of Museums.

Founded in 1906, the Musée dauphinois was the third museum in Grenoble, after the Musée-bibliotèque and the Musée d’histoire naturelle. The museum has occupied two different historical 17th century buildings: the former chapel of Sainte-Marie d’en-Bas from 1906 to 1968, and the present site of the former convent of Sainte-Marie d’en-Haut. It is one of the first museums in France dedicated to regional cultural heritage (following the Museon Arlaten, founded by Frédéric Mistral).

Each year, its temporary exhibition spaces showcase diverse displays, creating an important centre for regional culture in Grenoble. In 2004, a temporary exhibition exploring the treasures of Ancient Egypt helped the museum surpass over 100,000 annual visitors.

== History ==
=== Founding & Early Development ===
On 13 October 1905, the regional newspaper, La Dépêche dauphinoise, reported that a commission had met to study the creation of a history museum in Grenoble. On 27 January 1906, a report authored by the municipal architect was sent to the mayor of Grenoble, Charles Rivail, proposing the construction of an ethnographic museum in the former chapel of Sainte-Marie d’en-Bas. Later that year, on 14 December, the aforementioned advisory commission elected the celebrated ethnographer Hippolyte Müller as the first curator of the museum. The name Musée dauphinois, suggested by fellow commission member and archivist Auguste Prudhomme, was finalized by on 25 March 1907. The commission would additionally oversee decisions concerning the functioning, organisation, and pricing of the museum. Following the deliberation of Grenoble's municipal council on 13 April 1908, a presidential decree was signed by Armand Fallières on 6 April 1910, offering a provisional loan of 4,800 francs to the city to pay for the museum's installation costs.

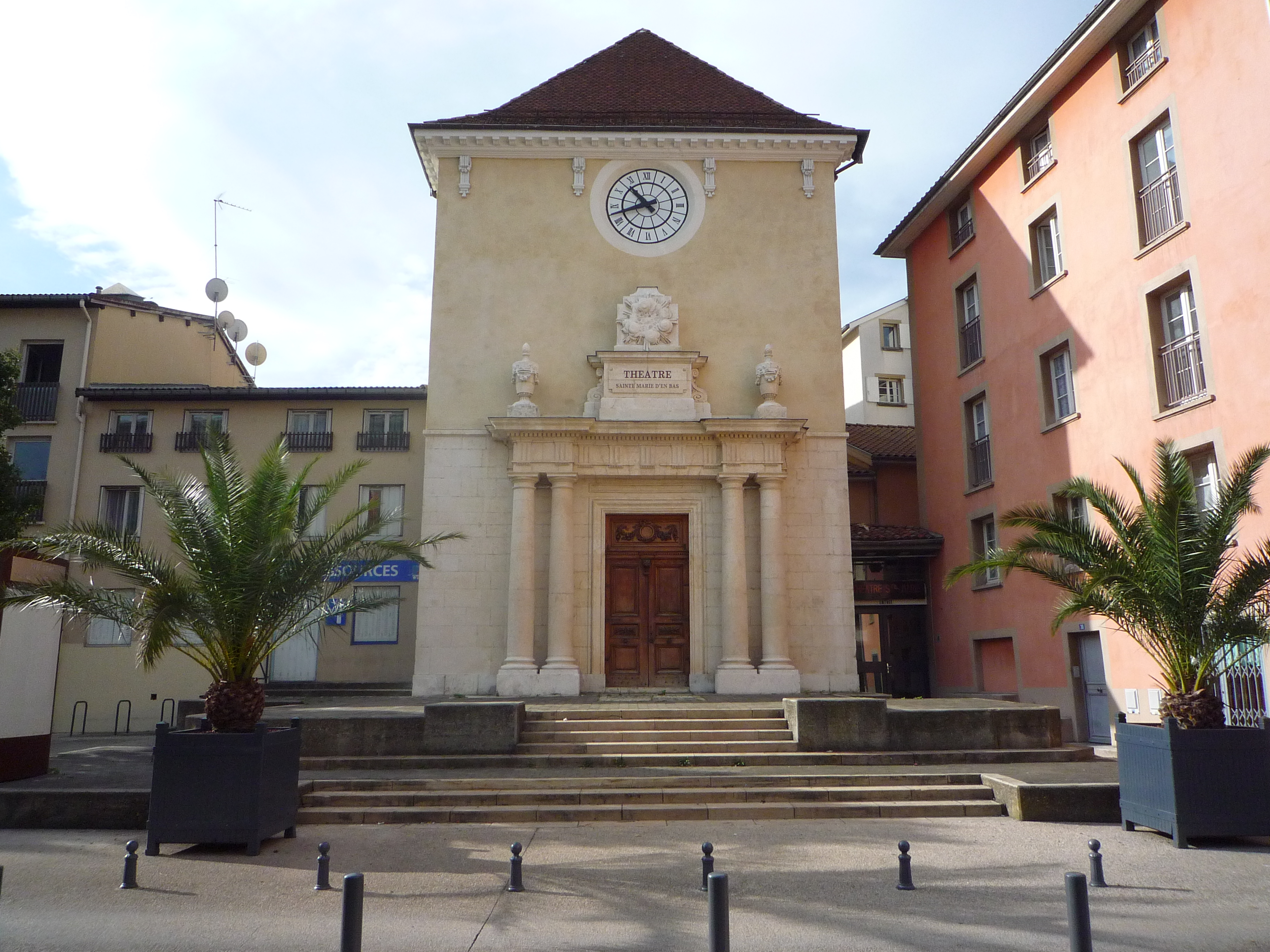
The chapel of Sainte-Marie d'en-Bas, the former site of the Musée dauphinois.

The museum was first located in the chapel of Sainte-Marie d’en-Bas, Rue Très-Cloîtres, which originally belonged to the sisters of the Order of the Visitation of Holy Mary. However, in 1647, the sisters constructed a new, more spacious convent and chapel on the left bank of the Isère River, retaining the original name of Sainte-Marie d’en-Bas.

The original chapel was entirely rebuilt in 1786, but fell into disuse after the passage of the 1905 French law on the Separation of the Churches and the State. It was in this chapel—engraved in 1907 with the inscription Musée dauphinois—that Müller gathered objects and documents depicting the daily life of the inhabitants in the Alps. These cultural artifacts were compiled from his own various excavations, most notably in the Queyras Valley of Dauphiné. The artifacts included prehistorical items, decorative arts dating from the Gallo-Roman period through the 19th century, and objects depicting the region's industrial history. In the summer of 1921, Müller and his counterpart at the Musée de Grenoble (Museum of Grenoble), Andry-Farcy, agreed to divide these objects between the two museums. In 1921, all small objects of archaeological interest were transferred to the Musée dauphinois, with larger items such as Gallo-Roman gravestones arriving the following year. These gravestones were displayed on a closed-off terrace, which is now a wide staircase. An expert on local heritage, Müller helped construct a life-sized replica of the alpine village Saint-Véran in 1925, during the International Exhibition of Hydropower and Tourism in Grenoble.

=== Relocation & Expansion ===
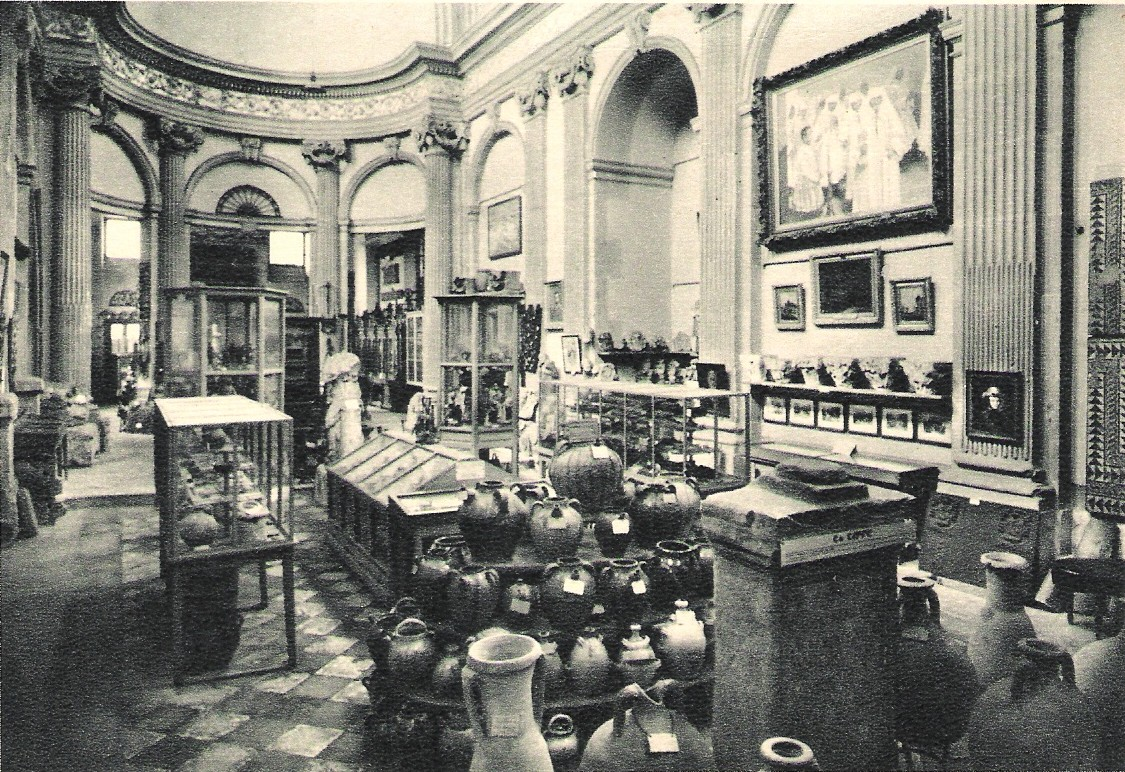
An exhibition room in the chapel of Sainte-Marie d’en-Bas, the former site of the Musée dauphinois.

However, faced with a growing collection of artifacts, the lack of space in the museum soon became evident and by the end of the 1940s, the museum had started to consider finding larger premises. The director of the “Musées de France” (Museums of France) appealed to the then mayor, Léon Martin, to find a “more dignified [space] for a city of great tourism like Grenoble.” In 1949, the site of the disused Convent of Sainte-Marie-d'en-Haut on the right bank of the river was suggested as a possible location; however, the relocation project would take almost two decades to complete.

Encouraged by favourable economic conditions and the upcoming 10th Winter Olympic Games, the new town council, led by then city mayor Hubert Dubedout and deputy mayor Bernard Gilman, decided to relocate the museum to the much larger site of Sainte-Marie d’en-Haut in 1965. Gilman would later name Marcel Boulin as the museum's curator. Following the death of Müller in 1933, leadership of the museum passed to his son-in-law Joseph Colomb and afterwards, gallery owner and antique dealer, Joseph Laforge.

On 3 February 1968, the museum, now in the partially restored former convent, was unveiled by the Minister of Cultural Affairs, André Malraux. The next day, Dubedout presented the location of the museum to General Charles de Gaulle using a giant model of the city. Gilman, however, was displeased with the expositions organized for the grand opening, and would personally recruit a new curator for the museum: Jean-Pierre Laurent, then employed at the Musée-château d'Annecy. Formally assuming his position in 1971, he sought to redesign the museum's presentation, seeking to showcase the lives of the region's inhabitants. Guided by the principle of "Man Finds Himself," Laurent designed novel exhibitions such as "Axe and Cabinetmakers in Grenoble," "The Glovemaker's Hand," "Children of the Mountains," "The Story of the People of Grenoble" and "The Chartreux, the Desert, and the World." These exhibitions, commemorating the region's rich artisanal history, placed local residents at the "heart" of the museum's curatorial process. Laurent was supported by Charles Joisten, the founder of Le Monde alpin et rhodanien, a local ethnological journal.

After its first exhibition, which welcomed 36,000 visitors, the museum was closed for several months in order to finish the restoration of the building. Finally, on 27 June 1970, and with the convent fully restored, the museum opened for a second time. Visitors to the museum discovered an exhibition space that was designed personally by the Laurent. In 1981, Jean Guibal and Jean-Claude Duclos were named as the museum's successors, charged with following Laurent's footsteps and realizing his vision.

=== Institutional Development & Cultural Preservation Efforts ===
In 1989, the museum acquired a new 2,000m^{2} building along the quay of the Isère River, providing a new workshop and storeroom close to the museum's grounds. In 1992, responsibility for the Musée dauphinois passed from the city of Grenoble to the departmental council of the Isère, where it became a service of the Direction of Culture and Heritage. Already supporting various local museums, the council administered the safekeeping of specially reserved collections as well as the renovation or creation of establishments in over a dozen different municipalities, notably La Mure, Mens, Aoste, Bressieux, Charavines, Allevard, Saint-Chef, and Hières-sur-Amby. Adopting an ecomuseological framework (see: Ecomuseum), the Musée dauphinois became a hub for public service, initially serving municipalities and their elected officials, but later extending its support to cultural organizations in the region. Collaborating with a team of architects and archeologists from the Centre d'archéologie historique des musées de Grenoble et de l'Isère (CAHMGI), the Musée dauphinois launched systematic inventories to document the heritage of certain territories. In 1998, the Musée de l'Ancien Évêché was founded to present these projects to the public. The Musée Dauphinois would later become the headquarters for an even more ambitious mission: preserving and showcasing the cultural heritage of the entire Isère region. The success of this endeavor would eventually lead to the implementation of new protocol by the French Ministry of Culture and the Department of Isère's cultural service, the CPI. Seeking to decentralize cultural preservation efforts and work more closely with local communities, the CPI would oversee regional projects for the next twelve years. However, the departmental council of Isère would later discontinue this service, entrusting its responsibilities with local museums instead.

In 2004, the museum set a record for its highest number of annual visitors with 107,398 museum goers, largely thanks to an exhibition on the treasures of Ancient Egypt that coincided with the 9th International Congress of Egyptologists in Grenoble. In 2012, the museum welcomed 92,997 visitors. In 2016, the museum housed 76,413 visitors, but typically averages around 60,000 per year.

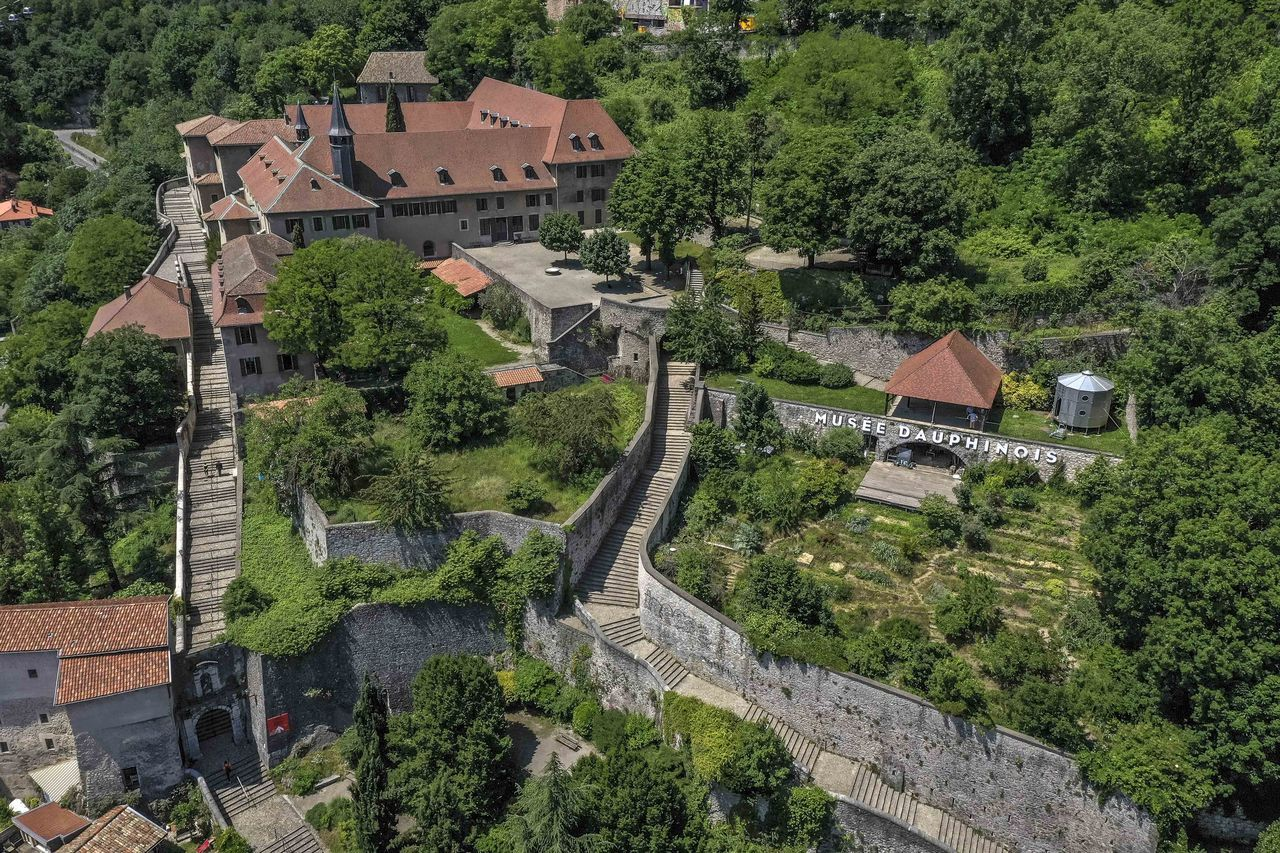
The Musée dauphinois in 2020 © Jack Trebor Prod.

In 2017, the Musée dauphinois, with the collaboration of the Musée de la Révolution française and the Musée de l'Ancien Évêché, took part in L’année Lesdiguières (the Year of Lesdiguières), a retrospective about the Lesdiguières dynasty—a family of politically influential men from the Dauphiné region during the 11th and 12th century. This exposition was concluded by a conference from 25 to 27 October.

On 6 February 2018, to celebrate the 50th anniversary of the Winter Olympic Games in Grenoble, the museum welcomed reputed athletes from the era such as Jean-Claude Killy, Marielle Goitschel, Alain Calmat, Léo Lacroix, Patrick Péra, Guy Périllat and Franco Nones. In October 2019, Jean-Pierre Barbier, the president of the Department of Isère, unveiled plans to redevelop the museum's gardens ahead of the 400th anniversary of the Convent of Sainte-Marie d'en-Haut.

=== Present ===
The Musée dauphinois is currently directed by Olivier Cogne, a historian and archivist by trade. He has previously served as the director of the Musée de la Résistance et de la Déportation de l'Isère. Through expositions such as Égyptomania, Rose Valland, Nunavik, and L'ivresse des sommets: eaux de vie et liqueurs des Alpes, the museum continues to explore the connection between contemporary history and cultural heritage. In 2023, the Direction of Culture and Heritage, associated with the Department of Isère, spearheaded a collaboration between twelve regional museums—including the Musée dauphinois—organizing a communal storage space for their collections. This endeavour included a joint construction effort as well as the restoration and digitization of certain documents.

== History of Sainte-Marie d’en-Haut ==
=== Origins ===
The Convent of the Order of the Visitation of Holy Mary was founded during the Counter-Reformation of the 17th century. The congregation, reserved for women, was created in 1610 by Saint Francis de Sales and Saint Jane Frances de Chantal, who established the order's fourth house in Grenoble, naming it the convent of Sainte-Marie d’en-Haut.

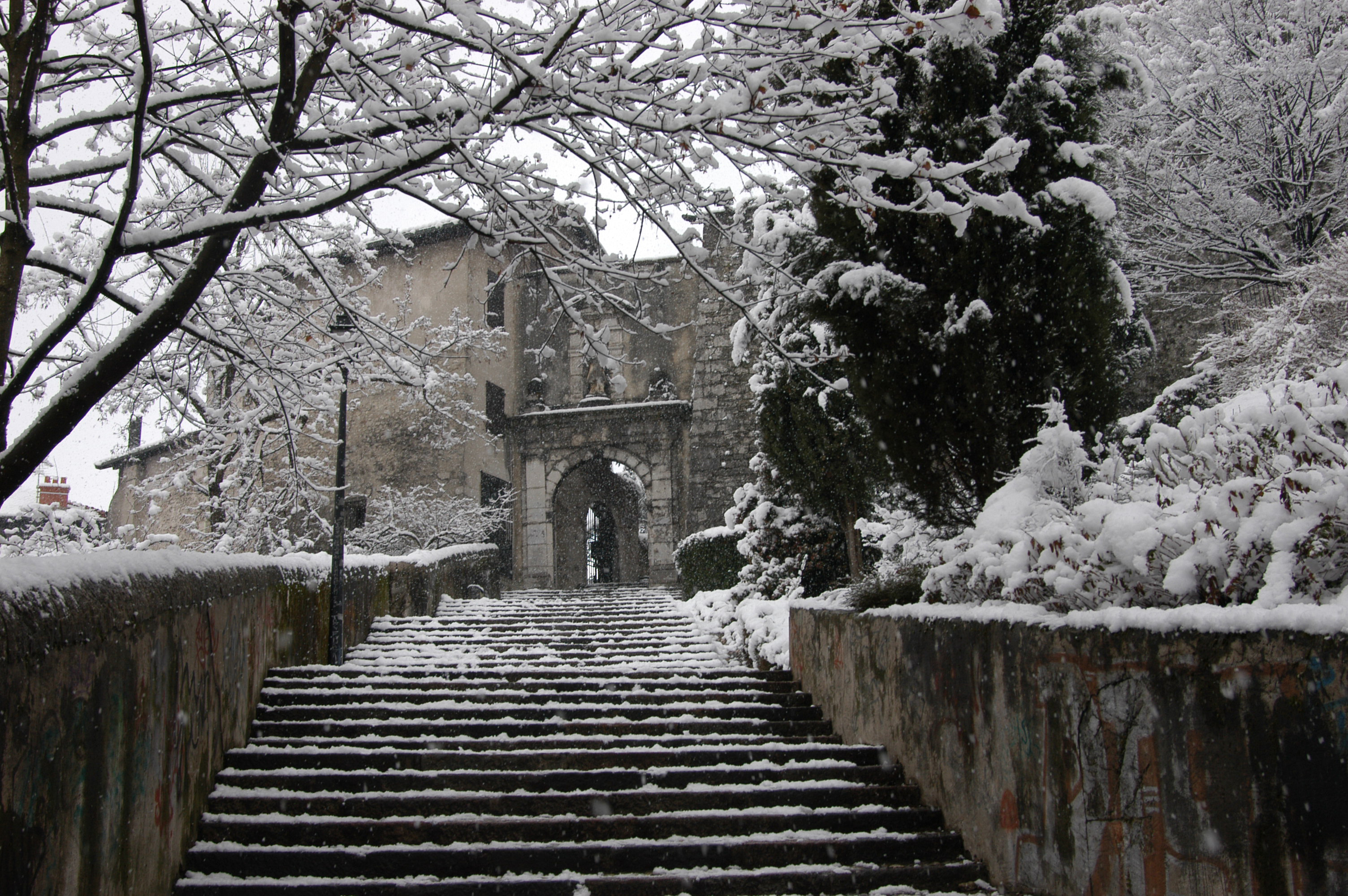
The montée Chalemont.

In 1619, fortifications, ordered by François de Bonne, the Duke of Lesdiguières, were erected on the Bastille Hill of Grenoble. Just three months later, on 21 October, the first brick of the convent was laid along the montée Chalemont (the Chalemont Climb) on the lower slopes of this very hill. The initial bricklaying was overseen by the Bishop Alphonse de La Croix de Chevrières and the young Christine of France, who had recently married the Crown Prince of Savoy. The convent was completed in the autumn of 1621. Two centuries earlier, the montée Chalemont had been the principal gateway into the city. However, this road, established during the Gallo-Roman period, was replaced by a new road cutting into the cliffside along the banks of the Isère. In 1620, Lesdiguières directed the construction of a new gate called the Porte de France (Gate of France) to commemorate the new entryway into the city.

=== Occupants ===
Over the years, this convent welcomed a series of occupants. In 1791, during the French Revolution, it became a national asset and was transformed into a jail for anti-revolutionaries, including important local figures such as Chérubin Beyle, father of the writer Stendhal; the lawyer and politician Antoine Barnave; the cabinetmaker Jean-François Hache; the Chartreux Fathers; and refractory priests. In 1804, nuns of the Order of the Holy Heart, led by Rose Philippine Duchesne, settled in the convent and devoted their time to educating young girls until their departure in 1832. The following year, the sisters of the Providence of Corenc established a primary school in the building.

On 1 December 1851, the Ursulines arrived at the convent where they stayed until their expulsion in April 1905. The fixtures and furnishings of the convent were put up for public auction that same month. After being acquired by the city of Grenoble, the building was used as an army barrack from 1906 to 1920. Due to a shortage of public housing, the city of Grenoble used the former convent to house 150 Italian families until the late 1950s. The building was then briefly occupied by students from the Grenoble School of Architecture, before being renovated by the city in 1966.

=== Architecture ===
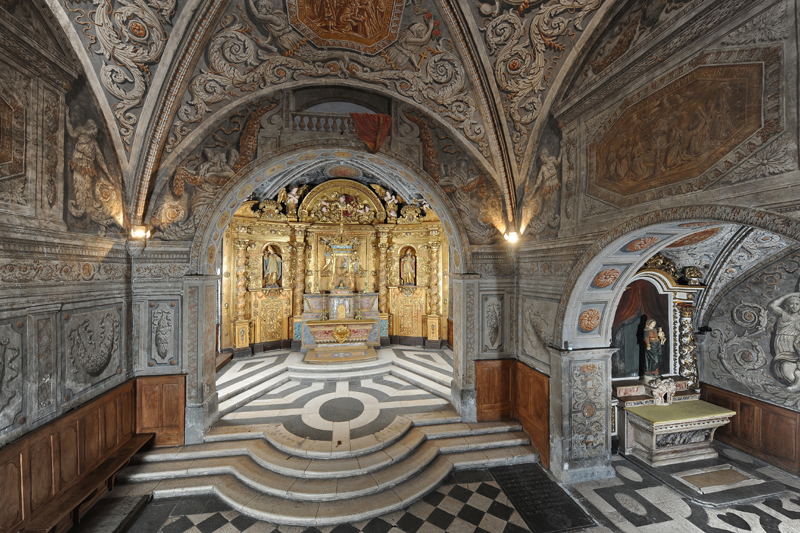
The chapel of Sainte-Marie d'en-Haut.

Most of the convent has been preserved, including the cloister; the choir where Visitandine nuns attended masses from behind a metal grating; and the richly decorated baroque chapel. This chapel is accessible by a long, vaulted corridor from the nuns’ choir, which was built perpendicularly to the chapel to ensure that the nuns were invisible to worshipers. The saint Jane Francis de Chantal was kneeling in front of the choir's grating on 16 December 1622 when she received the revelation of Francis de Sales’ death.

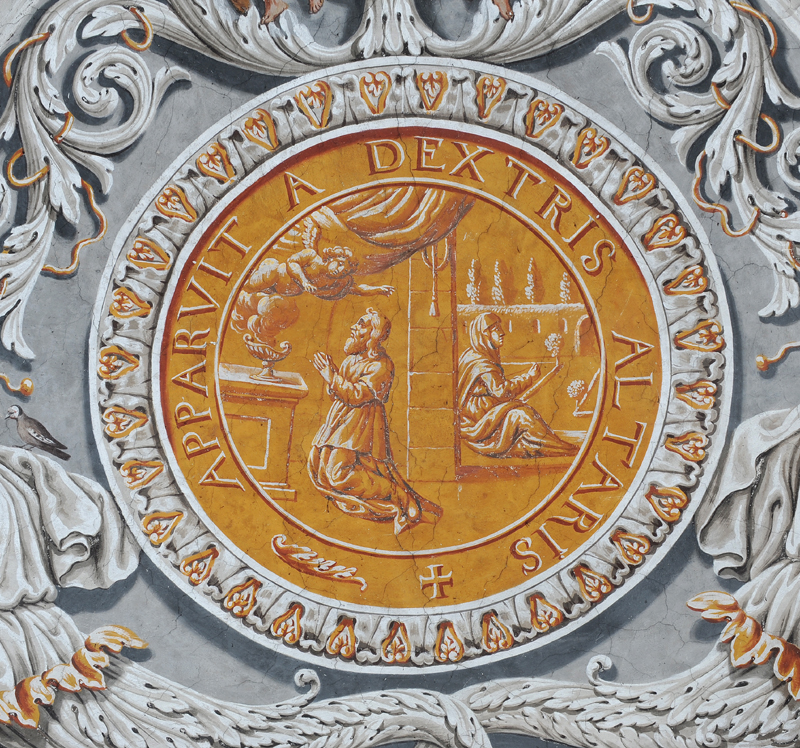
A painting from the chapel's ceiling.

A true museum within a museum, the Chapel of the Visitation is a jewel of French baroque art. The murals were painted by artist Toussaint Largeot. Their completion in 1662 coincided with the celebration of the beatification of Francis de Sales, organised by the Jesuit father Claude-François Ménestrier. The ceiling is decorated with various religious scenes which were relevant to worshippers during the 17th century. Among these scenes is a depiction of the laying of the convent's first stone. However, over the time, the significance of these paintings have been lost. Fortunately, an interactive multimedia guide now allows visitors to better understand the work and context of the Order of the Visitation of Holy Mary. The chapel also contains a gilded wooden altarpiece whose construction began in 1622, owing to the generosity of François de Bonne de Créqui, Governor of Grenoble and Lesdiguières’ grandson. The altar was built a century later by the Tuscan sculptor François Tanzi in 1747 to celebrate the beatification of Jane de Chantal. A small lateral chapel is decorated with pictures depicting the life of Francis de Sales.

=== Notre-Dame d'en-Haut ===
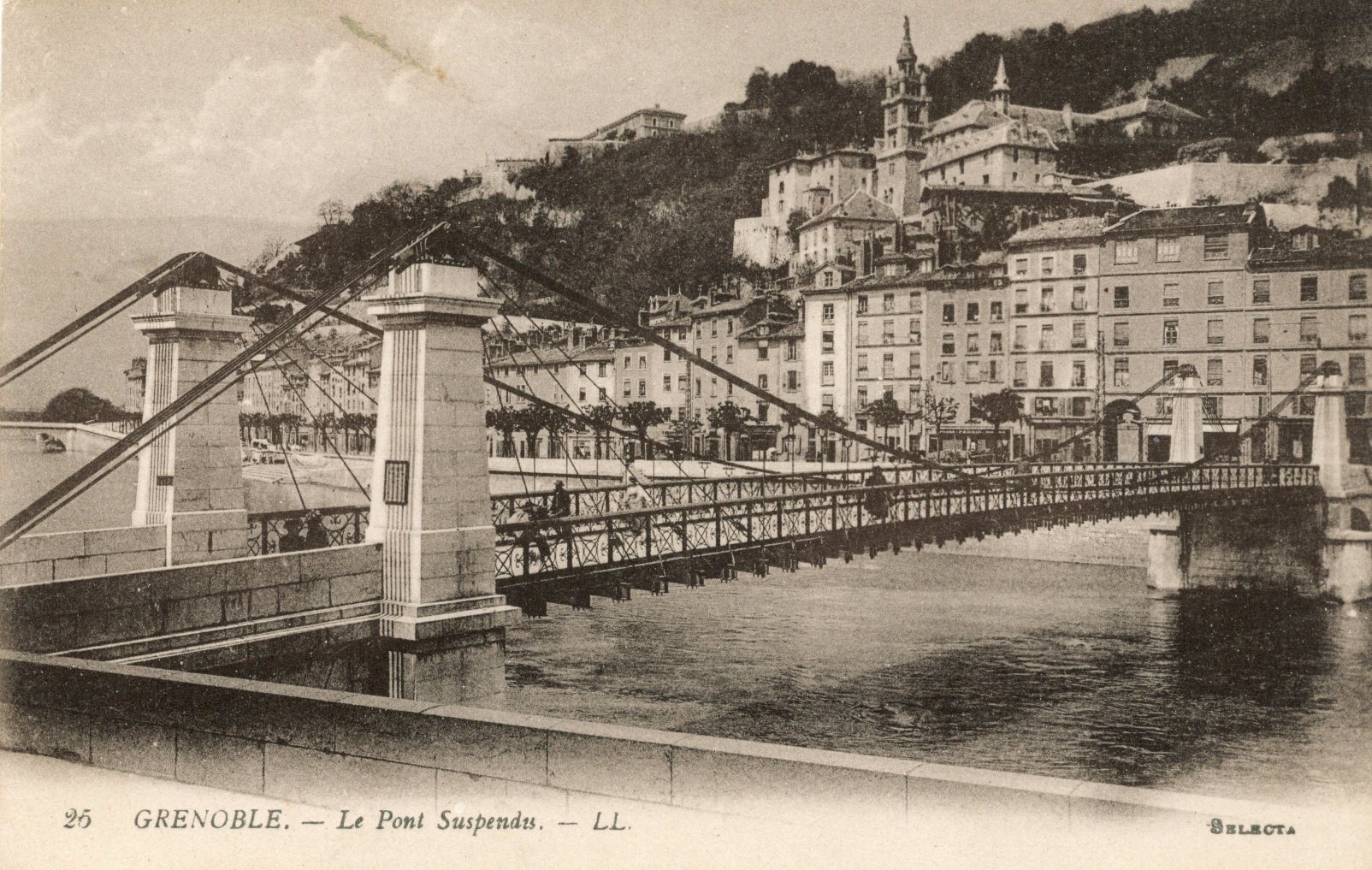
The tower and the statue of the Virgin Mary can be seen in this postcard dating from around 1916.

In 1890, the residents of Grenoble—following the example of other cities at the time—sought to construct a statue of the Virgin Mary to watch over and protect the city's inhabitants.The statue would be named Notre-Dame d’en-Haut. Alfred Berruyer, architect of the renowned La Salette Basilica, was commissioned to build a 30-metre tower topped with a 3.6-metre golden statue of the Virgin Mary, fabricated from cast-iron and weighing 1.8 tonnes. Below this monumental statue—situated at each corner of the tower—were four additional statues representing the patron saints of the city: Saint Bruno, Saint Ferjus, Saint Francis de Sales and Saint Hugh. With the addition of the tower, the chapel was reopened on 25 October 1891, in the presence of the Bishop of Grenoble, Amand-Joseph Fava. However, just a few decades later, alarming cracks began appearing on the chapel's roof as a result of the tower's staggering weight. To prevent the chapel from collapsing, it was decided in 1935 that the tower would be demolished, with the demolition eventually occurring on 18 January 1936. Unfortunately, the statues would disappear afterwards; their whereabouts are presently unknown and only the statue of Saint Francis de Sales has been rediscovered. It was found in the garden of a former private clinic on Rue Thiers .

On 19 June 1936, the chapel was listed as a historical monument.

=== Gardens & Exterior ===
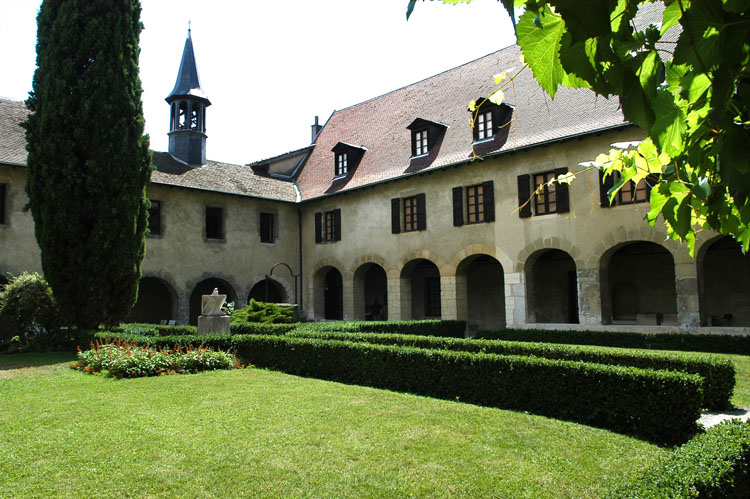
The cloister in the former convent of Saint-Marie d'en-Haut.

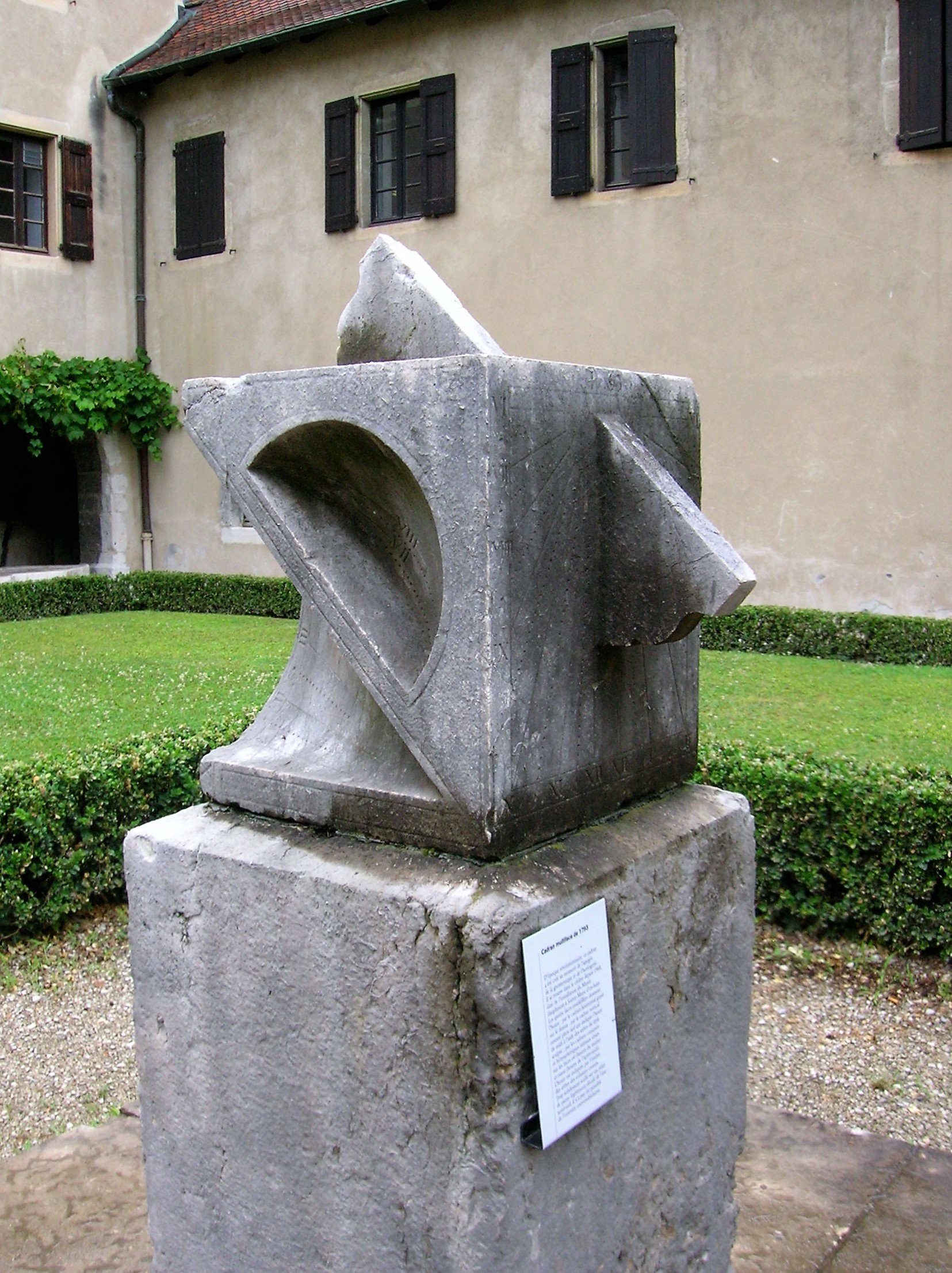
The multi-face sundial (1793) in the centre of the cloister.

The cloister garden, featuring small hedges bordering four square lawns, is typical of 17th century garden design. A multi-face sundial, dating back to 1793, was installed in the centre of the garden in 1968, when the museum moved to its current premises. A second sundial can also be found under the arcade. Eighty centimetres high and sculpted from rock during the Gallo-Roman period, this sundial represents the heavenly vault and divides the day into twelve hours. In 2013, it was temporarily transferred inside the museum for an exhibition on sundials supported by the Department of Isère. Another object is also displayed within the cloister: a stone grain measurer, originally commissioned by the audit chamber of Dauphiné for placement in the market town of Voreppe. Gravestones with epitaphs dating from the Gallo-Roman period of Cularo—the Gallic name for Grenoble—can also be found under the arcades. These gravestones belong to the first archaeological museum of Grenoble in the neighbourhood of Saint-Laurent, founded in 1853.

To the east of the museum lies a terraced garden sloping along the montée Chalemont. Originally composed of vineyards and vegetable plots, these terraces are situated 30 metres above the old city of Grenoble. On 5 July 2013, the museum unveiled a new variety of roses in honour of the historian Rose Valland, a noted member of the French Resistance.

These terraces, as well as the museum building, were listed as historical monuments on 3 November 1965.

== Museum Collections & Library Resource Centre ==
The museum's collections document the history of the inhabitants of the former province of Dauphiné and more broadly, the French Alps. These collections contain:

- more than 100,000 objects — from prehistoric flintstones to the latest generation of snowboards
- 160,000 photographes, of which 1,000 are autochromes
- 22,000 iconographic documents, including drawings, prints, posters, maps and postcards
- 1,400 films
- 2,000 audio recordings, including interviews about region-specific skills, traditions and linguistic dialects
- over 20,000 works of art, both old and new

The Musée dauphinois holds the archival collection of noted alpinist and geodesist, Paul Helbronner. This particular collection features, among other historical objects, over 15,000 glass plates. These plates, when assembled together, form a 360° panoramic photograph of the Alpine summits.

The museum's overall collection continues to grow thanks to donations, archaeological digs, and new purchases, such as Théodore Ravanat's oil painting, Chemin de la Grande Chartreuse par la vallée du Grésivaudan, on display at the museum's entrance, acquired in 2019.

Since 1998, the museum has collaborated with the publishing house Glénat to produce L'Alpe, a magazine documenting the Alpine region.

Since 2007, the museum has embarked on a digitalisation campaign. Since then, 70,000 items have been digitally documented. A selection of these bibliographic records can now be accessed through the Department of Isère's collection portal (portail des collections du Département de l'Isère).

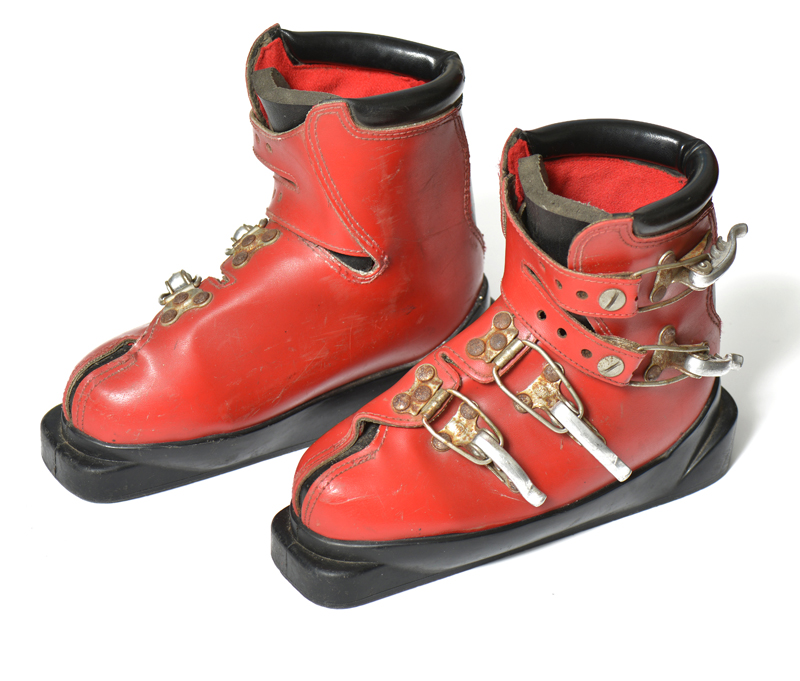
Child's ski boots, 1960s.

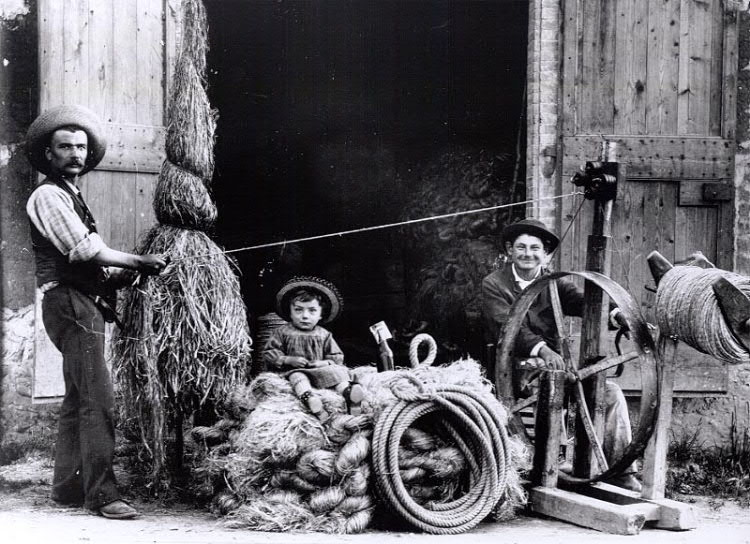
Hemp twiners, photographed by the Cristille brothers, late 19th century.

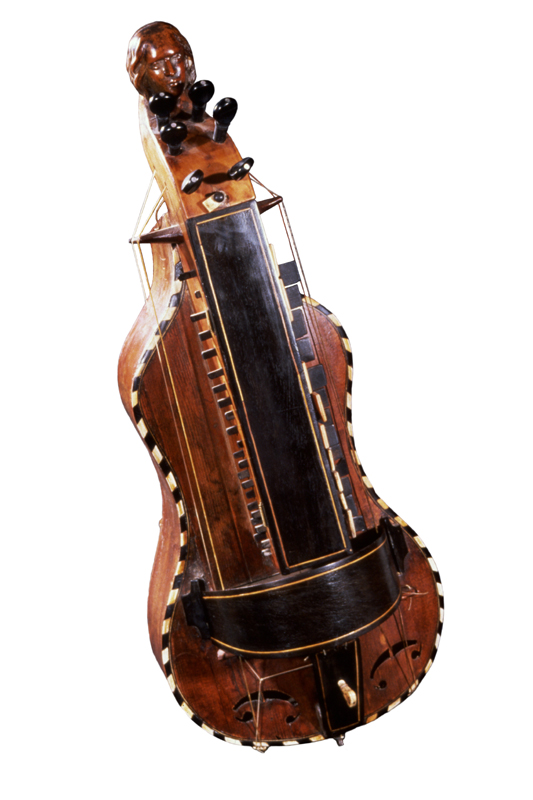
Viol, 19^{th} century.

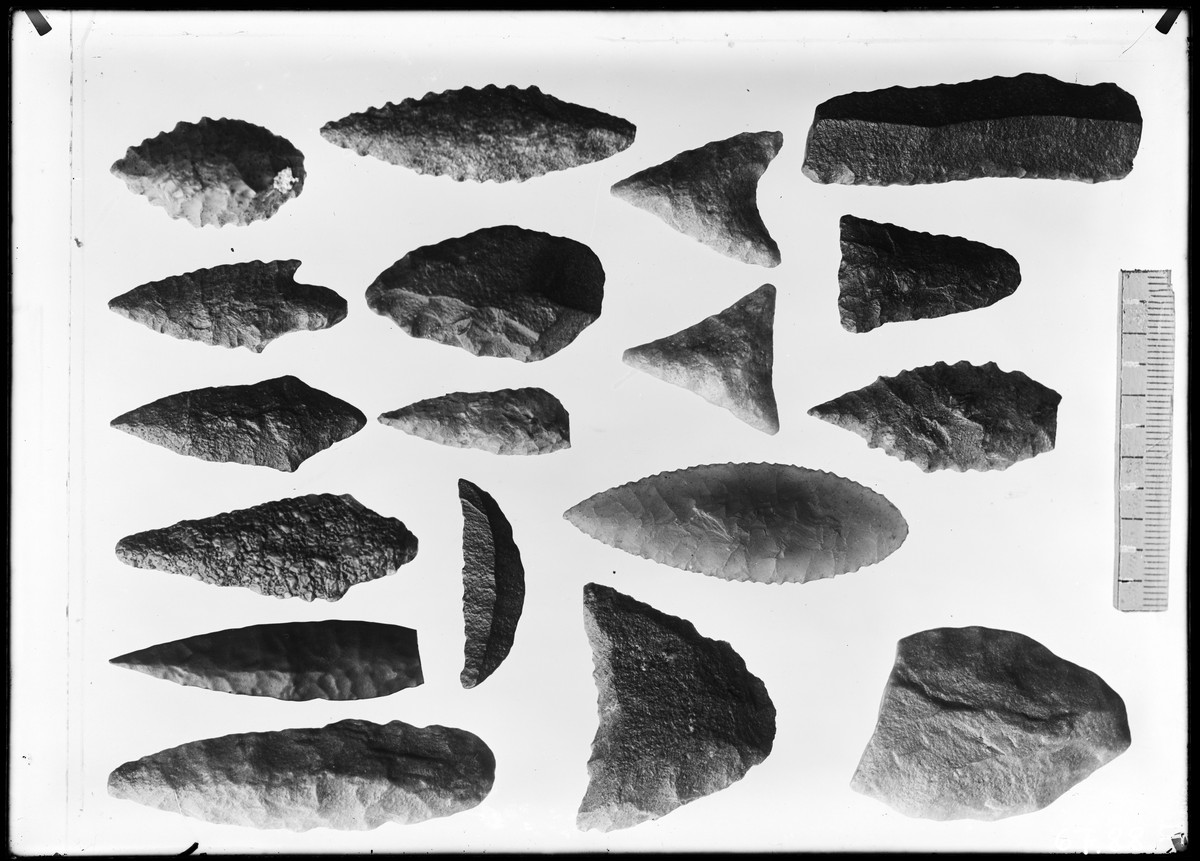
Collection of flint stones photographed by Hippolyte Müller, early 20th century.

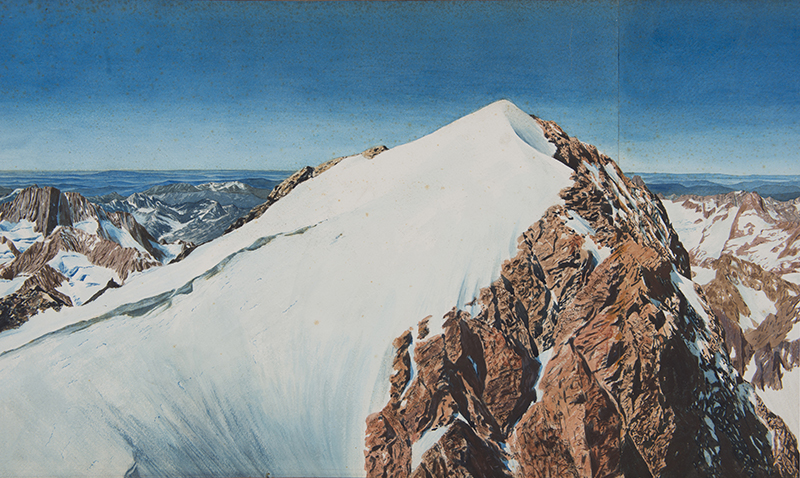
Watercolour by Paul Helbronner, circa 1900, portraying the view from the Pelvoux summit.

== Exhibitions ==
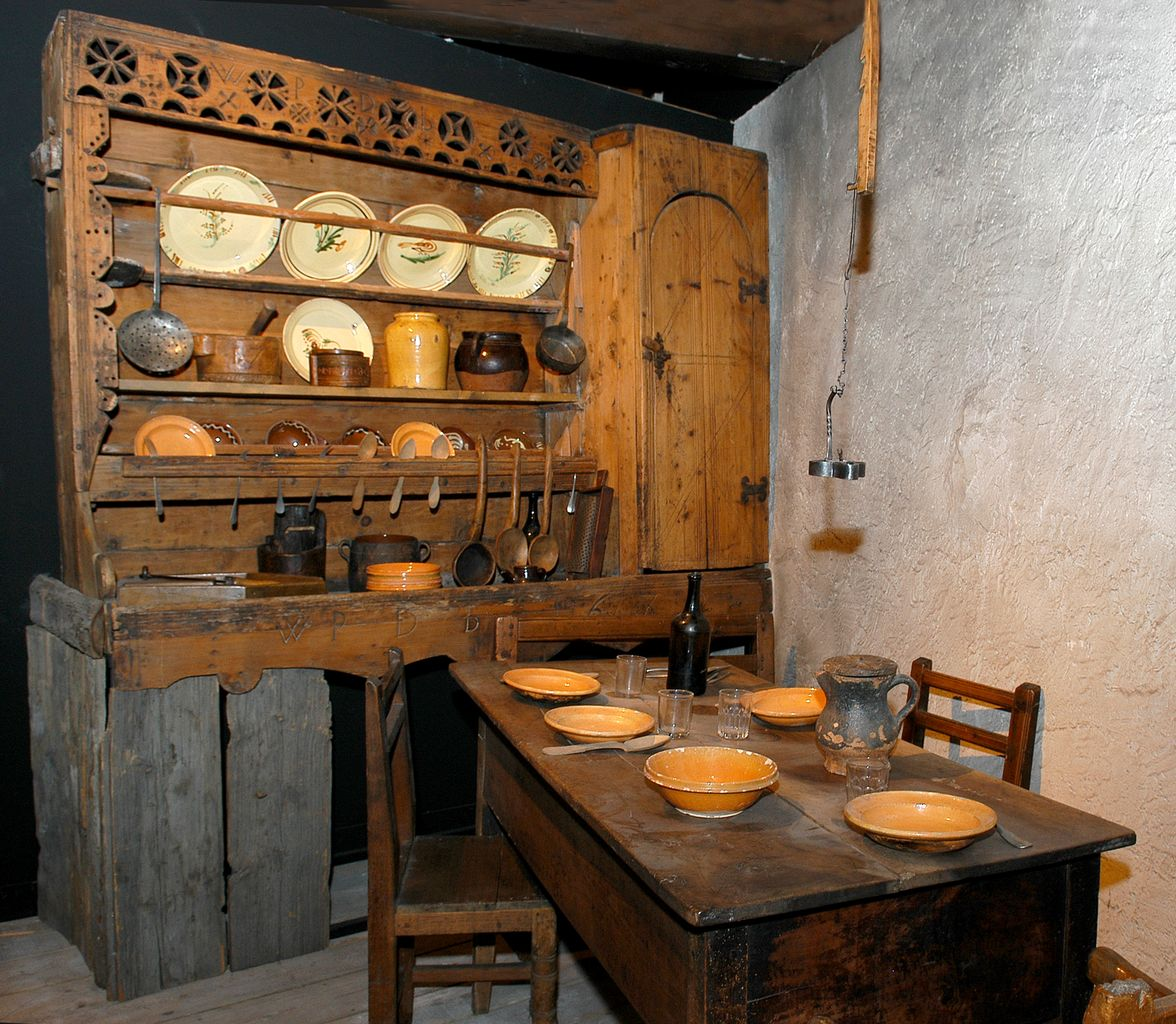
A traditional alpine kitchen. From the permanent exhibition Gens de l'alpe.

=== Overview ===
The museum is composed of five floors with the convent's former chapel and the nun's choir occupying the lower ground level. The ground floor includes a reception area, a series of temporary exhibition spaces, the cloister and the terraced gardens. The first floor also holds temporary exhibition spaces. The second floor is reserved for long-term exhibitions and the third floor is currently occupied by a permanent exhibition dedicated to the history of winter sports in the region.

The museum offers three permanent exhibitions and further organises two temporary exhibitions These exhibitions are accompanied by a series of events centred around sculpture and live performances (theatre, dance, story-telling and various concerts — baroque, classical, world, contemporary music as well as jazz — are regularly held in the Visitation Chapel), conferences and documentary screenings. Each exhibition is also the subject of a publication. A full catalogue of these publications can be found on the museum's website.

=== Permanent Exhibitions ===
Following the footsteps of Jean-Pierre Laurent, the Musée dauphinois seeks to display a variety of exhibitions encompassing many different topics. It offers three permanent exhibitions: Alpins 7000 ans d'histoires, Le réve blanc, and Sainte-Marie d'en Haut Il y a quatre siècles.

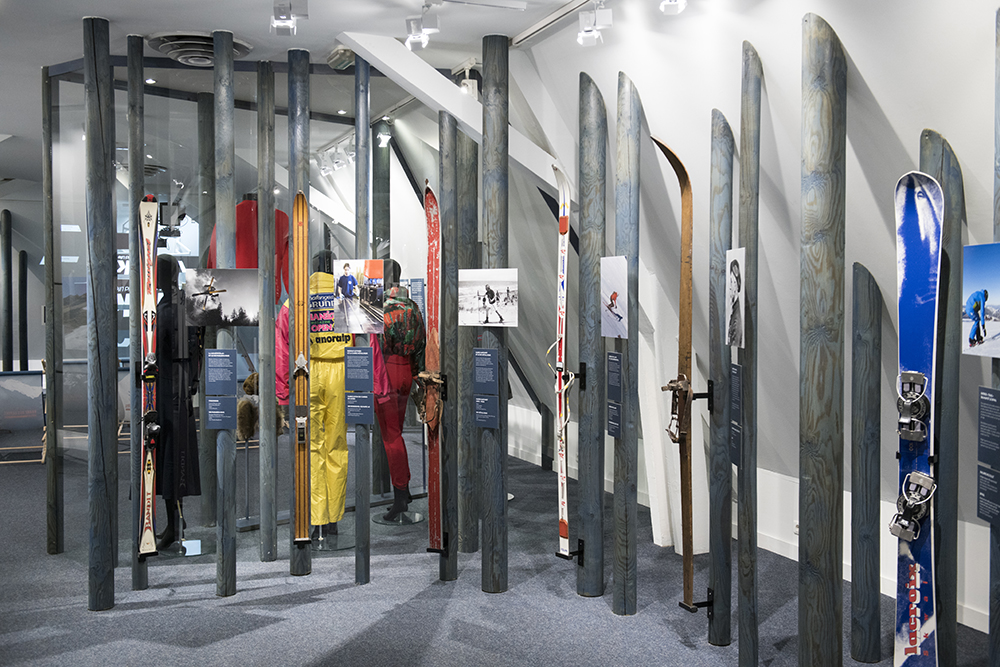
The permanent exhibition Le rêve blanc.

The museum offers three permanent exhibitions. Alpins 7000 ans d'histoires first opened in 1998 and was remodelled in 2006; it displays hundreds of ethnographic items from the daily life of people living in the mountains. Le rêve blanc replaced the previous permanent exhibition La Grande Histoire du ski in April 2018. The exhibition Sainte-Marie d'en-Haut Il y a quatre siècles explores the history of the former convent and chapel.

==== Alpins, 7000 ans d'histoire ====
Initially titled "Gens de là-haut " by Jean-Pierre Laurent and subsequently, "Gens de l'alpe " in 1998, this exhibition has been readapted under the title "Alpins, 7000 ans d'histoires " since 2023. It concerns settlement of the region since the Neolithic Era and also sheds light on daily life in the 19th and 20th centuries, including topics such as pastoralism, field labor, education, family structures, and community interactions, particularly within the religious sphere. Incorporating the latest research on the Alps as well as modern scenographic techniques, this exhibition explores how inhabitants have adapted to geographic, political, and socioeconomic challenges. Accessible to a wide audience, the exhibition promises an educational and engaging experience, integrating the designs of Flore Hénocque, as well as the Incoll'Alps trivia quiz, available in both French and English.

==== Le rêve blanc ====
The second exhibition, titled "Le rêve blanc. L'épopée des sports d'hiver dans les Alpes " reports on contemporary interactions with the Alps as well as the changes they have sparked. It simultaneously explores the history of skiing in the region but also invites reflection on the role of the mountain and its inhabitants in the face of the climate crisis. Through a series of filmed testimonies, it offers varied perspectives and possible solutions to sustain the region's sporting tradition in light of contemporary challenges. For its reopening in 2023, one of the 33 torches from the 1968 Olympic flame was integrated into the museum's collection.

Sainte-Marie d'en Haut Il y a quatre siècles

A space is consecrated to the history of the former Convent of Sainte-Marie d'en Haut in a corridor leading to the chapel.

=== Temporary Exhibitions ===
From 1990 to 2020, the museum has welcomed over 100 temporary expositions. As of late, it averages three new expositions per year. Several recurring themes can be found in these expositions.

- Archaeological heritage (regional, prehistoric, or historic): "Premiers alpins"; "Nos villages ont cinq mille ans"; "Premiers princes celtes"; "Chevaliers de l'an mil"
- Industrial Heritage: "Cathédrales électriques"; "Les Maîtres de l'acier"; "Fait main. Quand Grenoble gantait le monde"
- Intangible Heritage: "Inventer le monde, les Rhônalpins et leurs langages"; "Peurs bleues, l'enfant et les croque-mitaines"; "L'ivresse des sommets. Eaux de vie et autres breuvages des Alpes"
- Art: "Rose Valland. En quête de l'art spolié"; "Bretelles et fabulations"; "Art et science"

The museum accords particular importance to immigrant communities contributing to regional culture as well as to societal themes, testified through the following expositions and publications: "La Différence" (with the Musée d'éthnographie de Neuchâtel and the Musée de la Civilisation de Québec); "Les Millénaires de Dieu"; and "Rester libres!"

Below is a chronological list of the museum's temporary expositions:

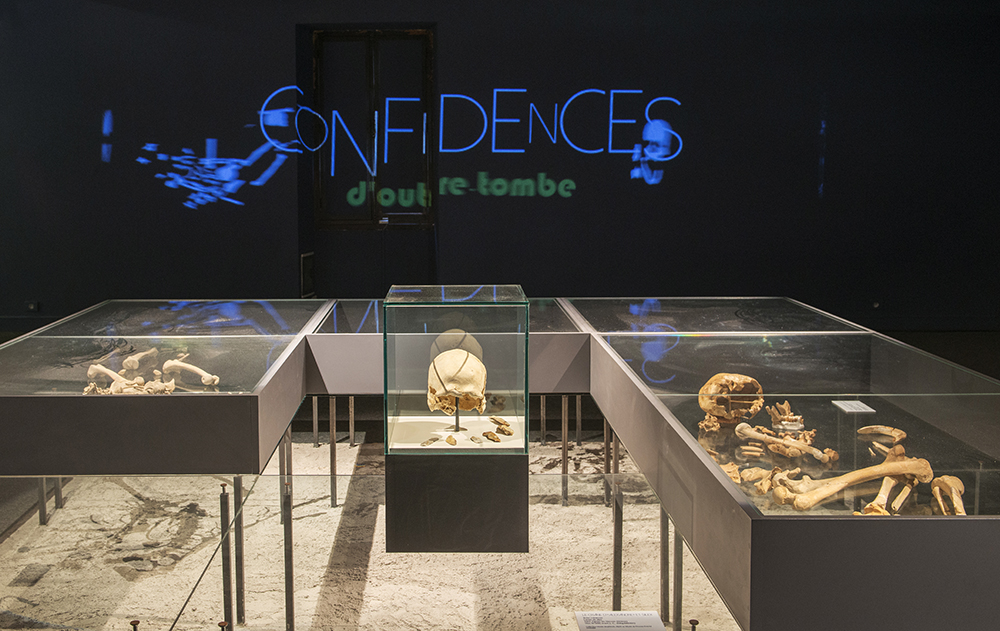
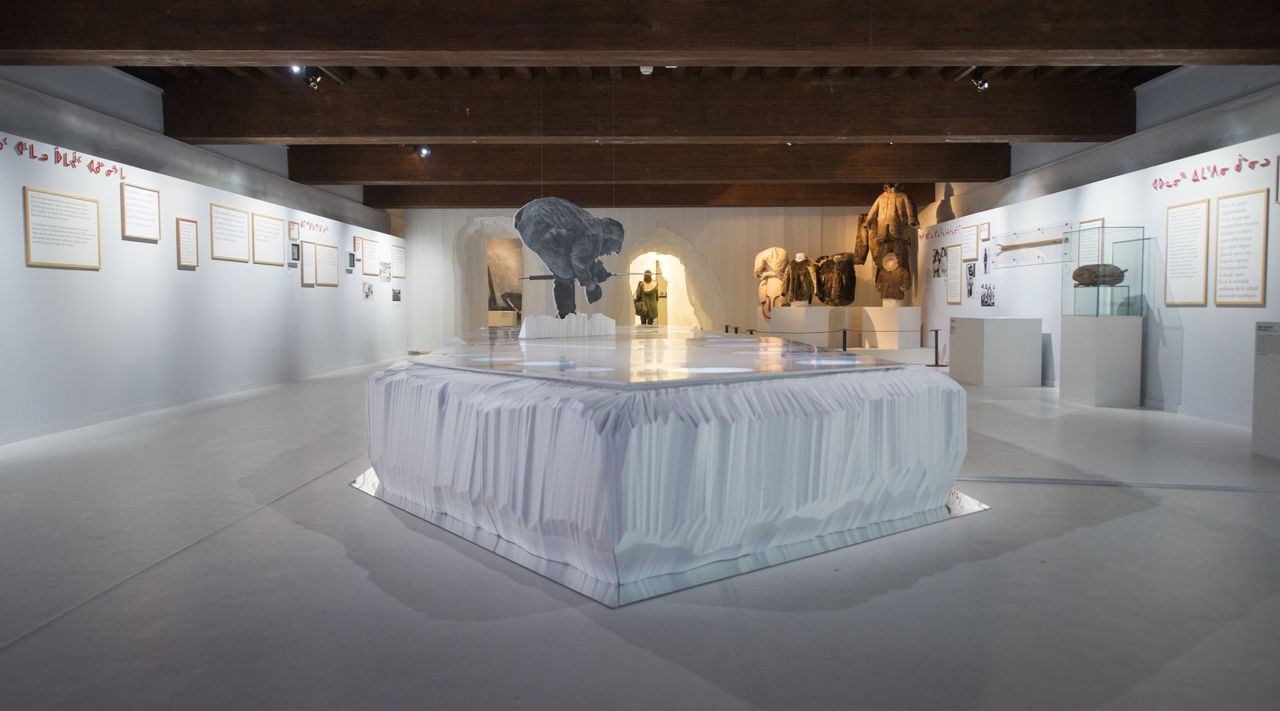
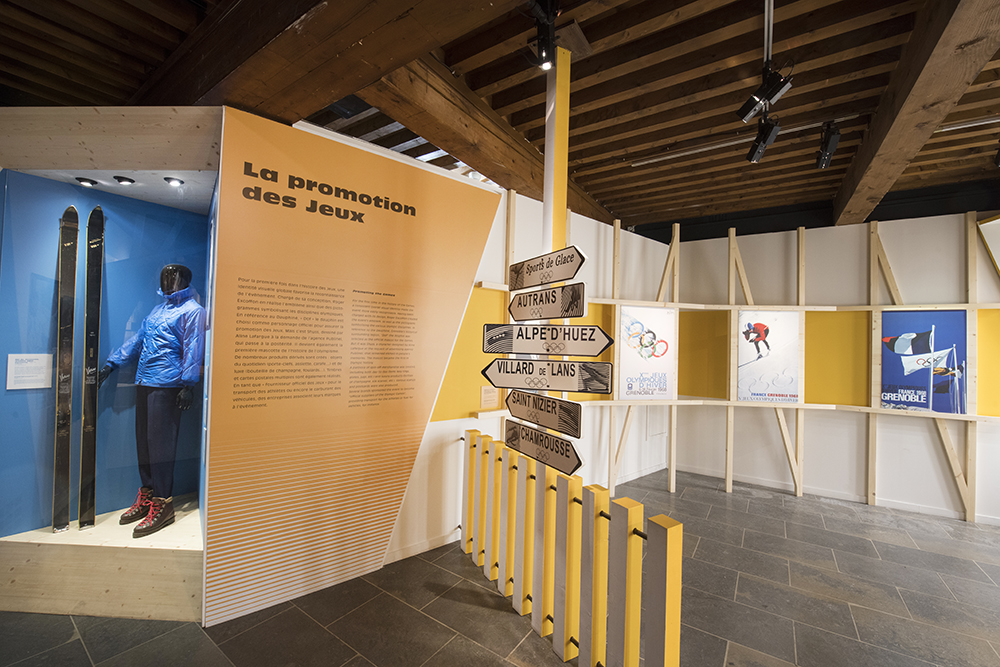
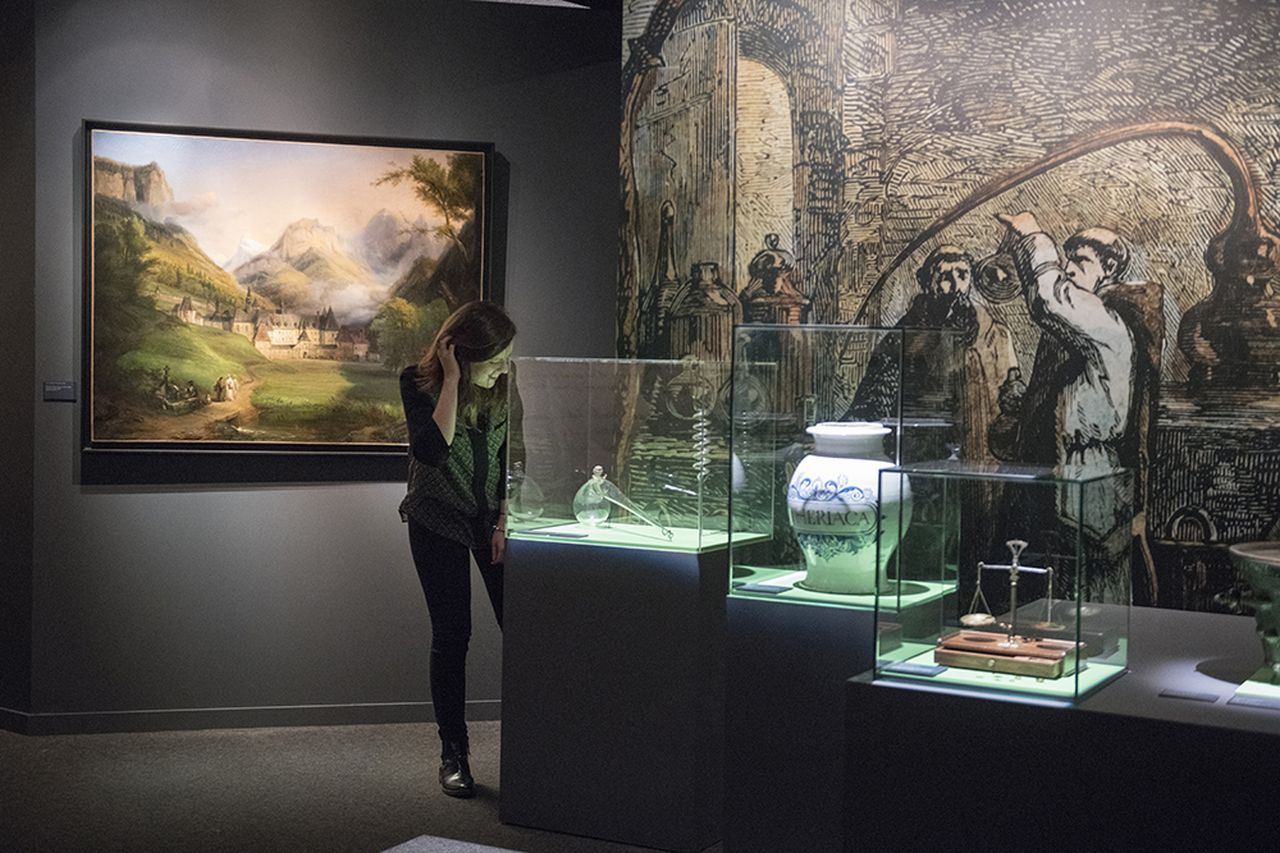
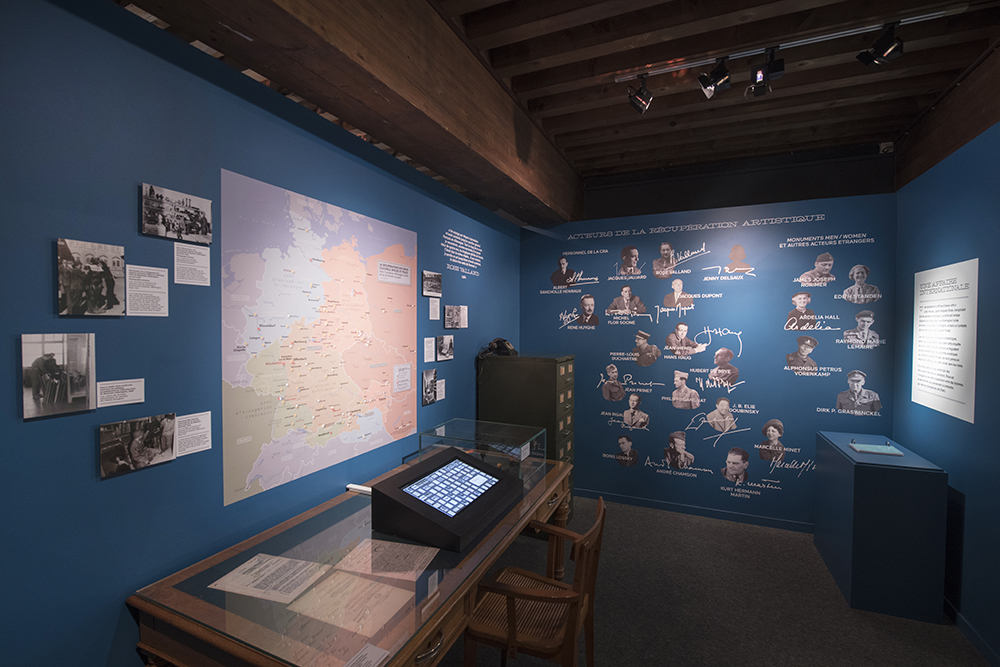
From top to bottom: Confidences d'outre-tombe,Nunavik. En terre Inuit, Grenoble 1968. Les Jeux olympiques qui ont changé l'Isère, L'ivresse des sommets. Eaux-de-vie, liqueurs et autres breuvages des Alpes, Rose Valland. En quête de l’art spolié.

==== 1963–1980 ====
- Exposition d'art religieux ancien – 1963
- À la découverte de l'art roman dauphinois – 1964
- Trésors du Musée dauphinois – 1968
- Jalons d'histoire dauphinoise – 1970 to 1982
- Vivre à Grenoble hier – 1971
- Art de Rome et de ses provinces – 1971
- Art et Architecture – 1972
- Marionnettes 73 à Grenoble – 1973
- Lumière et feu – April to July 1973
- Peintures paysannes de Dalécarlie – 1973
- Hache – Ébénistes à Grenoble – 1974
- Marques postales dauphinoises – Donation Rebreyend-Laubies – May to June 1974
- Sérigraphies – 1974
- Art populaire du Tyrol – La maison paysanne – 15 November 1975 to 15 April 1976
- Amisch quilt – 9 July to 29 August 1976
- Art esquimau contemporain – 10 November to 5 December 1976
- Poterie des fellahs d'Égypte – September 1979
- Enfants des montagnes – 1979

1980—1990:

- Les colporteurs fleuristes de l'Oisans – 1981
- 4000 ans de chaussures – 1981
- Saint-Véran, la mémoire du Queyras – 1981
- Le roman des Grenoblois – 1982
- Ex-voto napolitains (XVI^{e} – XX^{e} siècle) – 1982
- Itinéraires archéologiques à Naples et ses environs – 8 November to 5 December 1983
- Poteries et potiers de Cliousclat – 17 December 1983 to 29 February 1984
- Le désert du monde – L'ordre des Chartreux – October 1984 to October 1985
- De mémoire d'homme – 1986–1987
- La main du gantier – 26 October to the end of 1986
- Les Celtes et les Alpes – February to May 1987
- Masques – 23 May to 30 September 1987
- Regard des années 1920 et 30 – Mémoire d'architecture – Mallet Stevens – 13 November to 5 December 1987
- Sainte-Marie-d'en-Haut – 1988
- Découverte et sentiment de la montagne – 1988
- De pain et d'espérance 1788–1988 – Grenoble et le Dauphiné à la veille de la Révolution – 1988
- Profession guide, deux siècles de passion montagnard – 18 November 1988 – Summer of 1989
- Cathédrales électriques – Cent ans d'hydroélectricité en Dauphiné 19 December 1989 to 31 December 1990
- Villages de Roumanie, identités en péril – Exposition photographique – June to October 1989
- Quelle mémoire pour demain ? – 1989
- Eux et nous – 1989
- Corato-Grenoble – Grenoble – 1989

1990—2000:

- Hymne au parfum – January 1990 to February 1990
- Pays, paysans, paysages du Vercors – May 1990 to September 1990
- Inventer le monde. Les rhônalpins et leurs langages – May 1990 to November 1991
- Bijoux berbères du Maroc. Traditions juives et arabes, au creuset du monde berbère – October 1990 to March 1991
- Gaëtan Gatian de Clérambault. Psychiatre et photographe – October 1990 to December 1990
- Premiers princes celtes – November 1990 to August 1991
- Médinas et ksours. Une culture millénaire – February 1991 to March 1991
- Les champs de la ville. Grenoble et ses campagnes – May 1991 to June 1993
- Icônes roumaines sur verre. Art sacré populaire des Modèle:S2-XVIII – December 1991 to April 1992
- Présentation de l'automate « Les joueurs de cartes » – December 1991 to January 1992
- Passion bergers, cloches et sonailles. Usages et fabrication – March 1992 to June 1992
- Homo turisticus. Cent ans de tourisme ordinaire en montagne – May 1992 to December 1992
- L'homme et les alpes – October 1992 to January 1993
- Des grecs. Les grecs de Grenoble. Les costumes de la Grèce traditionnelle – March 1993 to January 1994
- Le temps des rafles – April 1993 to June 1993
- Les années noires. La répression à Grenoble durant l'occupation – April 1993 to January 1994
- Tibet en exil. Le Dalaï Lama et le bouddhisme tibétain – October 1993 to January 1994
- Potiers en Isère. XIX^{e}-XX^{e} siècles – October 1993
- Chevaliers paysans de l'an mil au lac de Paladru – October 1993 to May 1996
- Le cinéma à cent ans! Cent ans de cinéma en Isère – April 1994 to October 1994
- Le balcon de Belledonne. Photographies de Francis Helgorsky – June 1994 to January 1995
- Patrimoine en Isère. Pays de Vizille – October 1994 to December 1994
- Hommage aux paysans de montagne. Photographies de Jean-Pierre Bonfort – April 1995 to September 1995
- Nos villages ont cinq mille ans – June 1995 to October 1995
- Premiers alpins. Des derniers chasseurs de la préhistoire aux premiers paysans – September 1995 – January 1997
- Patrimoine en Isère. Pays de Domène – December 1995 to January 1996
- L'image de l'autre dans la photographie. L'immigration en France vue par 45 photographes – February 1996 to April 1996
- La différence. Trois musées. Trois regards – February 1996 to October 1996
- Les maîtres de l'acier. Histoire du fer dans les alpes – October 1996 to December 1998
- Patrimoine en Trièves – February 1997 to May 1997
- D'Isère et d'Arménie. Histoire d'une communauté – April 1997 to June 1999
- Épreuves d'Arménie. Photographies de Guy Martin-Rave – April 1997 to June 1999
- Hache. Ébénistes à Grenoble – October 1997 to March 1999
- Entre l'eau et la lumière. Les hommes de l'hydraulique. Une création photographique de Anne-Marie Louvet – December 1997 to April 1998
- Les alpes à l'affiche – November 1998 to January 1999
- Corps de classe. Une création photographique de Catherine Poncin – March 1999 to October 1999
- Patrimoine en Chambaran – December 1999 to March 2000

2000—2010:

- Racines. Ghada Amer, Brahim Bachiri, Samta Benyahia, Mohamed El baz, Mona Hatoum, Shirin Neshat, artistes plasticiens – June to December 2000
- Pour que la vie continue – D'Isère et du Maghreb, mémoires d'immigrés – October 1999 to December 2000
- Peurs bleues. L'enfant et les croquemitaines – April 2000 to April 2001
- Les millénaires de Dieu. Une vielle histoire pleine d'avenir – November 2000 to December 2001
- Patrimoine en Oisans – October 2001 to December 2001
- Potiers et faïenciers en Dauphiné – October 2001 to January 2003
- Les géographes inventent les Alpes. Deux siècles de géographie alpine – December 2001 to January 2003
- Martinotto frères. Photographes à Grenoble – June 2002 to January 2003
- Les Alobroges. Gaulois et Romains du Rhône aux Alpes – October 2002 to September 2003
- Art post'alpe. La correspondance de 200 artistes postaux autour du bestiaire alpin – January to March 2003
- Transhumance. Été 1951. Sur la route des alpages – March to July 2003
- Français d'Isère et d'Algérie – May 2003 to September 2004
- Un air de famille. Berriat à Grenoble, Tevézáros à Budapest. Deux quartiers de villes en changement – October 2003 to March 2004
- Patrimoine en Isère / Pays de Roussillon – December 2003 to June 2004
- Hippolyte Müller. Aux origines de la préhistoire alpine – May 2004 to May 2006
- Trésors d'Égypte. La « Cachette » de Karnak – September 2004 to January 2005, exposition-hommage à Georges Legrain à l'occasion du IX^{e} congrès international d'égyptologie.
- Germaine Tillion. Itinéraire et engagements d'une ethnologue – February to May 2005
- Louis Mandrin. Malfaiteur ou bandit au grand cœur ? – May 2005 to March 2006
- Papetiers des alpes. Six siècles d'histoire. – October 2005 to July 2007
- Le monde n'est pas un panorama – April to June 2006
- Le Musée dauphinois a cent ans ! – October 2006 to June 2008
- Êtres fantastiques. De l'imaginaire alpin à l'imaginaire humain – October 2006 to June 2008
- Rester Libres ! Les expressions de liberté. Des allobroges à nos jours – June to September 2007
- Contez les boutons – Installation – Événement – June to September 2007
- Eugénie Goldstern 1884–1942. Être ethnologue juive dans l’Europe alpine des deux guerres – November 2007 to June 2008
- Premiers bergers des Alpes. De la préhistoire à l'Antiquité – April 2008 to June 2009
- Être ouvrier en Isère. XVIII^{e} – XXI^{e} siècle – October 2008 to January 2010
- Rompre le silence. Mémoires de chômeurs et précaires en Isère. 1975–2008 – November 2008 to January 2009
- Habiter – April 2009 to June 2010
- Tibétains. Peuple du monde – October 2009 to January 2011

2010—2020:

- Matrice, exposition de la plasticienne Marie Goussé – May to September 2010
- Vaucanson et l’homme artificiel. Des automates aux robots – April 2010 to June 2011
- Sur les bords de la rivière Sangha – February 2011
- Les anneaux de la mémoire – April 2011
- Désert en fête Sylvie Chappaz, photographe – June – August 2011
- Ce que nous devons à l'Afrique – October 2010 to January 2012
- Hannibal et les Alpes. Une traversée, un mythe – April 2011 to July 2012
- Un air d'Italie. La présence des Italiens en Isère – November 2011 to January 2013
- Cœur d'ouvriers. Un travail photographique de Bernard Ciancia – December 2011 to September 2012
- Voyage dans ma tête. La collection d'Antoine de Galbert – March to July 2012
- L'Isère en relief. Les maquettes monumentales des fortifications de Grenoble et de Fort Barraux – October 2012 to January 2013
- Chambre noire pour amateurs éclairés. Collection photographique Flandrin – November 2012 to September 2013
- Angèle, Suzanne, Martine et moi... – September 2013 to January 2014
- Bretelles et fabulations – February to June 2014
- Les dessous de l'Isère. Une histoire de la lingerie féminine – March 2013 to September 2014
- Caractères d'altitude. Portraits sonores et photographiques des Écrins – co-production avec le Parc national des Écrins et le Centre de l'oralité alpine – Conseil général des Hautes-Alpes – October 2013 to May 2014
- Voir midi à sa porte. Cadrans solaires de l'Isère – December 2013 to January 2015
- À l'arrière comme au front. Les Isérois dans la Grande Guerre – March 2014 to June 2015
- [K]rânes42. La catacombe artistique – December 2014 to December 2015
- Confidences d'outre-tombe. Squelettes en question – December 2014 to January 2016
- Premières couleurs. La photographie autochrome – May to September 2015
- Grenoble 1925, La grande mutation – December 2015 to September 2016
- Tsiganes. La vie de bohème ? Six siècles de présence en Isère – October 2015 to January 2017
- Nunavik. En terre Inuit – March 2016 to January 2017
- Portrait large. Paysages sensibles du Pays voironnais. Photographes de Thierry Bazin – October 2016 to February 2017
- Life. Affiches de Kazumasa Nagai – November 2016 to January 2017
- Si on chantait! La La La La ... – December 2016 to January 2018
- Alpes là! – March to October 2017
- Lesdiguières, le prince oublié – October 2017 to July 2018
- Pop en France. Portraits d'artistes 1967–2017 – November 2017 to June 2018
- Grenoble 1968. Les Jeux olympiques qui ont changé l'Isère – February 2018 to October 2019
- Des samouraïs au kawaii. Histoire croisée du Japon et de l’Occident – October 2018 to June 2019
- L'ivresse des sommets. Eaux-de-vie, liqueurs et autres breuvages des Alpes – March 2019 to November 2020
- Enclosed, Tony Manent – June to December 2019
- Rose Valland. En quête de l'art spolié – November 2019 – June 2020

2020—present:

- Refuges alpins. De l'abri de fortune au tourisme d'altitude – June 2020 to June 2021
- Résidences photographiques/ Kédougou [Sénégal] 2020–2021 – May 2021 to December 2021
- Un amour de vélo – May 2021 to July 2022
- L'Homme et la forêt en Isère. Enjeux d'hier et d'aujourd'hui – September 2021 to Janvier 2022
- Art et science – November 2021 to November 2022
- Fait main. Quand Grenoble gantait le monde – March 2022 to March 2023
- Égyptomania – November 2022 to November 2023
- Style & cimes, photographies de Jacques Henri Lartigue – April 2024 to January 2025d

== Publications ==
=== Le Monde alpin et rhodanien ===
A regional journal on ethnology, Le Monde alpin et rhodanien published two to four issues per year from 1973 to 2006. It featured studies and articles on Southeastern France, especially on important geographical landmarks such as the Alps, the Rhône, the historical Lyonnais province, the Po Valley, Lake Geneva, and the Camargue region. Founded in 1973 by Charles Joisten, the journal was edited by le Centre alpin et rhodanien d'ethnologie (CARE), an association closely affiliated with the Musée dauphinois. CARE published a collection of works titled Documents d'ethnologie régionale. Remembrance and cultural heritage are among the central themes in interactions with the communities of the region—whether rural, urban, historical, or contemporary. The journal also examines the beliefs, rites, customs, language, oral traditions, and music of the region. Ethnologists, historians, and linguists work closely with the editorial team. However, particular importance is placed on firsthand accounts, including from "self-taught" experts on the region's history and culture. These accounts offer fresh and irreplaceable perspectives on "lived" experiences, shedding light on aspects of "traditional" life. For the Musée dauphinois, this journal was a key tool for disseminating scientific information about local communities and their heritage.

=== L'Alpe ===
Proposed by André Pitte in the 1990s and born from the friendship he shared with publisher Jacques Glénat and Jean Guibal, then director of the Musée dauphinois, the journal L'Alpe has been published quarterly since 1998. It concerns "those men who from Provence to Austria, from the Swiss Alps to Slovenia, have adapted to an exceptional environment and have taken advantage of the mountain, writing history composed of exchanges, migrations, and opportunities." While founded on rigorous research, L'Alpe is not a scholarly journal. Leveraging the fields of history, geography, archaeology, ethnology, and literature, it seeks to connect with a broad audience in search of cultural connection, utilizing the museum's network and resources. In return, L'Alpe documents the Euro-Alpine influence on the museum.

=== Les Patrimoines ===
Published by the regional newspaper Le Dauphiné libéré (circulated throughout the French Alps but also in Drôme, Ardèche, and to the north of Isère), Les Patrimoines is a collection seeking to promote regional heritage. It highlights popular cultural sites, regional cities, famous historical figures, and local products. These publications are concise, totaling fifty pages, but highly informative, as they are compiled by specialists. The collection's wide success can be further attributed to its readability, accessibility, and the quality of the iconography in these smaller books. Over a hundred works have been published since 1998 and over a million copies have been sold. The collection's distribution perfectly compliments the mission of an institution such as the Musée dauphinois, dedicated to preserving and celebrating regional heritage and history.

== Visitors ==
Number of Annual Visitors to the Musée dauphinois
Year	2000	2001	2002	2003	2004	2005	2006	2007	2008	2009	2010	2011
Number of Visitors	49,432	50,267	49,580	41,698	107,398	523,44	53,516	48,313	45,164	57,205	65,826	62,304

Year	2012	2013	2014	2015	2016	2017	2018	2019	2020	2021	2022
Number of Visitors	92,997	67,629	61,002	63,752	74,514	59,895	84,194	77,097	30,488	28,915	67,071

== Curators ==
Directors and Curators	Year
Hippolyte Müller	1906–1933
Joseph Collomb	1933–1952
Victor Piraud	1952–1955
Joseph Laforges	1955–1966
Marcel Boulin	1966–1969
Michel Colardelle	1969–1970
Marcel Maget	1970
Jean-Pierre Laurent	1971–1986
Jean Guibal	1986–2000
Jean-Claude Duclos	2000–2011
Jean Guibal	2011–2016
Olivier Cogne	2016 –
Curators of Collections and Expositions	
Charles Joisten	1970–1981
Annie Bosso	1978–1994
Michel Hue	1992
Chantal Spillemaecker	1982–2017
Jean-Pascal Jospin	1983–2020
Isabelle Lazier	1985–2005
Franck Philippeaux	1999 –
Valérie Huss	2000–2015

== Directions ==
- By public transport: Bus route 40.
- By car: Rue Maurice-Gignoux leads from the quai Perrière and ascends the Bastille hill to the museum. It is worth mentioning that this road is the only naturally sloping road in the city.
- By foot: Climb the steps of the Montée Chalemont, starting at Place de la Cymaise opposite the Saint-Laurent bridge in the neighbourhood of Saint-Laurent.

== Bibliography ==
- Duclos Jean-Claude, Cent ans, Ed. Musée dauphinois, Département de l'Isère, Grenoble, 2006 ISBN 2-905375-89-2
- Huss Valérie (dir.), Martinotto Frères, photographes à Grenoble [exposition]. Ed. Conseil général de l'Isère – Musée dauphinois, 2002, 120 p.
- Huss Valérie (dir.), Louis Mandrin, malfaiteur ou bandit au grand cœur ? [exposition]. Ed. Conseil général de l'Isère – Musée dauphinois, 2005, 144 p.
- Huss Valérie, Blumenfeld-Chiodo Zoé (dir.), Chambre noire pour amateurs éclairés. Photographies de la collection Flandrin [exposition]. Ed. Conseil général de l'Isère – Musée dauphinois, 2012, 104 p.
- Huss Valérie (dir.), Premières couleurs. La photographie autochrome. Ed. Département de l'Isère – Musée dauphinois, 2015, 120 p.
- Laurent Jean-Pierre – Entretiens avec Mireille Gansel, ...Et l'Homme se retrouve, Cheminements Muséographiques, Ed. Département de l'Isère – Coll. Musée dauphinois, 2008 ISBN 978-2-35567-020-6
- Jospin Jean-Pascal (dir.), Hippolyte Müller, Aux origines de la Préhistoire alpine, Ed. Département de l'Isère – Musée dauphinois, 2004 ISBN 2-905375-61-2
- Spillemaecker Chantal, Sainte-Marie d’en-Haut à Grenoble. Quatre siècles d’histoire. Ed. Département de l'Isère – Musée dauphinois, 2010 ISBN 978-2-35567-041-1
