= Hache =

Hache may refer to:

- Hache (Ochtum), a river of Lower Saxony, Germany, headstream of the Ochtum
- French destroyer Hache, a destroyer built for the French Navy in the first decade of the 20th century
- Hache (TV series), a 2019 Spanish television series

== People with the surname ==
- Alain Haché (born 1970), experimental physicist and professor at the University of Moncton, Canada
- Cloé Hache (born 1997), French swimmer
- Emma Haché (born 1979), Canadian writer of Acadian descent
- Eva Hache (born 1972), Spanish comedian, actress and television show hostess
- Gérard Haché (1925–2017), Canadian politician
- Jean-François Hache (1730-1796), French ébéniste
- Thomas Hache (1664-1747), French ébéniste

== See also ==
- Hacha (disambiguation)
- Martín (hache), a 1997 Spanish and Argentine film
