= Hippolyte Müller =

French ethnographer and museum curator (1865 – 1933)

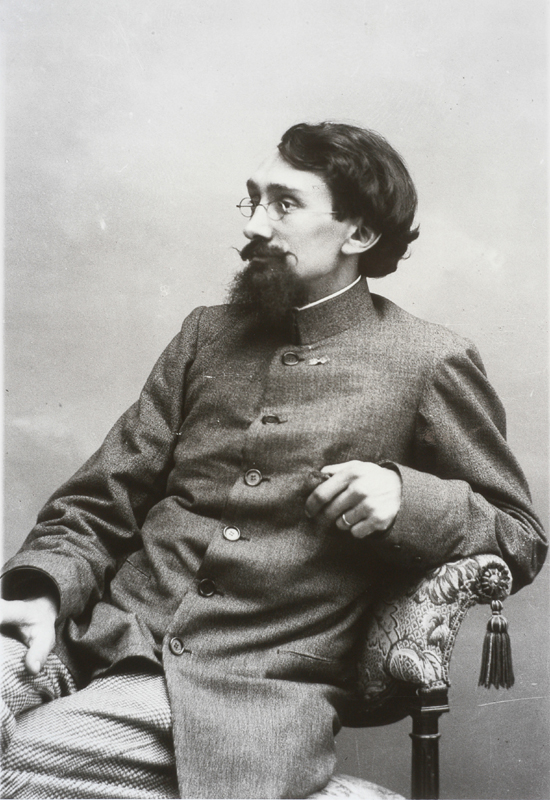
- Hippolyte Müller, circa 1900
- Born: 22 November 1865; Gap
- Died: 23 September 1933 (aged 67); Grenoble
- Occupations: Ethnographer, archaeologist, prehistorian, museum curator and teacher

Hippolyte Müller (22 November 1865 – 23 September 1933) was a French ethnographer and the first curator of the Musée dauphinois (Dauphinois Museum) in Grenoble.

A jeweller by trade, Müller was fascinated by the prehistoric era. As a self-taught archaeologist and prehistorian, he was renowned by his peers and taught classes at the Faculty of Arts in Grenoble.

== Biography ==
=== Childhood ===
Müller was born in Gap, Hautes-Alpes in 1865. His father, Jean-Étienne-Gustave Müller, originally from Alsace, was a music teacher and, during his retirement, deputy head of the Military band. His mother, Françoise Riban, who had been born and raised in Grenoble, was a housemaid. However, she died when Müller was still very young.

=== Education and first jobs ===
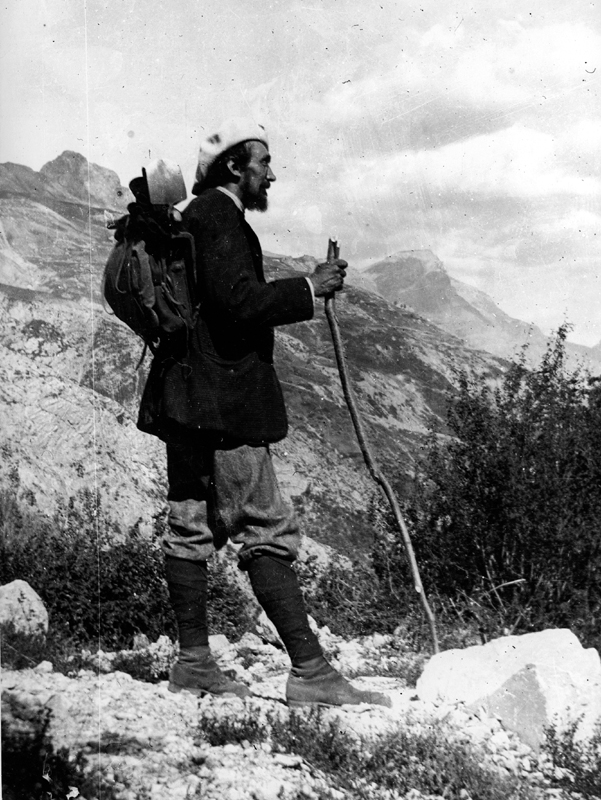
Hippolyte Müller on an expedition

The Müller family moved to Grenoble in 1869. Although Hippolyte Müller was a very talented student, his poor health, among other things, prevented him from continuing his education. In 1879, he became an apprentice jeweller in Grenoble, and qualified two years later. During these years, he spent his free time reading about subjects that interested him — the prehistoric period, numismatics and geology — and collecting coins, minerals and stamps. He also went to evening classes. He enjoyed exploring the surrounding mountains, where he often carried out archaeological digs. At 17 years old, he discovered, and then methodologically listed, the Neolithic site of Balmes de Fontaine in the Vercors mountain range. In March 1884, he went to work as a jeweller in Chambery. There, the Musée savoisien (Savoy Museum) allowed him to look at the prehistoric remains of houses built on stilts at the Bourget Lake.

In March 1885, Müller took a temporary post at the Musée d'histoire naturelle de Grenoble (The Natural History Museum of Grenoble). During this time, the Association française pour l'avancement des sciences (French Association for the Advancement of Science) held a conference in Grenoble, where Müller met many renowned intellectuals, including Ernest Chantre, the father of physical anthropology. Müller stayed in contact with Chantre and went on archaeological digs with him. Müller attended many lectures at the conference, in particular those related to the prehistoric period, given by various distinguished speakers — Gabriel de Mortillet, de Nadaillac, Émile Cartailhac and Philippe Salmon. After this introduction to the academic world, Müller decided that he wanted work in museums. Over the following years, he spent time in Avignon, Marseille and then Algeria. In 1888, he decided to return to Grenoble.

In 1891, Müller went to work in an optician’s workshop in Grenoble. There, he discovered photography, which soon became another one of his passions. Müller was then able to take thousands of pictures of his digs and discoveries. A large number of these photographs are held in the Musée dauphinois.

=== A pioneering curator, prehistorian and ethnographer ===
In February 1894, at the request of Arthur Bordier (1841-1910) — a doctor, anthropologist and head of the Medical School — Müller became a member of the Société Dauphinoise d'Ethnologie et d'Anthropologie (Dauphinois Society of Ethnology and Anthropology). He regularly published articles about his archaeological investigations on the prehistoric period in the society’s newsletter. Müller also started working as a librarian at the Medical School. During his time at the library, he became a prehistorian, archaeologist, lecturer and presenter, renowned for his scholarship, talent and generosity. His research was interdisciplinary. From 1904, he began to talk about the importance of ethnography — emphasising the use of the word ethnography instead of folklore — in particular, that of the alpine region. Instead of offering vague and far-fetched theories, Müller wanted his research to be precise and accurate. He also underlined the importance of referring to “the idea that created the object”, as well as the chronology.

=== The creation of the Musée dauphinois (Ethnographic Museum) ===
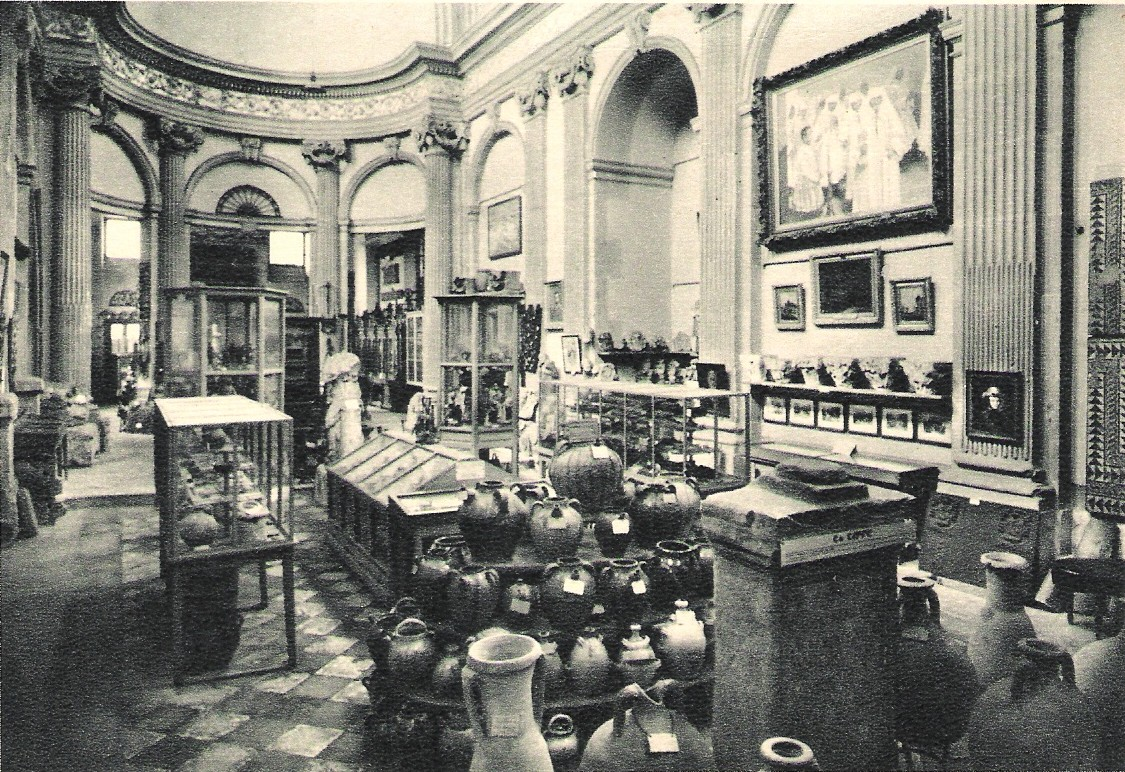
An exhibition room in the chapel of Sainte-Marie d’en-Bas, former site of the Musée dauphinois

In August 1904, during another conference organised by the Association française pour l'avancement des sciences in Grenoble, Müller put on an exhibition at the Medical School, bringing together archaeological finds from more than 50 collectors. He also added what he called "the beginnings of an alpine ethnographic museum […] including objects made from wood, iron and copper, gathered from our mountains and so the collection, however incomplete it may be, will allow us to establish a future local museum, that would serve as a great lesson on the art, traditions and customs of our mountain-dwelling ancestors". That same year, and with the agreement of the Town Council of Grenoble, he started to assemble his collection in the chapel of Sainte-Marie d'en-Bas. With his collection of objects relating to mountain life, which were slowly disappearing as a result of industrialisation, as well as donations, Müller began preparations to open an ethnographic museum in Grenoble. He carefully studied these items, their date and typology. He also talked about his work at meetings, conferences and congresses and published various articles.

On 14 December 1906, the advisory commission charged with the creation of an ethnographic museum in Grenoble, elected Müller as its first curator. In December 1918, he was admitted into the Académie Delphinale. He collaborated many times with the Ardechois archaeologist Jos Jullien de Joyeuse.

=== The creation of the Musée de l'économie domestique alpine du Lautaret ===
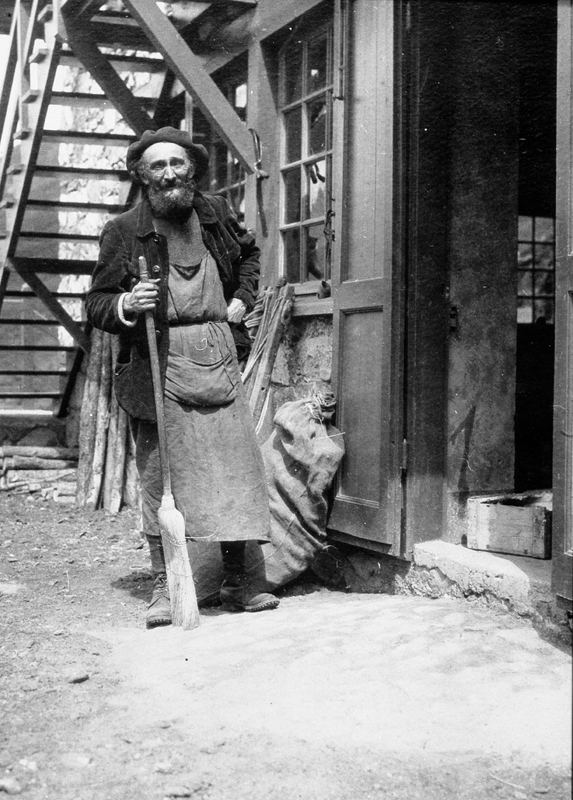
Hippolyte Müller outside the Musée du col du Lautaret

In 1919, Müller created the Musée de l’économie domestique alpine du Lautaret as part of the Alpine Botanical Gardens of Lautaret, situated at 2,100 metres in the Col de Lautaret (Hautes-Alpes). Located along the Route des Grandes Alpes, the Col de Lautaret was renowned for its alpine tourism, and the museum was partly funded by the Touring Club de France. The museum presented reconstructions of alpine interiors filled with everyday objects from the region. Despite its success, the museum closed shortly after Müller’s death.

=== The International Exhibition of Hydropower and Tourism ===
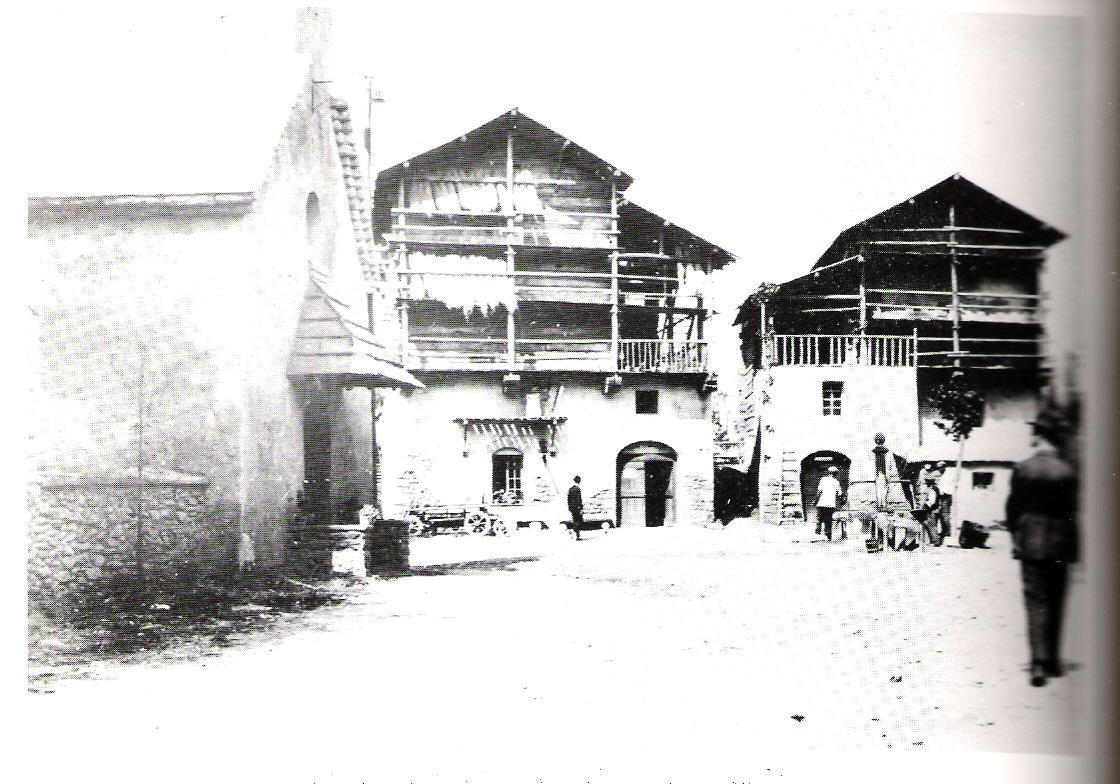
The Alpine Village at the International Exhibition of Hydropower and Tourism in 1925

The International Exhibition of Hydropower and Tourism took place in Grenoble in 1925. As part of the Alpine Village exhibition, Müller helped to build a life-sized replica of the church and two houses from the village of Saint-Véran in the Hautes-Alpes. Müller also sourced traditional alpine furniture from the region to decorate the interiors.

=== University career ===
As an expert in the field of alpine archaeology, Müller taught classes at the Faculté des Lettres de Grenoble (Grenoble Faculty of Arts) from 1921-1932. This highly respected post was recognition of his work on the first occupants of the Alps.

=== Death and posterity ===
Müller died on 23 September 1933 and was buried in the old cemetery of La Tronche, near Grenoble. At the time of his death, the Musée dauphinois held 20,000 objects in its collections.

Throughout his lifetime, Hippolyte Müller helped to develop the discipline of experimental archaeology, rediscovering methods used by prehistoric tribes. With scientific rigour, he described and practised techniques used to sharpen flint stones, make stone axes, work with wood and bones and carry out medical procedures and rituals, such as trepanning and dental mutilation. Among his archives, Müller left an un-finished novel in which a ship-wrecked sailor experimented, like Müller, with prehistoric techniques in order to survive.

Müller’s research, despite being related to the Dauphiné, was not bound by borders, and therefore is not restricted to the region.
