= Hacha =

Hacha may refer to:

- Emil Hácha (1872–1945), the third President of Czechoslovakia from 1938 to 1939
- Hacha (corporation), a Chinese electronics manufacturer mostly involved with portable media player (PMP) design and manufacture
- the Spanish name for Kyphosus elegans, a marine fish
- Portable stone court markers usually depicting animals or skulls placed around the arena of a Maya Ballgame
- Hacha'a, a poetry, music, and dance form originally from northern Iraq

== See also ==
- Hache (disambiguation)
