= Ferjus of Grenoble =

7th Century Bishop of Gratianopolis

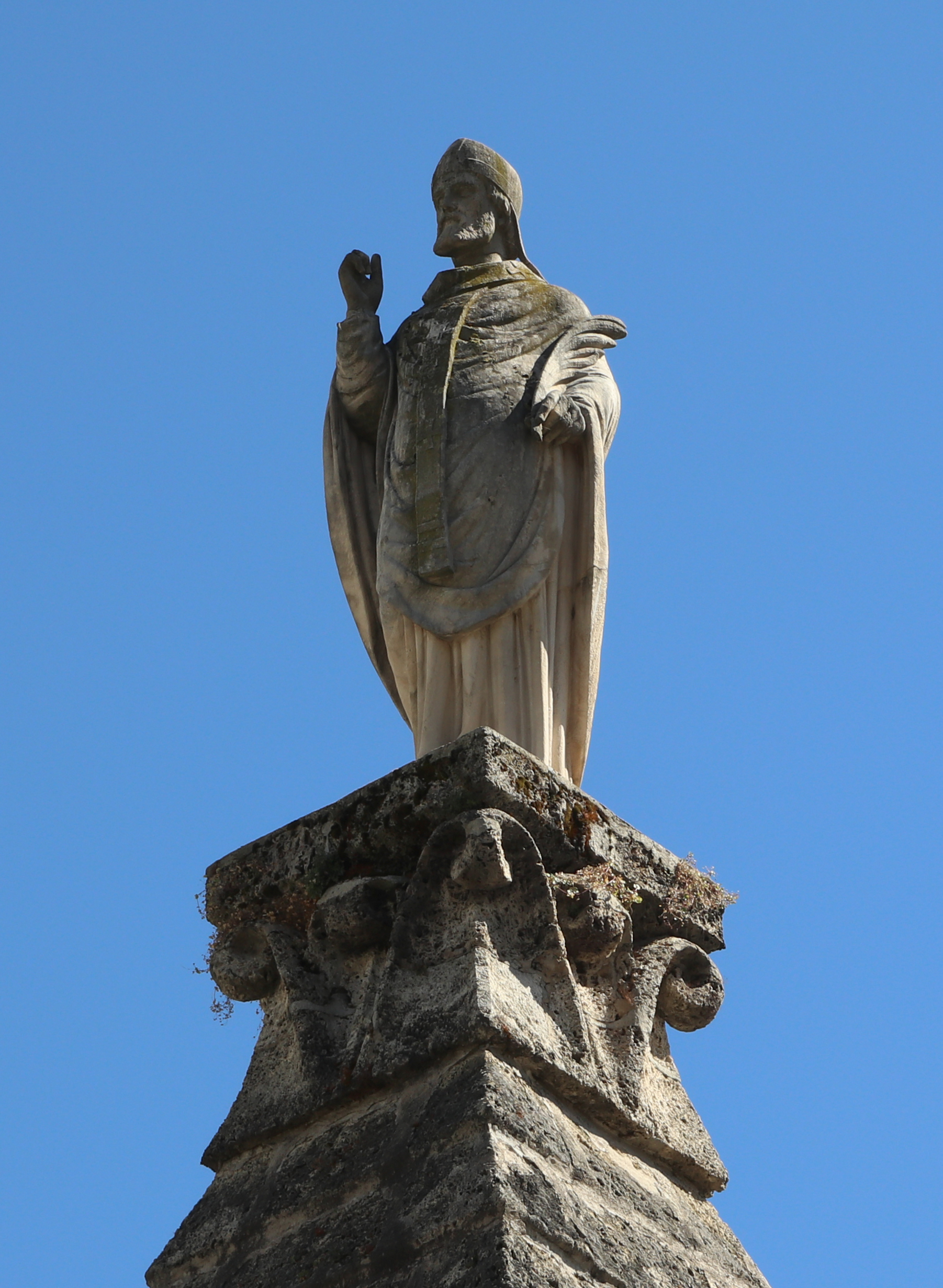
Saint Ferjus in the old cemetery of La Tronche (Isère).

Saint Ferjus of Grenoble (or Ferreol) was the bishop of Gratianopolis (current Grenoble) in the 7th century. He was assassinated about 660 A.D., probably on the instruction of Clotaire III, meeting the same fate as other bishops who defied Clotair's authority.

== Hagiography ==
There are two theories regarding the life and death of Ferjus. A summary of his life written in the seventeenth century recounts that Saint Ferjus, was preaching at Mount Esson (Current Mont Rachais) above Grenoble when he was overwhelmed by an assassin who struck him on the head and threw him into a burning oven. Grenoble was buried in the church where he used to preach, which subsequently was dedicated in his name.

The second theory is that Ferjus was assassinated around 660 A.D., by Clotaire III or the mayor of the palace Ebroin, like other bishops who defied his authority. His feast day is 12 January.

== Legacy ==
The relics of Saint Ferjus are preserved in La Tronche located in the suburbs of Grenoble. Until 1935, the bell tower of St. Mary in Grenoble carried statues of Saint-Bruno, Saint-Hugues, St. Ferjus and St. Francis de Sales. In 1935, the tower threatened to collapse and the four statues were removed. The four sculptures disappeared during the Second World War, and only the statue of Francis de Sales was found in 2007 in Thiers Street, in the garden of the sanatorium which closed down. The statue of Ferjus remains lost.
