= Thomas Hache =

- Born: 1664; Grenoble, France
- Died: 1747 (aged 82–83); Grenoble, France
- Occupation: Furniture maker
- Relatives: Jean-François Hache (grandson)

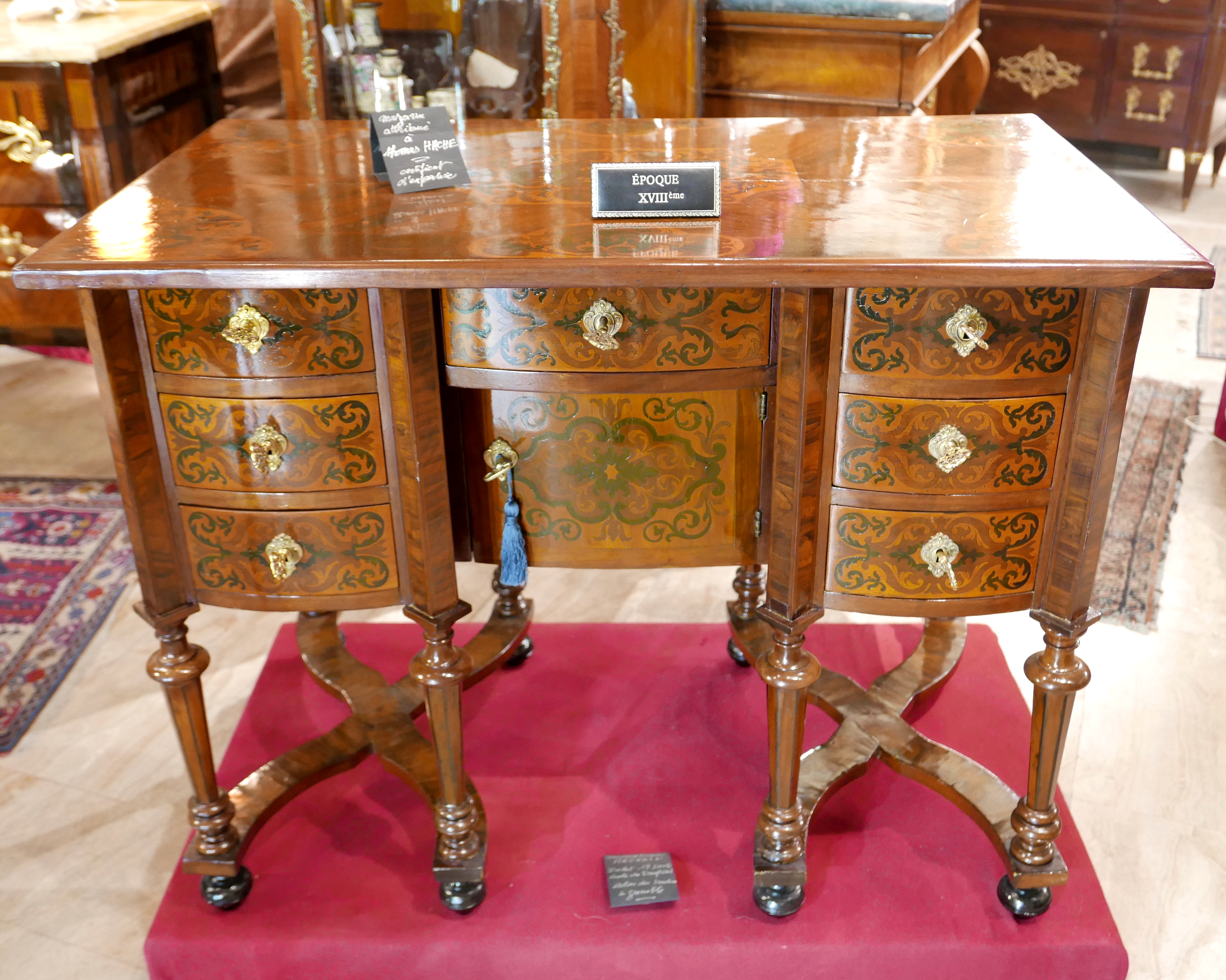
Mazarin desk by Hache

Thomas Hache (1664–1747) was a French ébéniste.

== Early life ==
Thomas Hache was born in 1664 in Grenoble. He learned Italian decoration in Chambery.

== Career ==
Hache was articled to Michel Chevalier. From 1721 onwards, he designed furniture for the Duchess of Orleans.

== Death and legacy ==
Hache died in 1747. His grandson, Jean-François Hache, became a notable ébéniste.
