= Jean-François Hache =

- Born: 1730
- Died: 1796 (aged 65–66)
- Occupation: Furniture maker
- Relatives: Thomas Hache (paternal grandfather)

Jean-François Hache (1730-1796) was a French ébéniste.

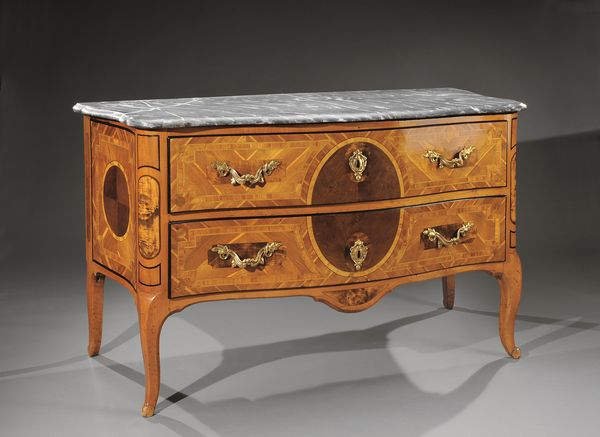
Commode designed by Hache.
