= Musée de la Résistance et de la Déportation =

Musée de la Résistance et de la Déportation may refer to:

- Musée de la Résistance et de la Déportation à Besançon
- Musée de la Résistance et de la Déportation à Grenoble
