= Eugénie du Colombier =

French painter (1806–1888)

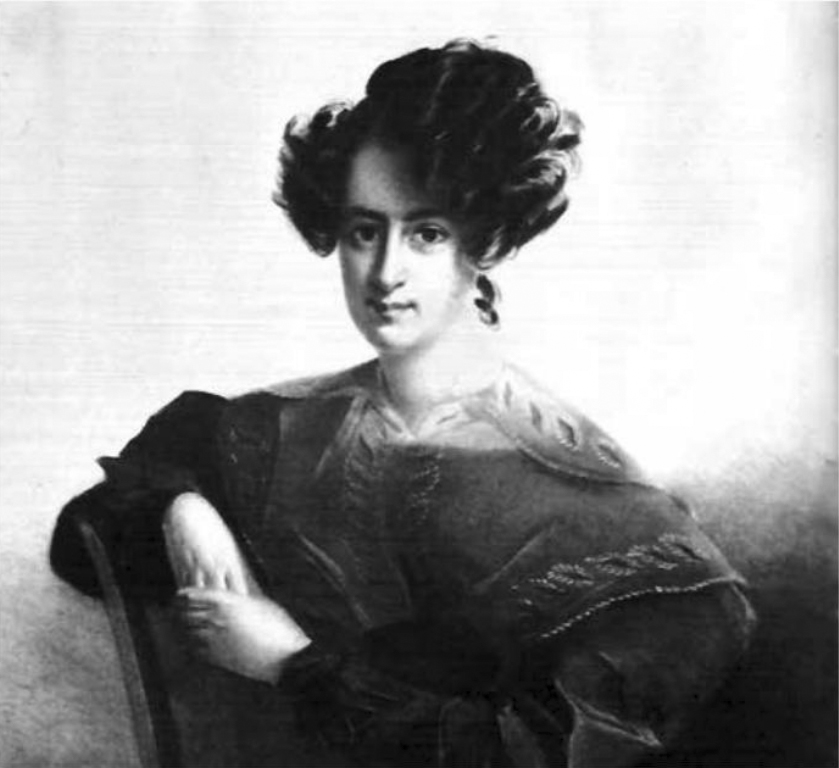
- Portrait of Eugénie du Colombier (before 1888) by an anonymous artist
- Born: Eugénie Chosson du Colombier; 27 September 1806; Saint-Albin-de-Vaulserre, or Saint-Hilaire-du-Rosier, France
- Died: 10 February 1888 (aged 81); Saint-Geoire-en-Valdaine, France
- Occupations: Painter, aristocrat
- Spouse: Anselme Pasquier de Franclieu

Eugénie du Colombier (née Eugénie Chosson du Colombier; 1806–1888) was a French painter and aristocrat. She was known for her portraits and landscape paintings, and also painted pottery. Du Colombier was considered one of the best Dauphiné painters of the early 19th-century.

== Biography ==
Eugénie Chosson du Colombier was born 27 September 1806, in either Saint-Albin-de-Vaulserre, or Saint-Hilaire-du-Rosier, France, and was the daughter of Aimée de Corbeau and César Chosson du Colombier. She is descended from Dauphinois parliamentary aristocracy on her paternal side.

In 1834, she married artist Anselme Pasquier de Franclieu. In 1842, they moved to Saint-Geoire-en-Valdaine, followed by a move into the Château de Longpra in 1844 after she inherited the home.

She was a student of French painter Benjamin de Rolland (1773–1855) for around ten years, and Swiss painter Joseph Hornung (1792–1870).

Her artworks Portrait of Charles Planelli de Lavalette (1832), and Portrait of Benjamin de Rolland (1833) can be found in the collection at the Museum of Grenoble.

She died on 10 February 1888 in Saint-Geoire-en-Valdaine.

== Gallery ==
Paintings by Eugénie Chosson du Colombier

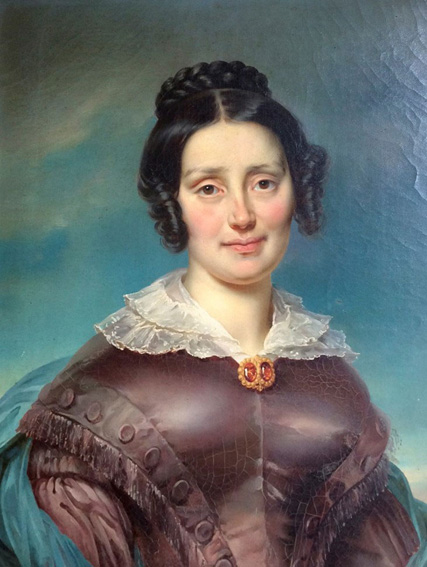
Augustine Pasquier de Franclieu, comtesse O'Mahony

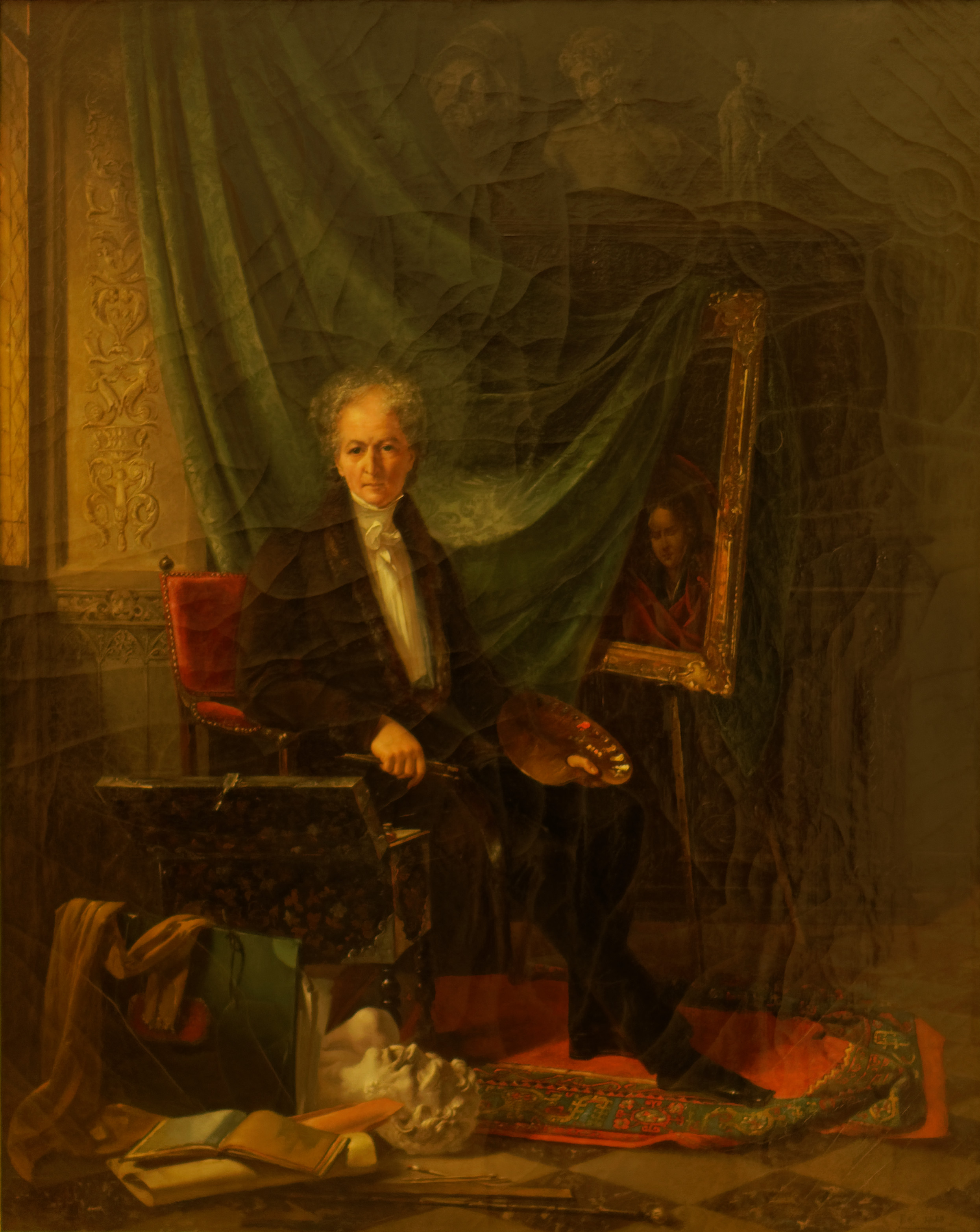
Benjamin de Rolland in his atelier (1833)
(Museum of Grenoble)

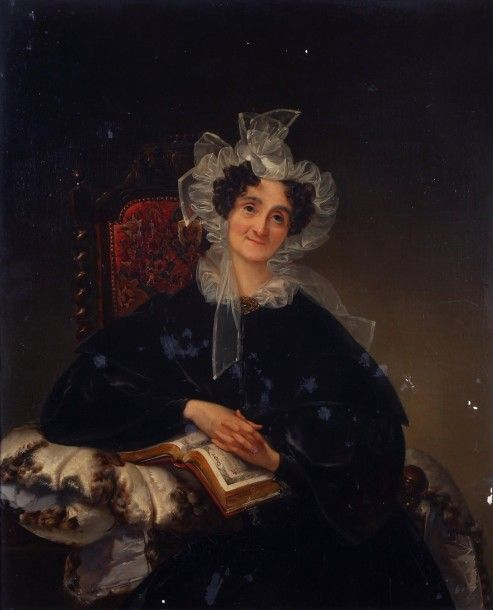
Madame Chosson du Colombier

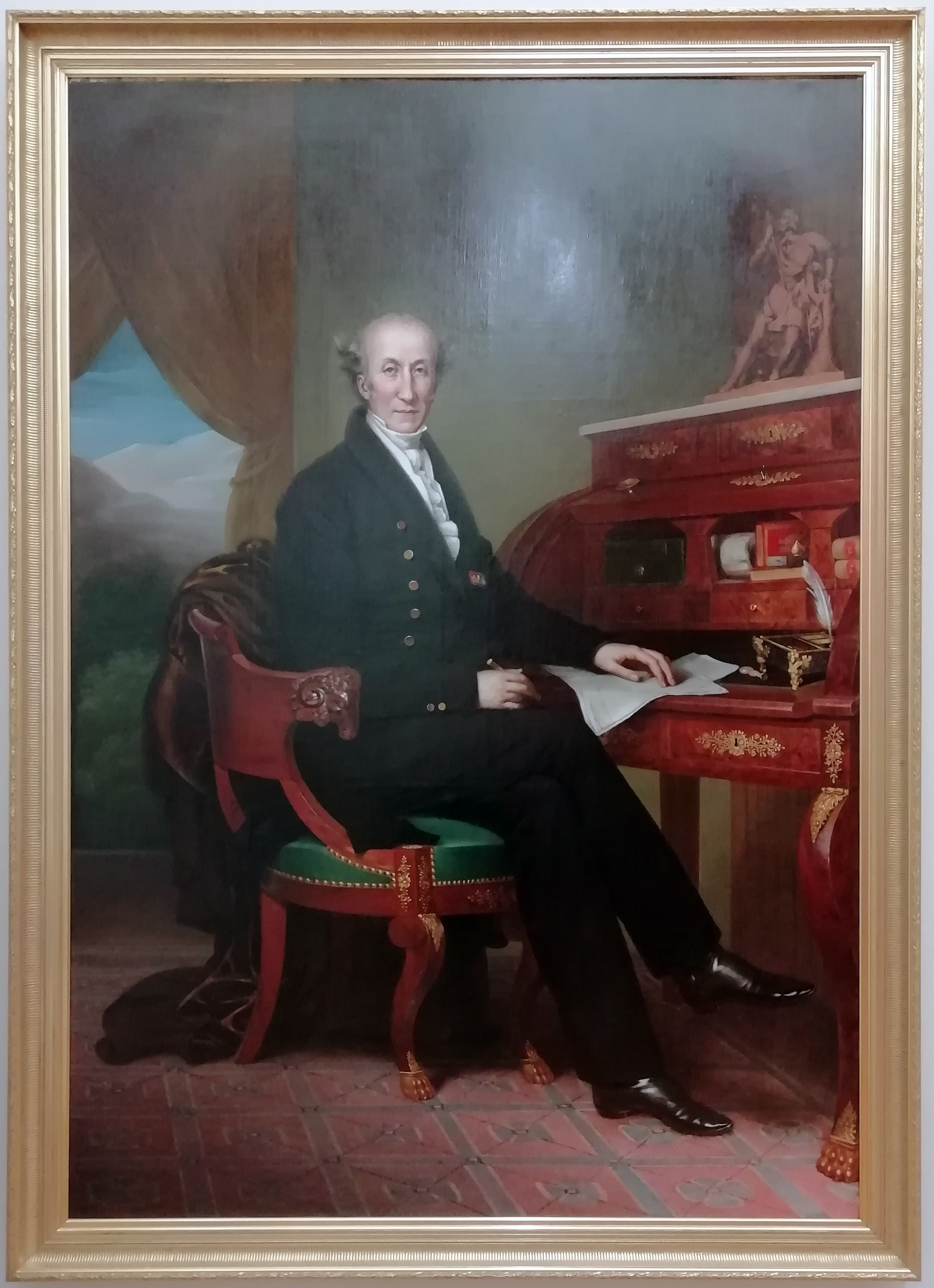
Charles Planelli de Lavalette
(Museum of Grenoble)
