= Saint Roch Cemetery =

Cemetery in Grenoble, France

Saint-Roch Cemetery
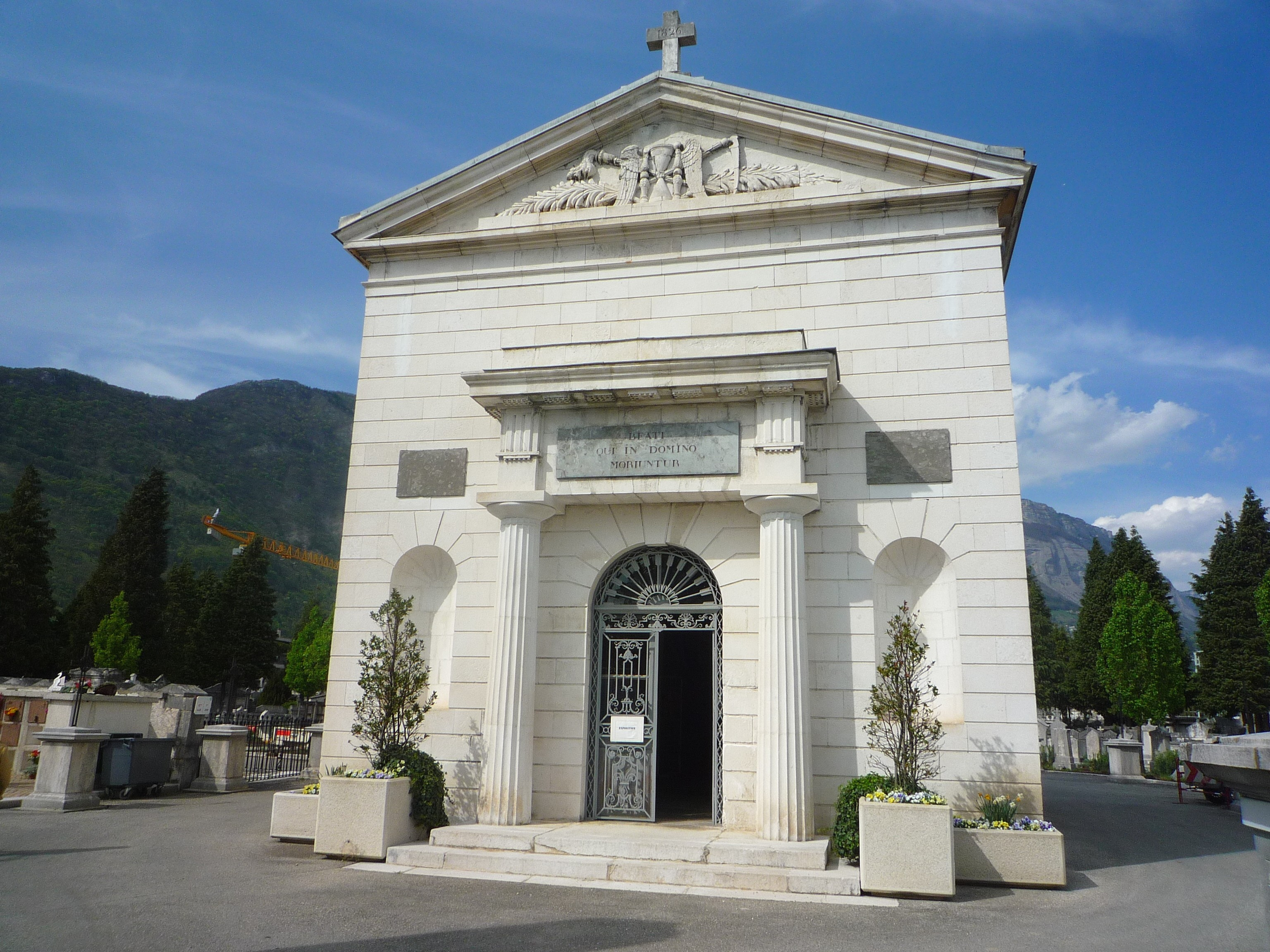
- Saint-Roch Chapel (1826)
- Interactive map of Saint-Roch Cemetery

Details
- Established: 1810
- Location: Grenoble
- Country: France
- Coordinates: 45°11′39″N 5°44′23″E
- Type: Public
- Size: 32.12 acres (13.00 ha)

Saint Roch Cemetery (French: Cimetière Saint-Roch) is the first municipal cemetery in the city of Grenoble, France. It was blessed by the bishop of Grenoble Claude Simon on 19 August 1810. It is the largest cemetery in the city with 13 ha (32.12 acres).

Located on the rue du Souvenir, alongside the Isère, in the district of Île Verte, it is the city's only intramural cemetery, currently containing 25,000 graves over an area of 13 hectares (32.12 acres). The city has another cemetery, that of Grand Sablon, in the adjacent city of La Tronche.

Among those buried here are political leaders, military personnel, scientists and artists. The most important tombs however are of manufacturers of gloves. The sculptors Victor Sappey, Henri Ding, Eustache Bernard, Aimé Charles Irvoy and Urbain Basset are also buried here.

Many mayors of the city since the French Revolution are buried in this cemetery, from Joseph-Marie de Barral, mayor in 1790, to Albert Michallon, mayor from 1959 to 1965, as are the painters Jules Flandrin and Jean Achard and Camille Teisseire, representative for Isère in the French Chamber of Deputies (1820–1824) and Chevalier de la Légion d'honneur.

The most prestigious monument in the cemetery is the Saint Roch Chapel, built during the Bourbon Restoration in 1826 to replace the old chapel of the same name, built in the 15th century near a hospital for lepers.
