= Musée de la Résistance et de la Déportation à Grenoble =

Museum in Grenoble, France

Musée de la Résistance et de la Déportation de l’Isère
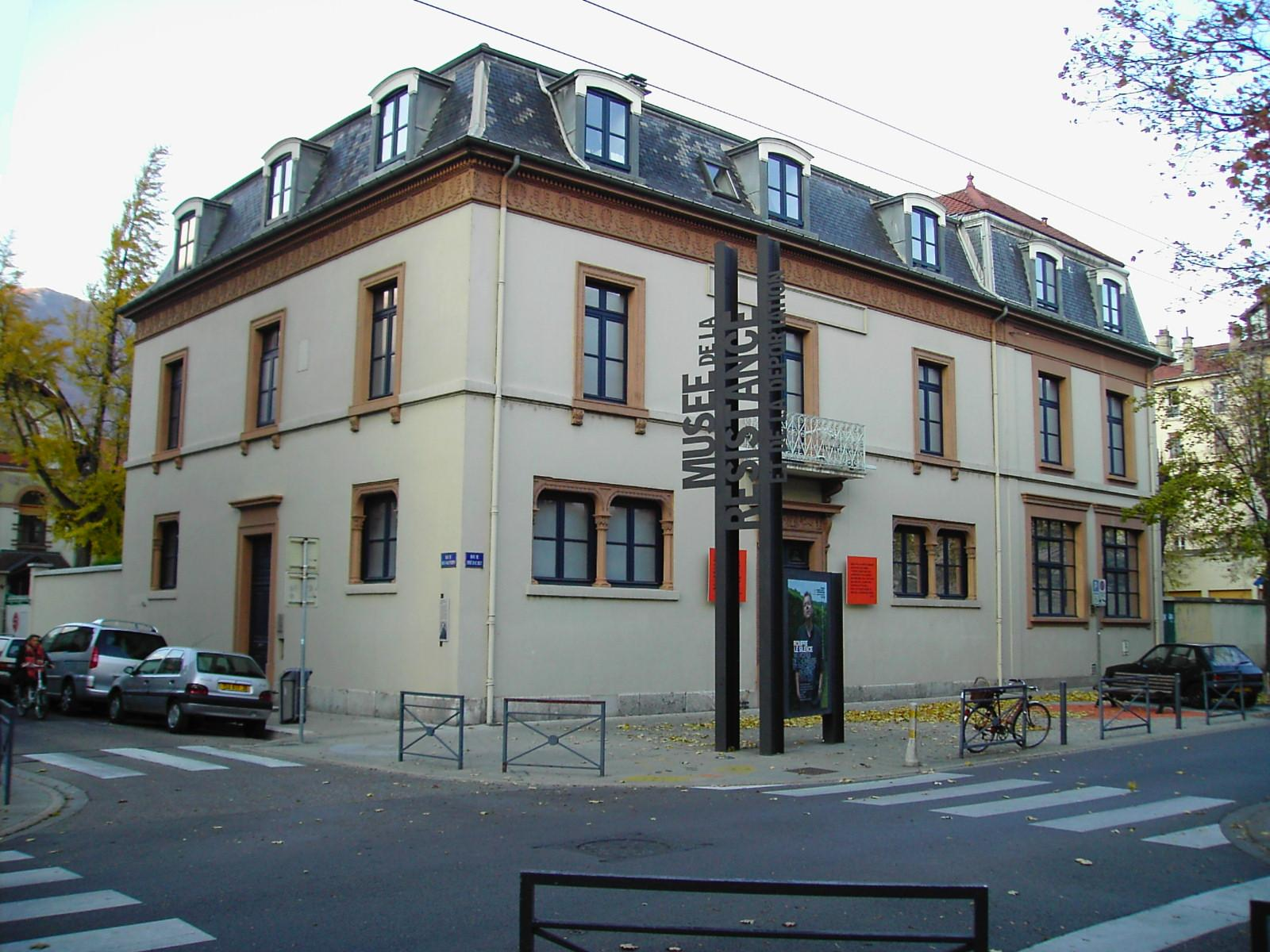
- Established: 1966
- Location: 14 rue Hébert, 38000 Grenoble, France
- Coordinates: 45.190132°N 5.735228°E
- Type: musée de société
- Visitors: 22,330 (2009)
- Website: Official site

The Musée de la Résistance et de la Déportation de l’Isère is a museum located in Grenoble, France.

The original museum, which opened in 1966, in the rue Jean Jacques Rousseau, was dedicated to local resistance networks and named the Musée de la Résistance Dauphinoise. The museum underwent significant renovations in the late 1980s, and early 1990s, and has been in its current premises in the rue Hébert since its reopening in 1994. The building originally housed the architectural sculpture school of Grenoble and the apartments of its director, the sculptor Aimé Charles Irvoy. Since its renovation in 1994, the museum has received three minor renovations, including an updated exhibition about the Jewish experience in wartime Grenoble.

The museum describes the specifics of the French Resistance in the Isère department, particularly in the Vercors during the Second World War. In addition to temporary exhibitions and the organization of events, the museum houses a permanent exhibition that shows a chronological presentation of the war events.

It contains about 5,000 works related to the Second World War.

== See also ==
- Maquis du Vercors
- Aimé Charles Irvoy
