= Victor Sappey =

French sculptor (1801–1856)

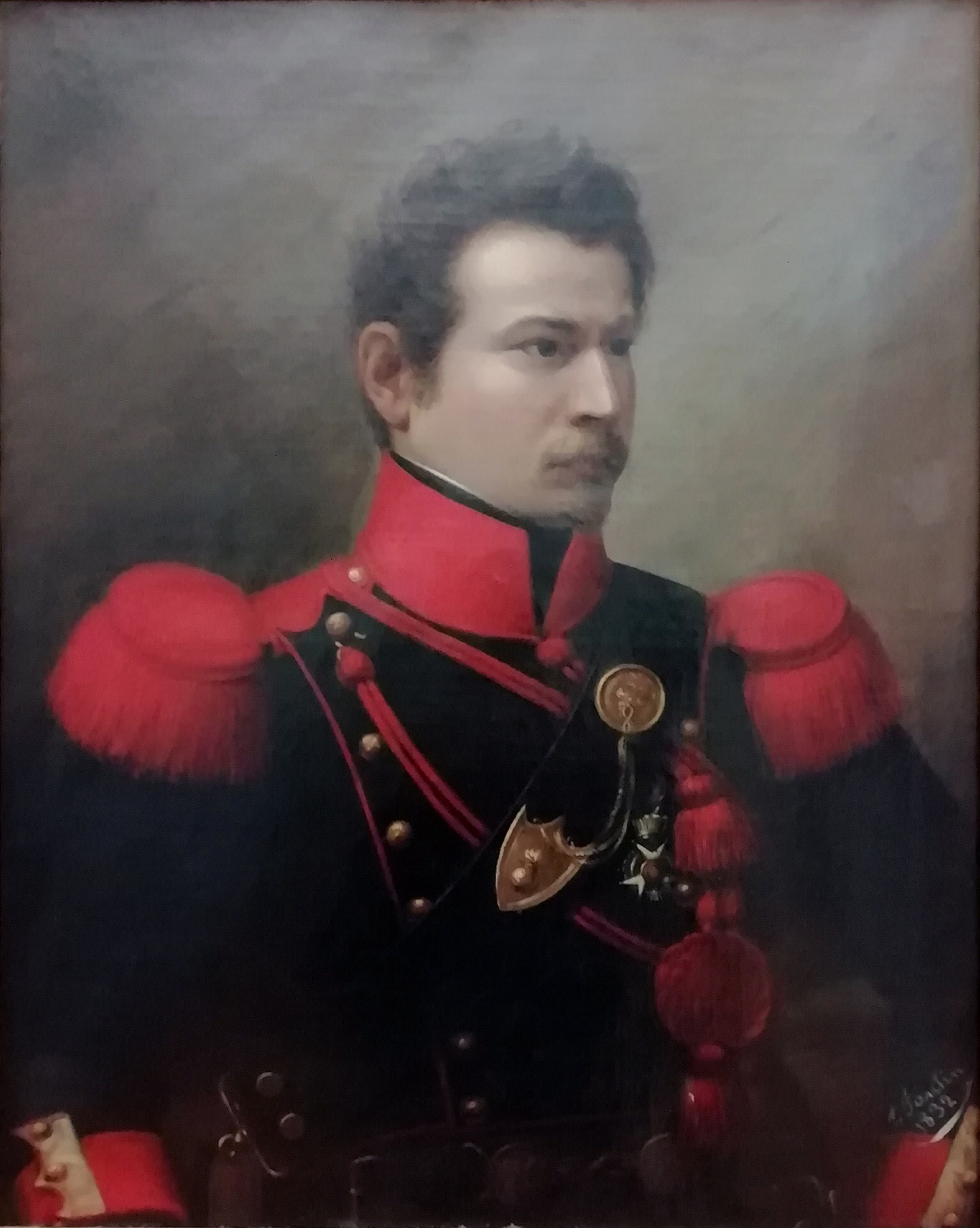
- Born: 11 February 1801; Grenoble, Isère, France
- Died: 23 March 1856 (aged 55)
- Other name: Pierre-Victor Sappey

Victor Sappey (11 February 1801, Grenoble - 23 March 1856), also known as Pierre-Victor Sappey, was a French sculptor.

== Career ==
In 1824, Sappey worked in Nicolas Raggi's atelier in Paris before living in Egypt for two years with his friend Jean Achard and a group of St. Simonians. He was among the first sculptors to use cement as a sculptural material. This can be seen in the statue "Génie des Alpes" in Uriage-les-Bains; though the original was destroyed, a model is kept at Musée dauphinois. Sappey also founded the Grenoble School of Architectural Sculpture, which he directed until his death. In addition to his sculptures, Sappey was also known for his caricatures.

== Personal life ==
Sappey was a friend of Théodore Ravanat and Henri Fantin-Latour, and was close to all members of the École dauphinoise that he attended in Proveysieux. He was also the father-in-law of the Grenoble sculptor Aimé Charles Irvoy (1824–1898), who had once been his student. His father was a stonemason.

== Selected works ==
=== In Grenoble, France ===
- "Le Drac" - terra cotta, 1833. It was named after the Drac. The Museum of Grenoble purchased it in 1856.
- "Fontaine des dauphins" - stone. Also known as "Château d'eau de la Valette," this was erected as a tribute to former Grenoble mayor Marquis de Lavalette. The sculptor Nadon created the fountain while Sappey created the cherubs and dolphins.
- "Le serpent et le dragon" - stone and bronze, 1843. This fountain, located near the Saint-Laurent Bridge, was created following severe flooding. The lion symbolizes the city defeating the snake, or the Isère River.
- Alexandre Michal-Ladichèr - plaster, 1836. Acquired by the Museum of Grenoble in 1885.
- Self-portrait - terra cotta. At the Museum of Grenoble.
- Jacques de Vaucanson - plaster. Bust. At the Museum of Grenoble.
- Benjamin de Rolland - bronze. Medallion. At the Museum of Grenoble.
- "L'Enfant au poisson; La Pêche" - marble, 1849. At the Museum of Grenoble.
- "L'Isère" - terra cotta, 1835. Statuette. At the Museum of Grenoble.
- "La Mort de Lucrèce" - plaster, 1828. High-relief. At the Museum of Grenoble.
- "Le Géant des Alpes" - cement. 5 metres (16 ft) statue. This was destroyed but the Musée dauphinois has a model.
- Louis-Joseph Vicat - 1855. Bust. At the Museum of Grenoble.
- Monument to General Marchand - 1851. Tombstone. At Saint Roch Cemetery.
- Monument to Mrs Recoura - marble, 1855. Tombstone. At Saint Roch Cemetery.
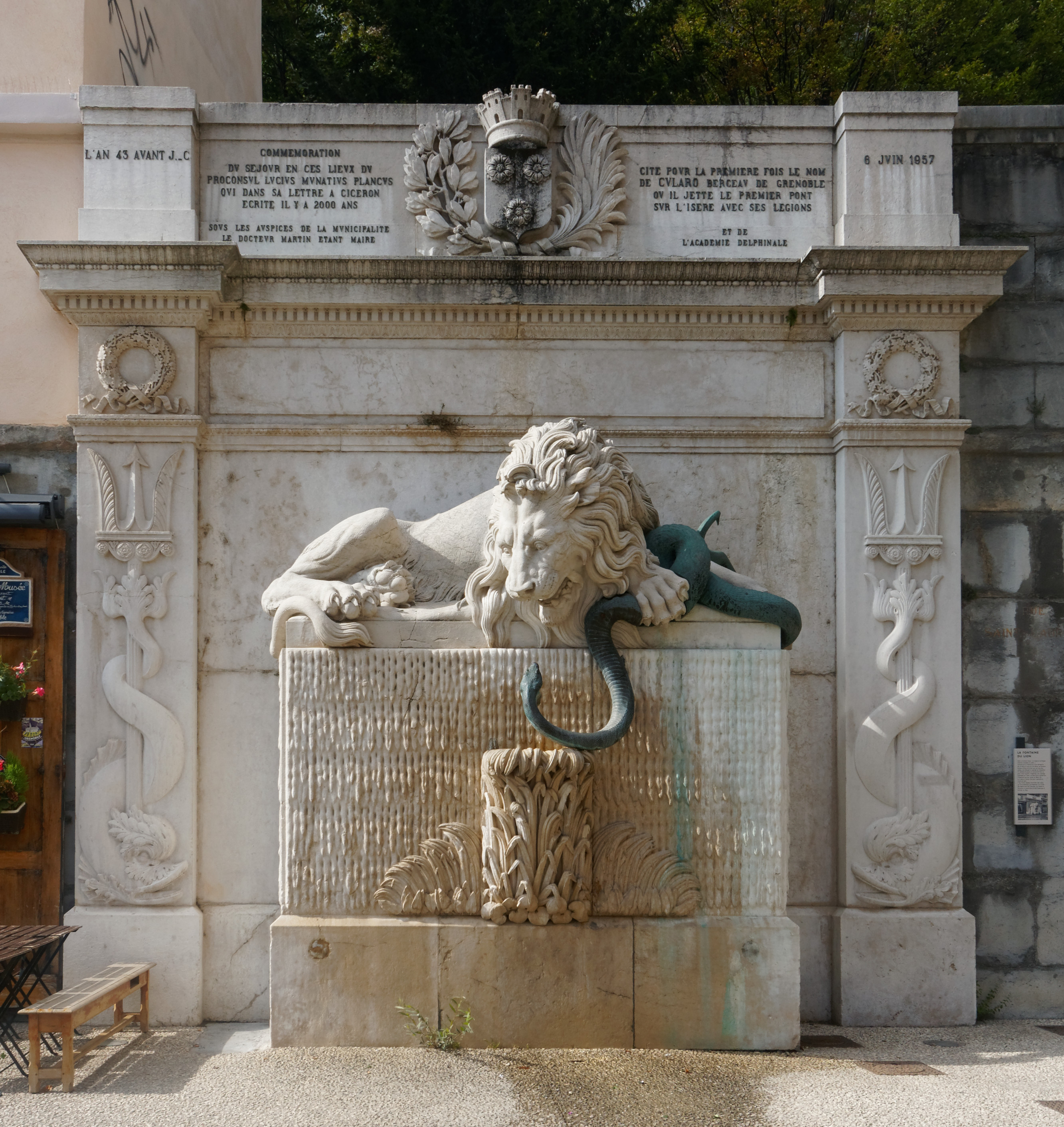
Le serpent et le dragon

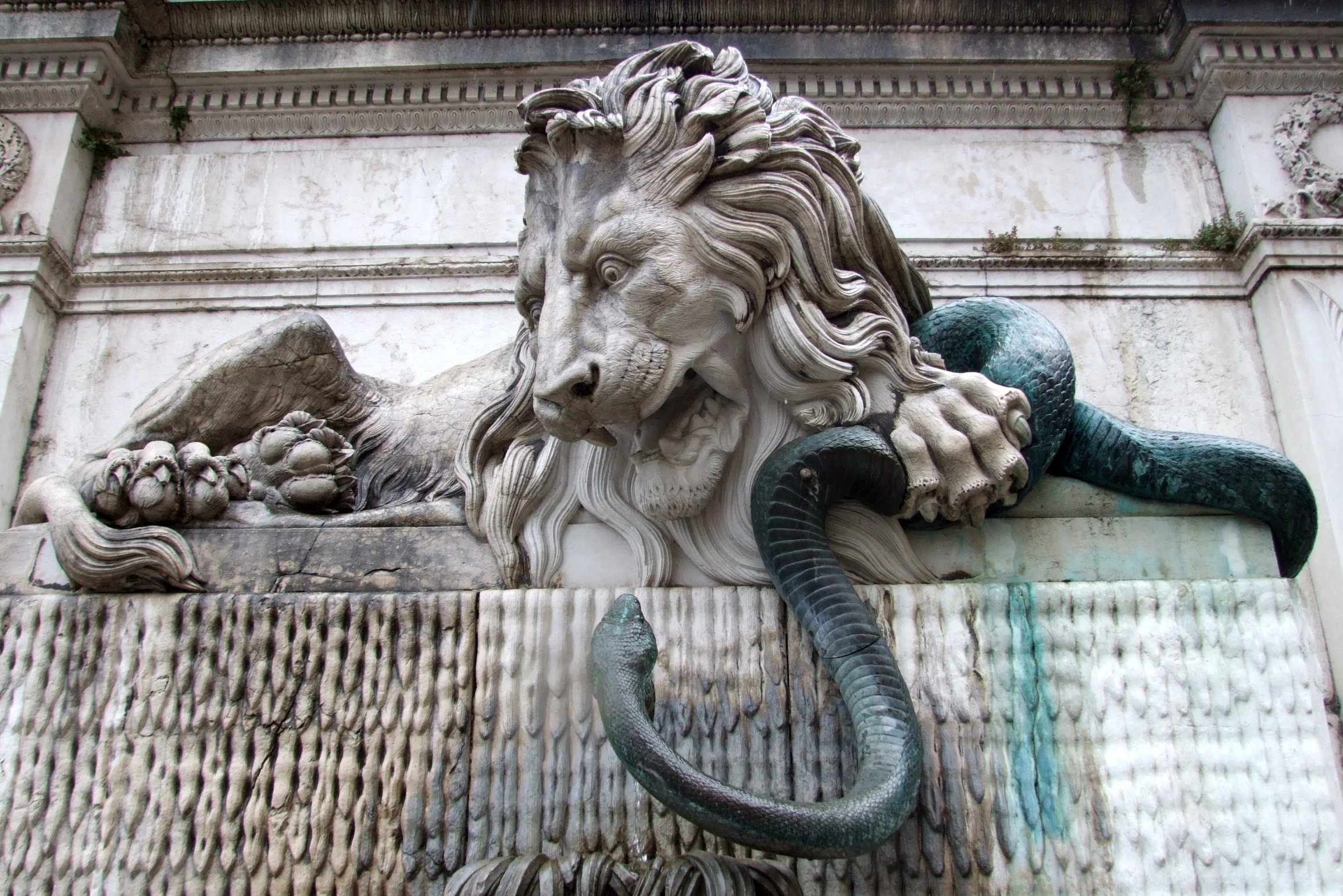
Le serpent et le dragon

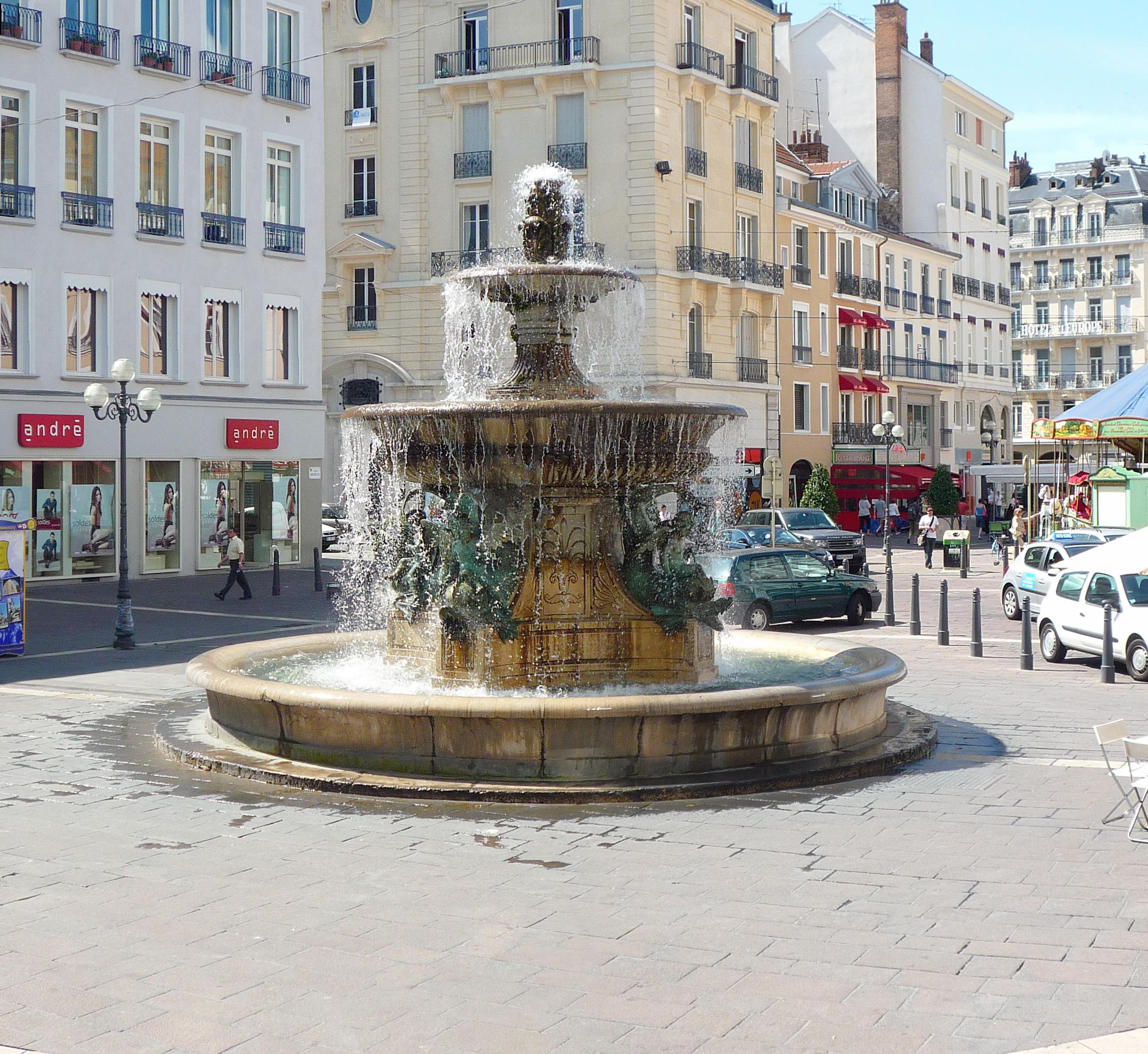
Fontaine des dauphins

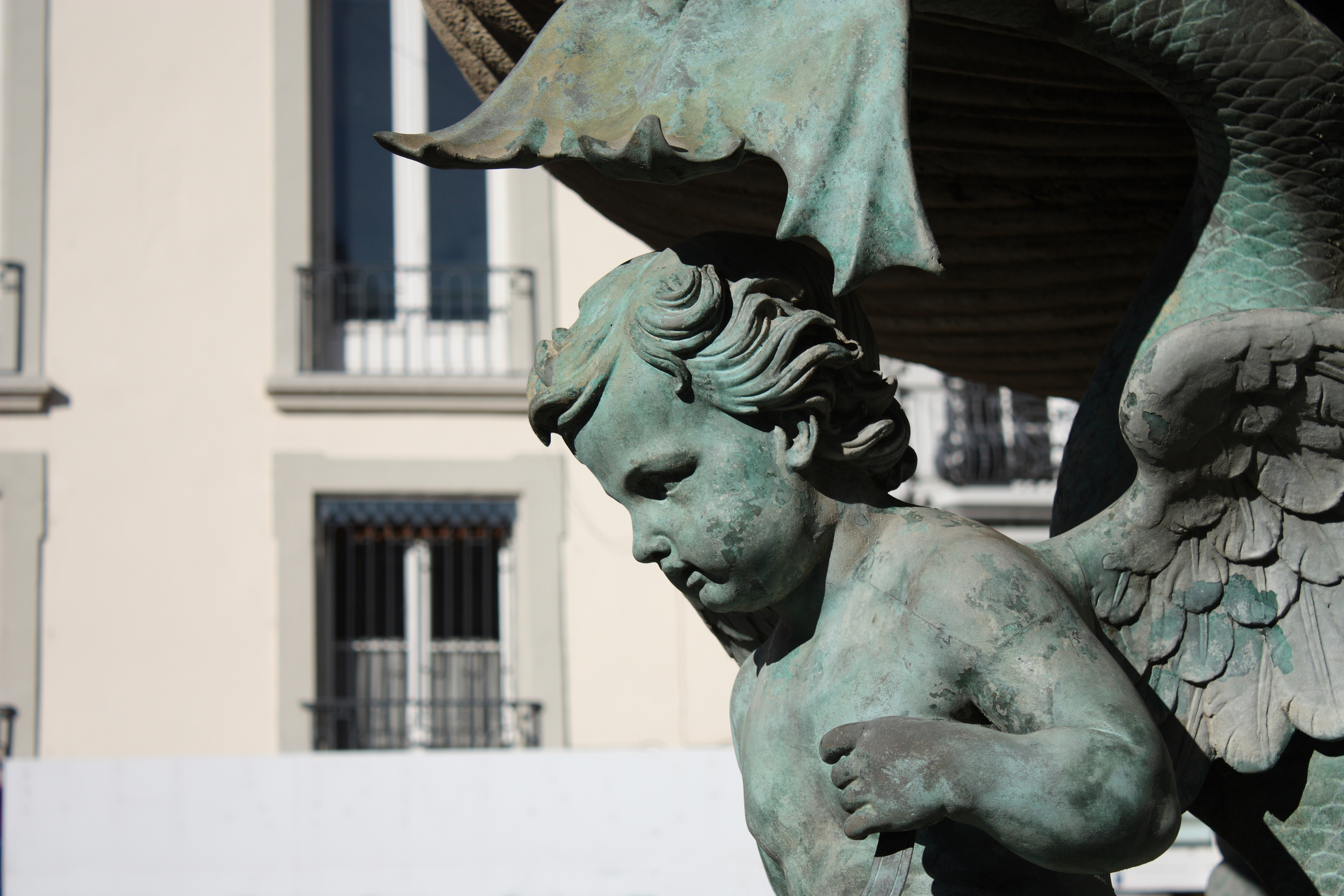
Fontaine des dauphins

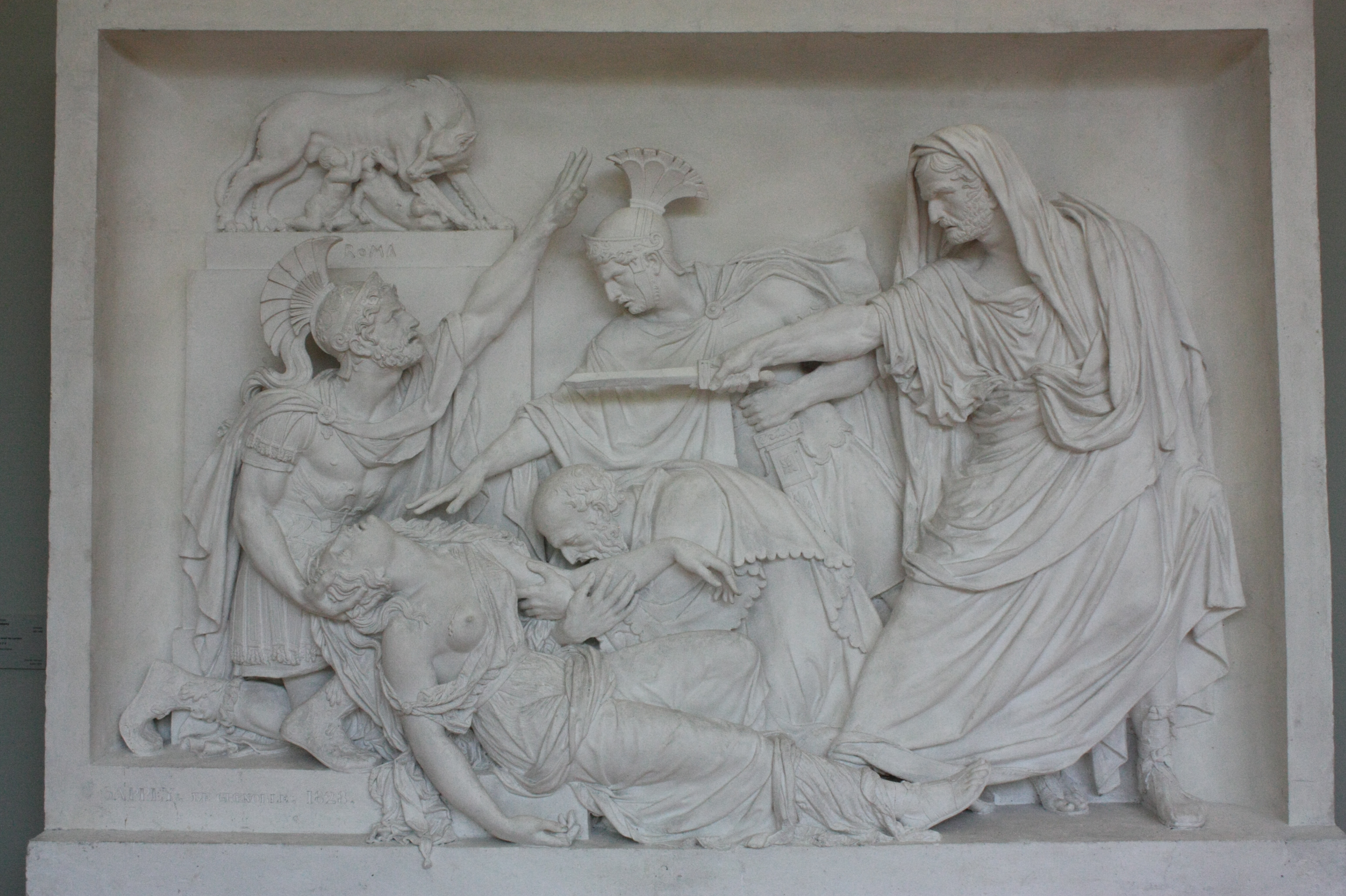
Mort de Lucrèce

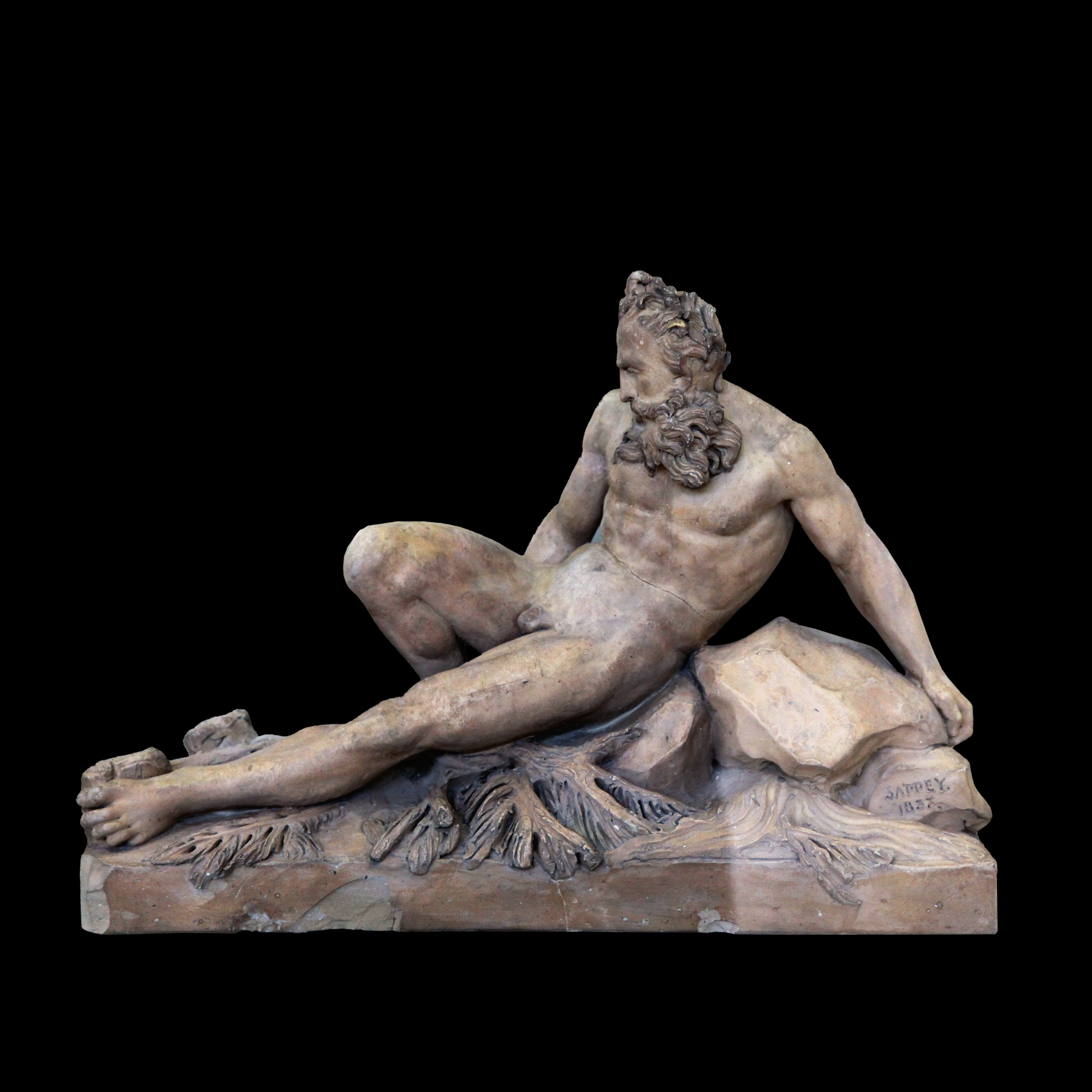
Le Drac

=== Elsewhere ===
- Chambéry: "Fontaine des éléphants" - bronze and cast iron, 1838. This was erected in honour of General Benoît de Boigne, a generous donor to the town, and specifically references his achievements in India.
- Uriage-les-Bains: "Fontaine de la nymphe" - stone, 1847. Also known as "Fontaine de la déesse Hygie." Depicts the goddess Hygieia.
- Valence, Drôme: Statue Jean-Étienne Championnet - bronze, 1848. The monument was restored in 2002.
- Voreppe: Amable Rome tombstones - stone. Tombstones created for Dr. Amable Rome and his son.
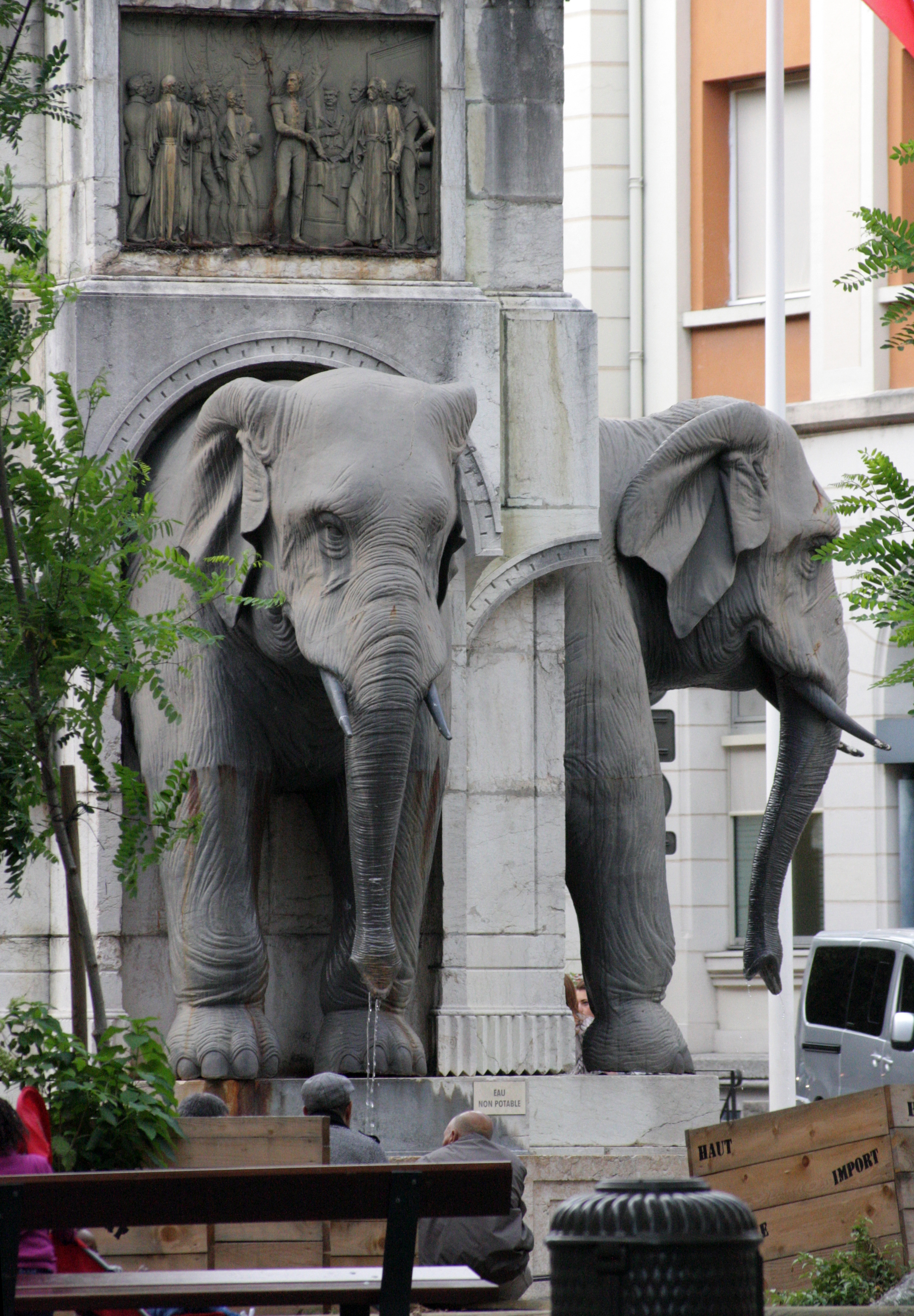
Fontaine des éléphants

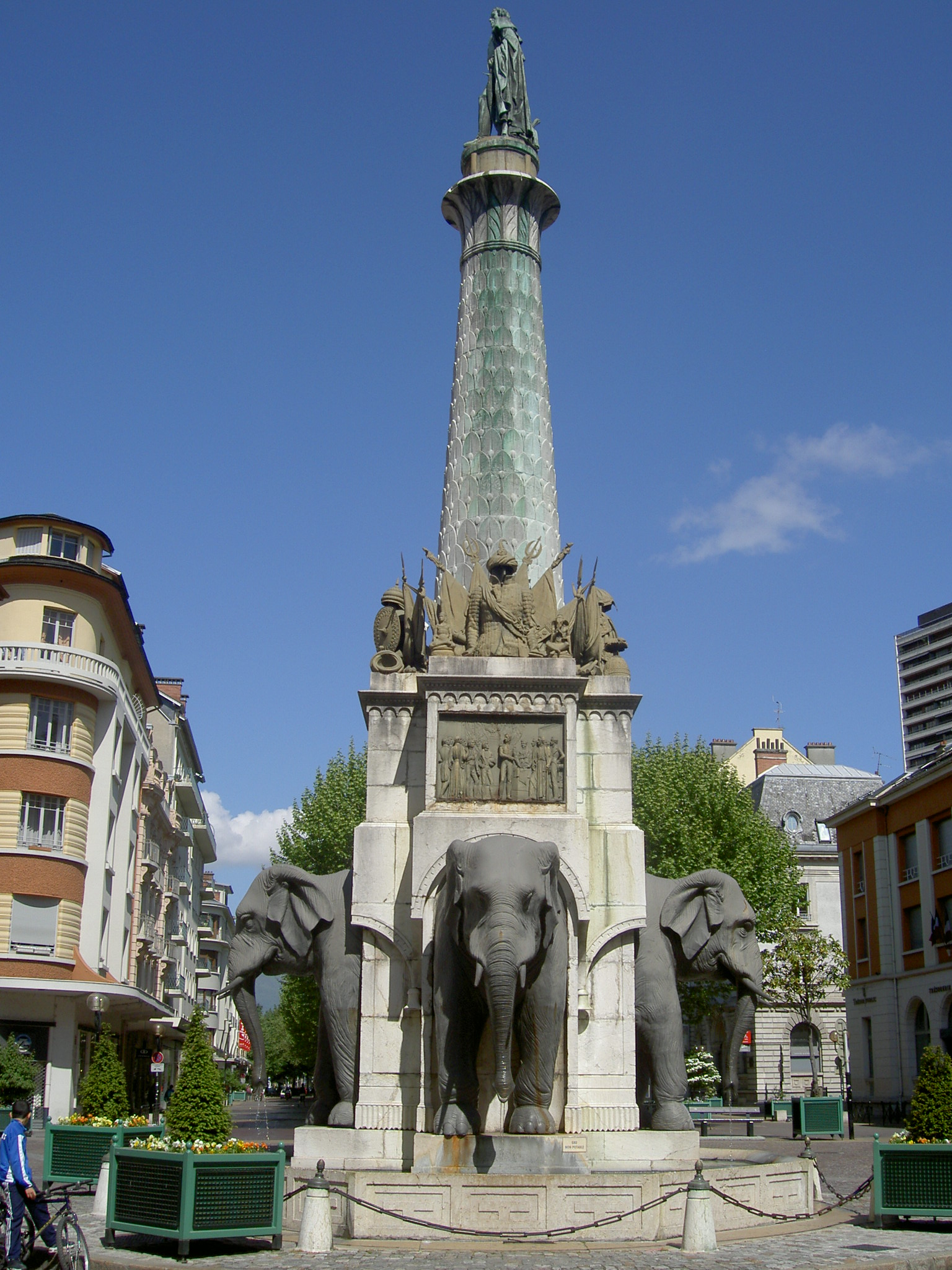
Fontaine des éléphants

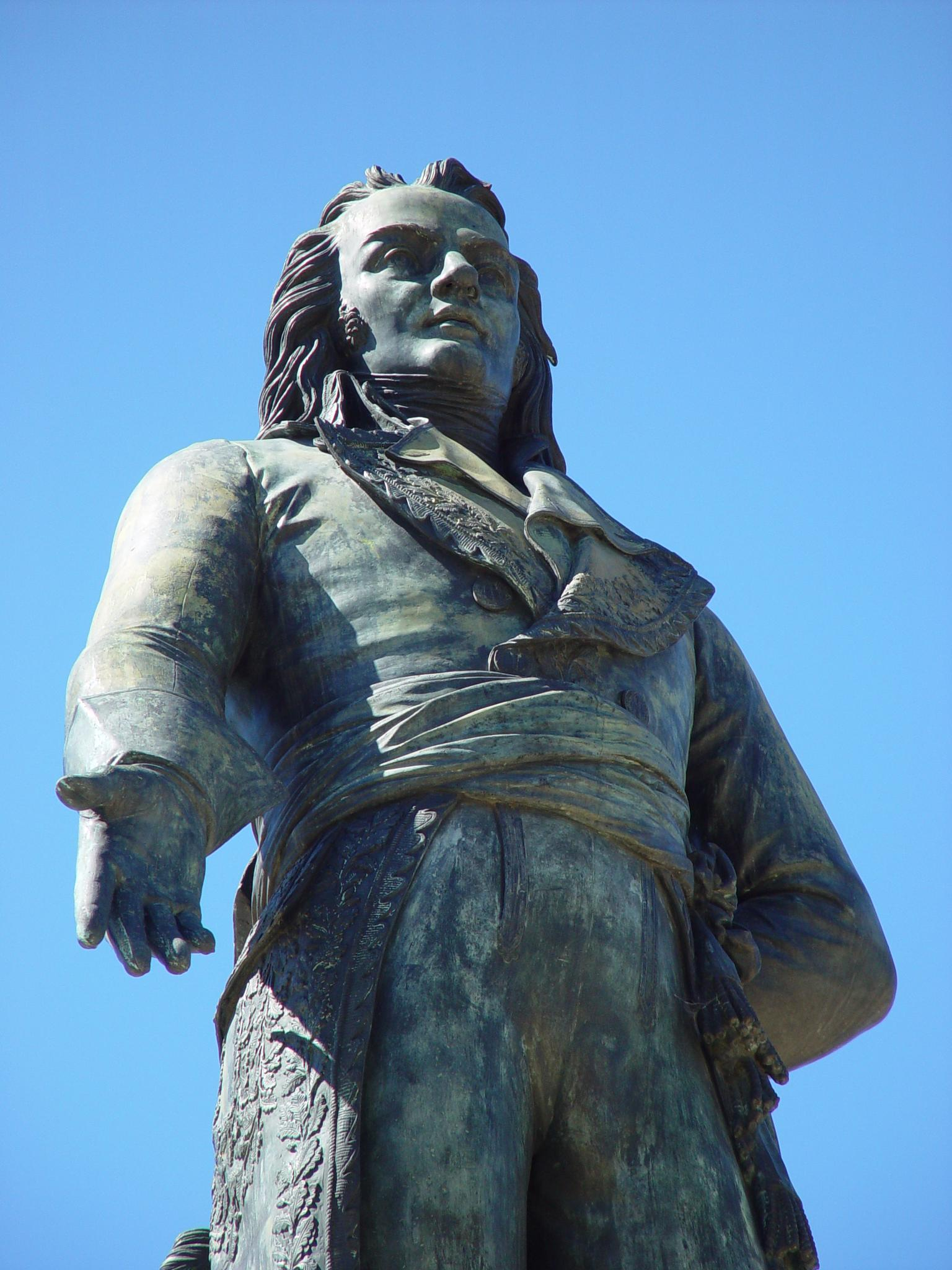
Statue Jean Étienne Vachier Championnet

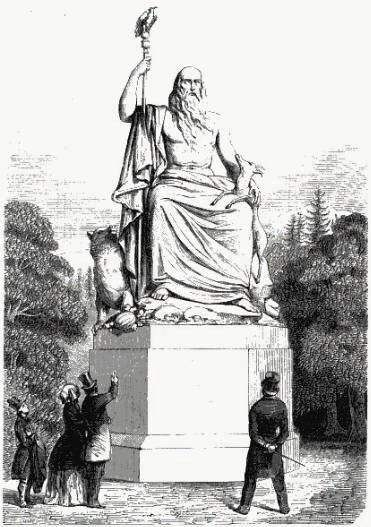
Le Géant des Alpes
