= Benjamin Rolland =

French painter (1773–1855)

Benjamin de Rolland
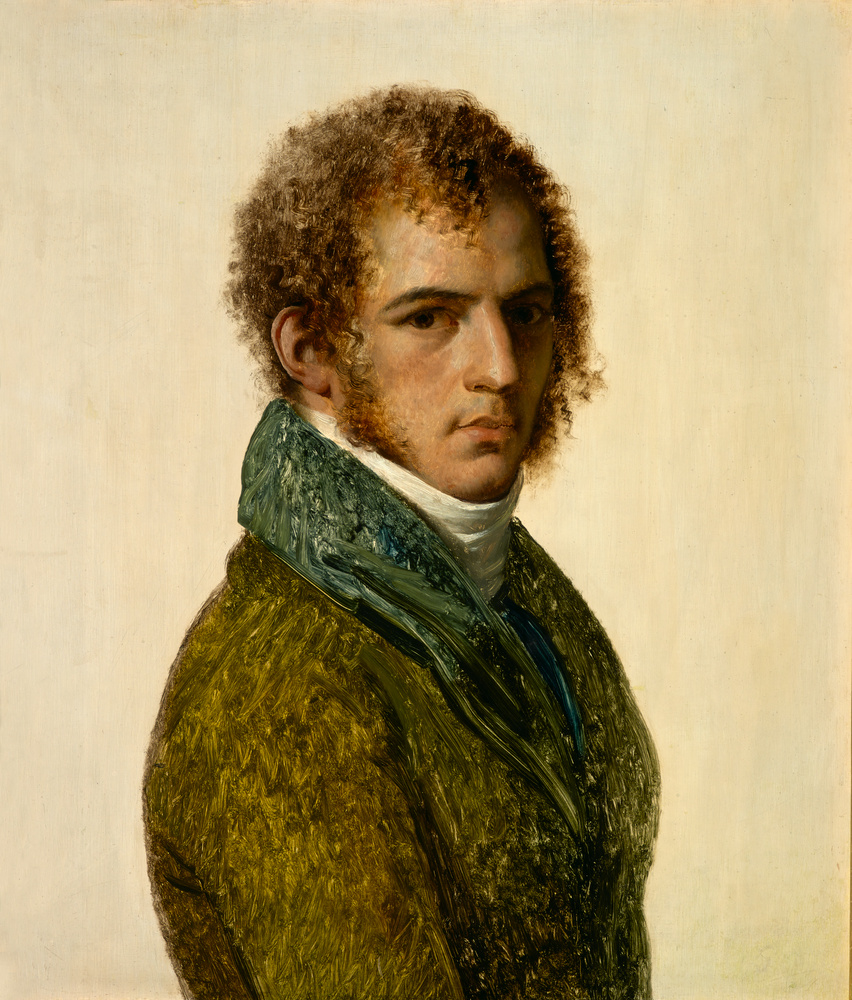
- Portrait by Anne-Louis Girodet-Trioson, 1816; Musée de Grenoble
- Born: 23 April 1773; Guadeloupe, French West Indies
- Died: 24 March 1855 (aged 81); Grenoble, Isère, France
- Other name: Le déterminé furieux
- Education: Jacques-Louis David at the Louvre, Paris
- Occupations: Portraitist; Court painter; Museum director; Director of Academy of Arts; Author
- Known for: Painting
- Movement: Academic art Neoclassicism; French School; Romanticism
- Patrons: Joachim Murat, King of Naples

Benjamin Rolland, or Benjamin de Rolland (23 April 1773, Guadeloupe – 24 March 1855, Grenoble, Isère), was a French history painter and student of David. He held a number of high-profile art appointments, including court painter; museum curator and director; and art academy professor and director.

== Biography ==
Benjamin de Rolland was born in 1773, on the island of Guadeloupe and was of French Creole descent and Carcassonne nobility. He left Guadeloupe around the age of 13 to pursue his education in Paris, France.

De Rolland befriended and studied with Guillaume Guillon-Lethière at his atelier in Rue Childebert, Saint-Germain-des-Prés, who brought together a whole French Caribbean society in Paris, under the leadership of Joséphine de Beauharnais, such as General Thomas-Alexandre Dumas with his son, the writer Alexandre Dumas père and Chevalier de Saint-George.

A student of Jacques-Louis David in the late 1790s before being appointed court painter in 1807 and tutoring King Joachim Murat's children at the Royal Palaces of Caserta and Naples. He painted many neoclassical portraits of members of the royal and aristocratic families.

From 1817 to 1853, he served as the director and curator of the Museum of Grenoble. De Rolland also directed and taught at the city's School of Painting and Drawing, where his students included the artists Ernest Hébert, Théodore Fantin-Latour (father of Henri Fantin-Latour), Jules Guédy, Alexandre Debelle, Victor Sappey and Eugénie Chosson du Colombier.

Benjamin de Rolland exhibited regularly at the Paris Salons, held at the Louvre Palace in 1801, 1806, 1808, 1817, 1819, 1822, and 1824.

The Louvre, the Musée d'Orsay, the Musée de Grenoble, the Musée des Beaux-Arts de Lyon, Museo Mario Praz and the Royal Palace of Caserta are among the cultural institutions that have a number of his paintings in their permanent collections.

== Gallery ==
Paintings by Benjamin de Rolland

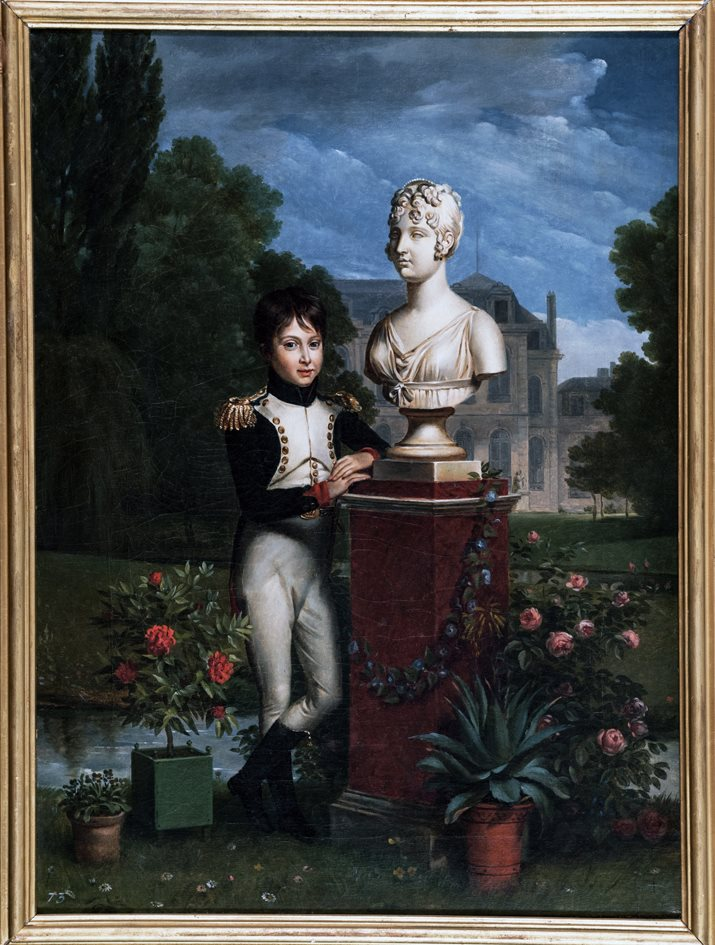
Achille Murat with the bust of his mother, 1811 (Royal Palace of Caserta)

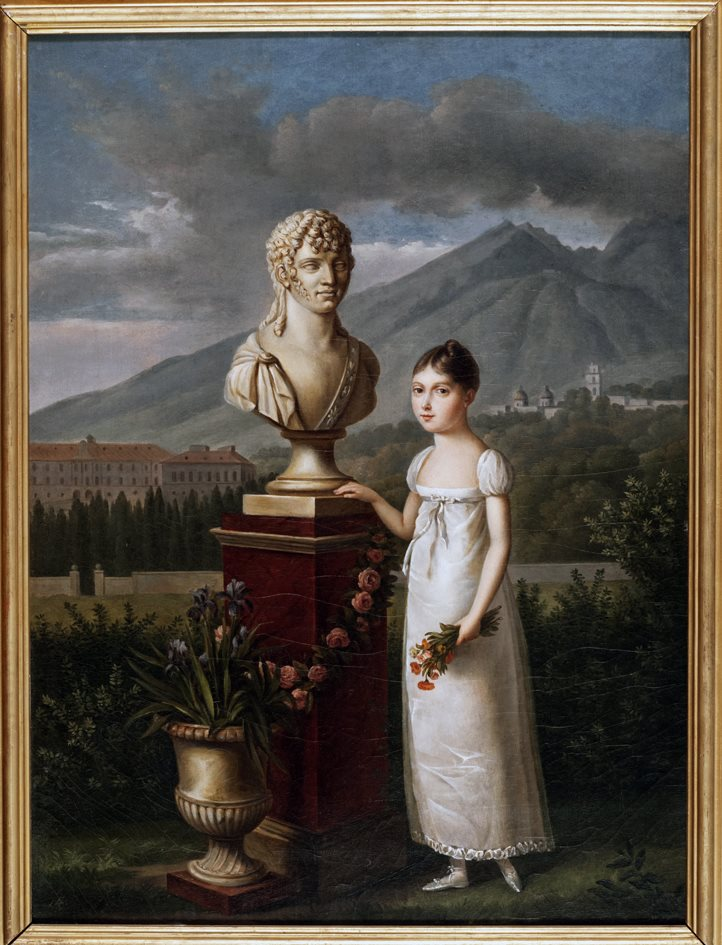
Letizia Murat with the bust of her father, 1811 (Royal Palace of Caserta)

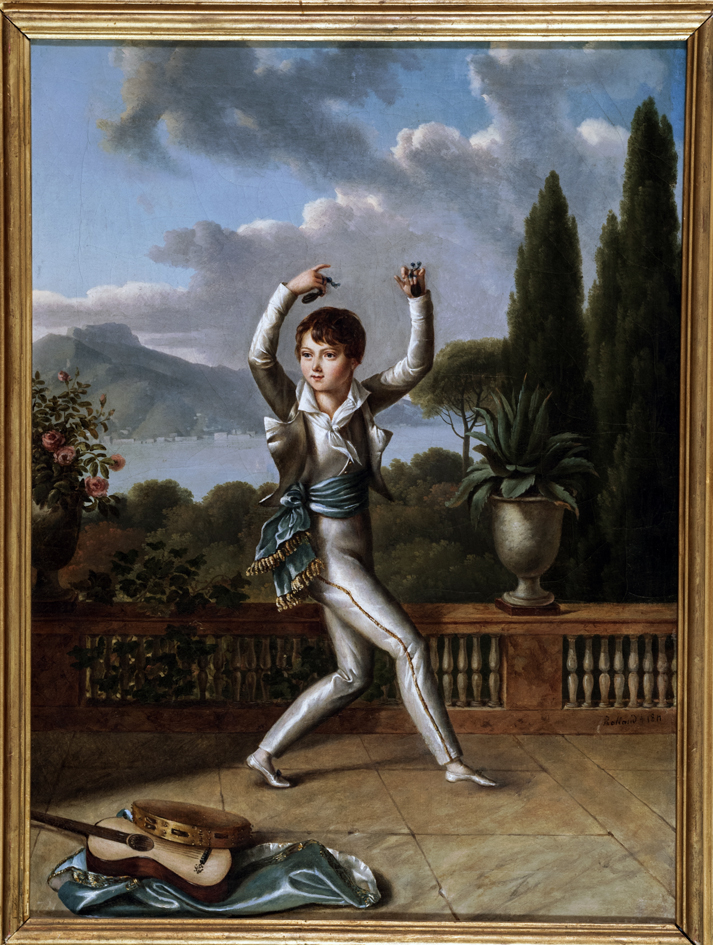
Lucien Murat dancing the tarantella, 1811 (Royal Palace of Caserta)

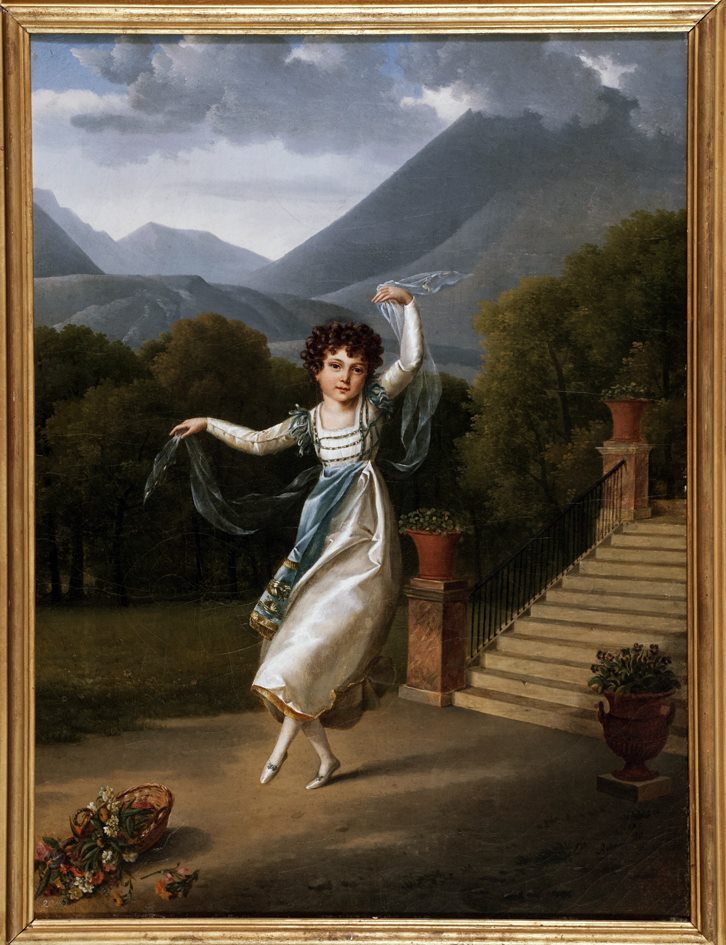
Luise Murat dancing the tarantella, 1811 (Royal Palace of Caserta)

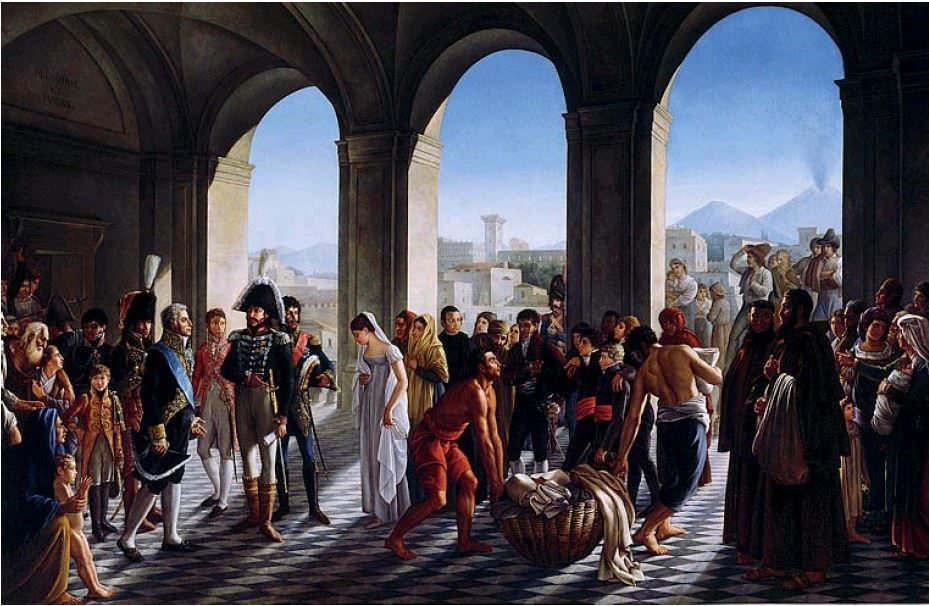
Joachim Murat and his family visit the Ospedale L'Albergo Reale dei Poveri, Naples, 1814
(Royal Palace of Caserta)

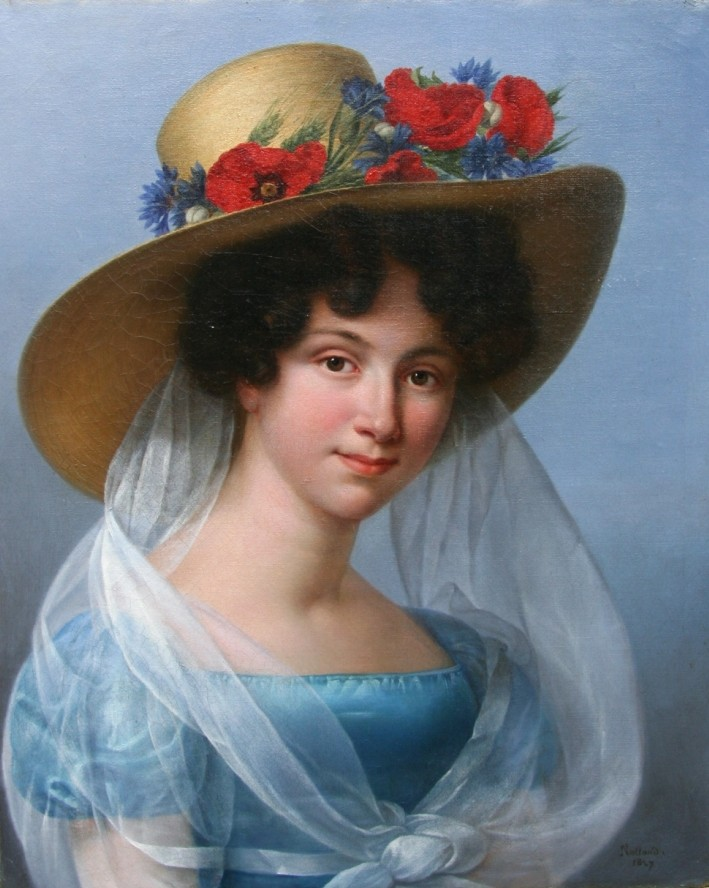
Mathilde Joséphine Hélène Perier, baronne de Chabaud-Latour, at the age of 15 (1827)

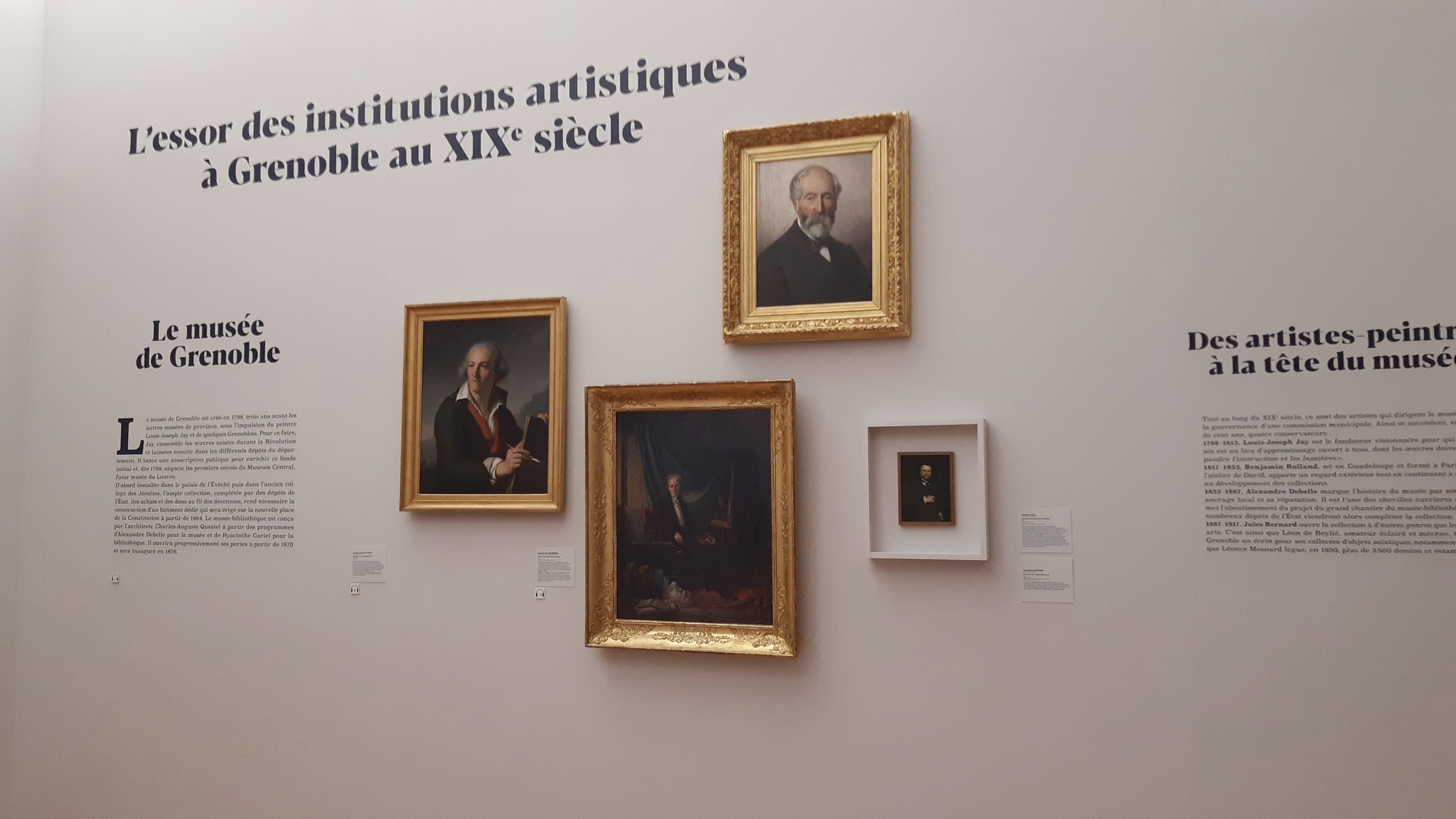
Exhibition of Grenoble and its Artists in the 19th-century, 2020
(Musée de Grenoble)

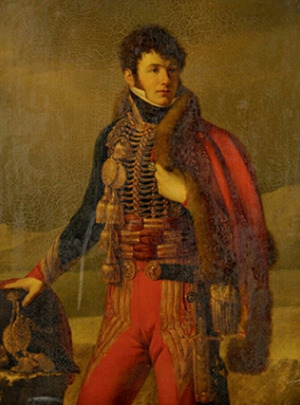
Portrait of Vivant-Jean Brunet-Denon, baron de l'Empire, 1806

== Museum collections ==
- Louvre Museum
- Musée d'Orsay
- Musée de Beaux-Arts de Lyon
- Musée de Grenoble
- Museo Nacional del Romanticismo, Madrid
- Palais Fesch-musée des beaux-arts
- Royal Palace of Caserta
- Musées de Sens
- Musée des Beaux-Arts de Bordeaux
- Musée des Beaux-Arts de Carcassonne
- Musée des Beaux-Arts de Saint-François
- Certosa di San Martino and Museo Nazionale di San Martino
- Galleria Nazionale d'Arte Moderna e Contemporanea, Rome – Museo Mario Praz
- Musée National du Château de Fontainebleau
- Chateau-musée de Gien, Chasse, histoire et nature en Val-de-Loire

== Iconography ==
- Anne-Louis Girodet de Roussy-Trioson, Portrait of Benjamin de Rolland, 1816. Musée de Grenoble acquisition from the model in 1847.
- Eugénie Chosson du Colombier, baronne Pasquier de Franclieu, Portrait of Benjamin de Rolland in his atelier, 1833. Musée de Grenoble acquisition from Mr Claude Auguste Bajat in 1855.
- Victor Sappey, Bronze medallion sculpture of Benjamin de Rolland, 1830. Musée de Grenoble acquisition from Mr Delage in 1911.

== Bibliography ==
- Musée du Louvre, Guillon Lethière, né à la Guadeloupe [Guillon Lethière, born in Guadeloupe] (catalogue de l'exposition du 13 novembre 2024 au 17 février 2025), Paris, Coédition musée du Louvre / Snoeck, en partenariat avec le Clark Art Institute, 2024, 12 p. (ISBN 9789461619259).
- Gallerie d'Italia - Naples, Napoli al tempo di Napoleone. Ribelle e luce del Golfo [Naples in the Time of Napoleon. Rebell and the Light of the Gulf] (Arte moderna. Cataloghi 23 novembre 2023 ‐ 7 Aprile 2024), Naples, Edizioni Gallerie d'Italia | Skira 2023. (ISBN 978-8857250823).
- Valérie Huss, Grenoble et ses artistes au XIX^{e} siècle (catalogue de l'exposition du 14 mars au 25 octobre 2020), Grenoble, Éditions Snoeck - Musée de Grenoble, 2020, 272 p. (ISBN 9461615949).
- Musée Marmottan Monet, Paris, Les Sœrs de Napoléon. Trois destins italiens [Italian Lives. Napoleon's Three Sisters] (catalogue de l'exposition du 3 octobre 2013 au 26 janvier 2014), Paris, Éditions Hazan - Musée Marmottan Monet, 2013, 190-196, 203 p. (ISBN 978-2-7541-0711-2).
- Jimmy Hammarberg, Benjamin Rolland, l'artiste qui venait d'ailleurs. [Benjamin Rolland, the artist who came from elsewhere] Master 1 Histoire de l'art, Université Pierre Mendès-France Grenoble II, 2004-2005.
- ROLLAND (Benjamin). - Catalogue des tableaux et objets d'art du musée de Grenoble. - Grenoble, 1844.
- ROLLAND (Benjamin). - Catalogue des tableaux, statues et autres objets d'art exposés dans le musée de Grenoble. - Grenoble: Imprimerie de Prudhomme, 1838.
- ROLLAND (Benjamin). - Catalogue des tableaux, statues et objets d'art exposés dans le musée de Grenoble. - Grenoble, 1834.
- ROLLAND (Benjamin). - Catalogue des tableaux et statues du musée de Grenoble, 1831.
