= Saint-Hilaire-du-Rosier =

- Commune
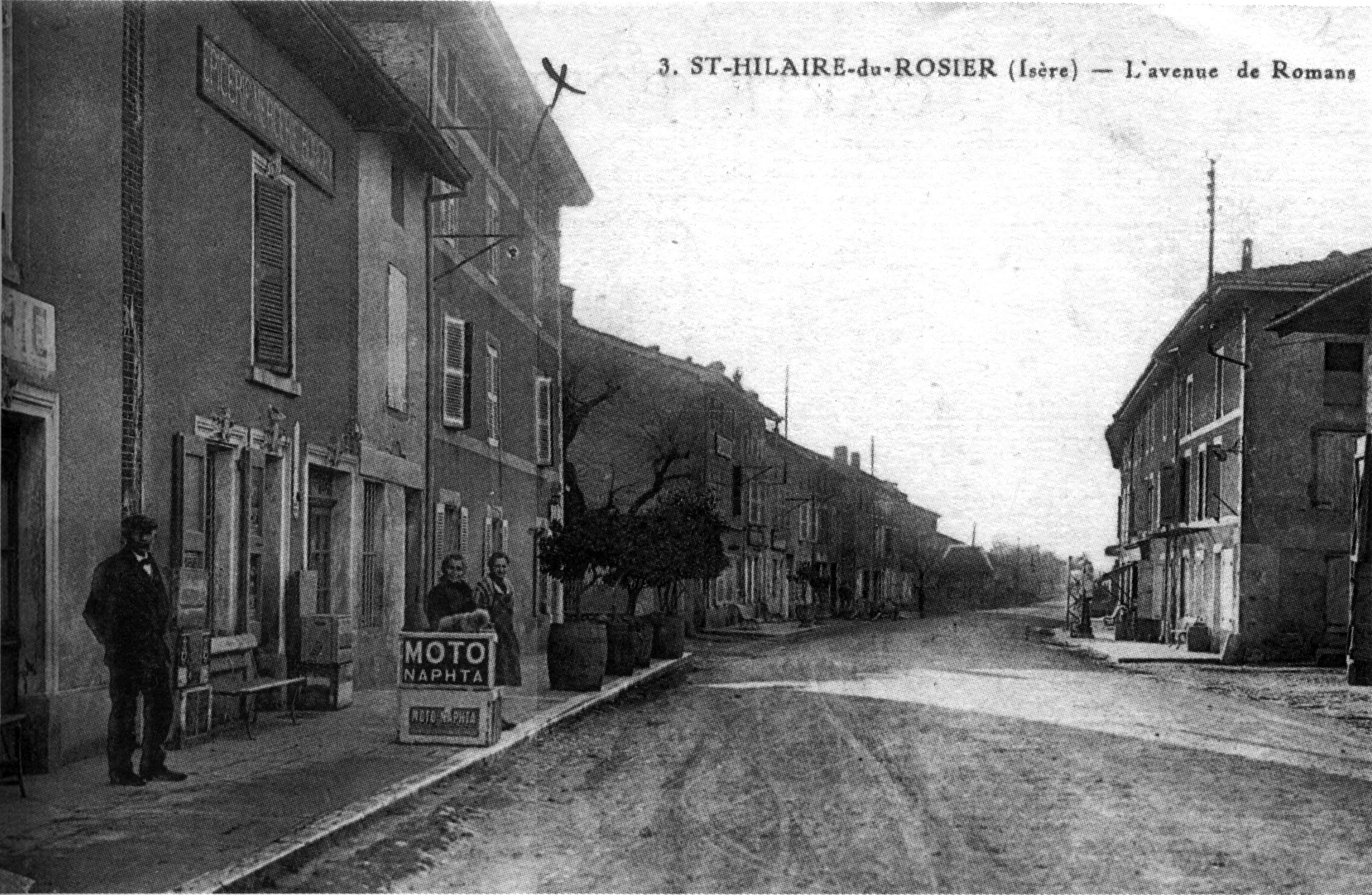
- Saint-Hilaire-du-Rosier around 1930
- Location of Saint-Hilaire-du-Rosier
- Location within France Location within Auvergne-Rhône-Alpes
- Coordinates: 45°05′55″N 5°15′06″E
- Country: France
- Region: Auvergne-Rhône-Alpes
- Department: Isère
- Arrondissement: Grenoble
- Canton: Le Sud Grésivaudan
- Intercommunality: Saint-Marcellin Vercors Isère

Government
  - Mayor (2020–2026): Sylvain Belle
- Area^{1}: 16.42 km^{2} (6.34 sq mi)
- Highest elevation: 280 m (920 ft)
- Lowest elevation: 151 m (495 ft)
- Population (2023): 2,004
  - Density: 122.0/km^{2} (316.1/sq mi)
- Time zone: UTC+01:00 (CET)
  - Summer (DST): UTC+02:00 (CEST)
- INSEE/Postal code: 38394 /38840
- ^{1} French Land Register data, which excludes lakes, ponds, glaciers > 1 km^{2} (0.386 sq mi or 247 acres) and river estuaries.

Saint-Hilaire-du-Rosier (French pronunciation: [sɛ̃.t‿ilˈɛʁ dy ʁozjˈe]) is a commune in the Isère department in southeastern France.

== Population ==
Historical population
Year	Pop.	±% p.a.
1968	1,279	—
1975	1,324	+0.50%
1982	1,559	+2.36%
1990	1,731	+1.32%
1999	1,760	+0.18%
2007	1,857	+0.67%
2012	1,954	+1.02%
2017	1,886	−0.71%
2023	2,004	+1.02%
Source: INSEE

== See also ==
- Communes of the Isère department
