= Aimé Charles Irvoy =

French sculptor (1824–1898)

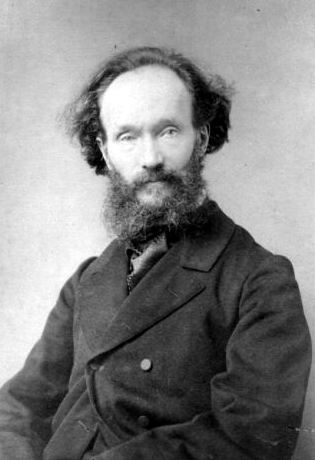
Aimé Charles Irvoy

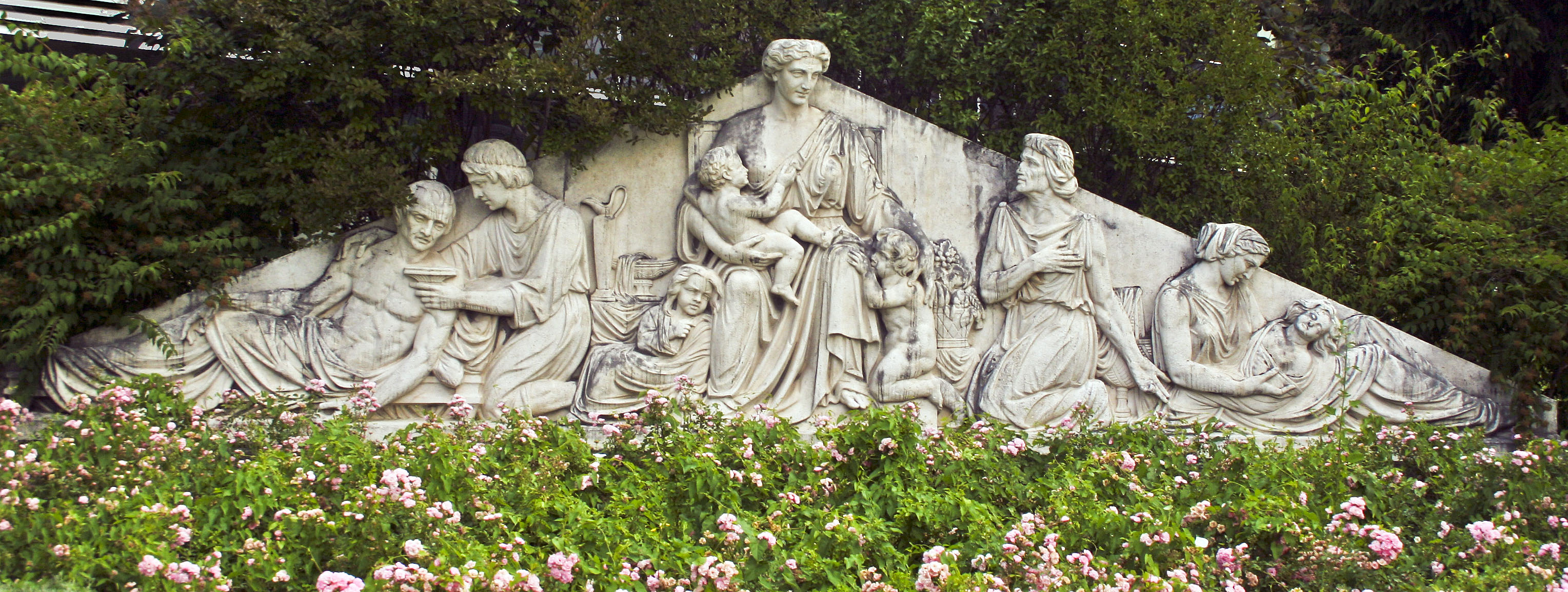
Pediment of the old hospital of Grenoble

Aimé Charles Irvoy (25 November 1824 in Vendôme, Loir-et-Cher – 28 March 1898 in Grenoble, Isère) was a French sculptor who lived and worked in Grenoble.

He was the pupil of Étienne-Jules Ramey, Auguste Dumont and Victor Sappey. In 1854, he won the second Grand prix de Rome. In 1856, as the post of school director of architectural sculpture in Grenoble was vacant, he obtained this position and kept it for forty-one years. The old school (1853) and its director's house, located rue Hébert, now house the musée de la résistance et de la déportation de l'Isère, in Grenoble. In 1861, he married Louise Charrut (1832–1914).

His works are mainly kept in the Museum of Grenoble and the Musée des beaux-arts de Lyon.

He is buried at Saint Roch Cemetery.

== Main works ==
- Statue of Ronsard, bronze, Vendôme
- La Sentinelle gauloise, 1878, Grenoble
- L'allégorie de la charité, pediment of the old civil hospital of Grenoble, rue Félix-Viallet, decommissioned in 1913. It remained in place, hidden under the plaster, the building then housing the Majestic Hotel, until 1944. The pediment is now exposed in the vicinity of the Musée grenoblois des sciences médicales.
