= Aoste, Isère =

Aoste
- Commune
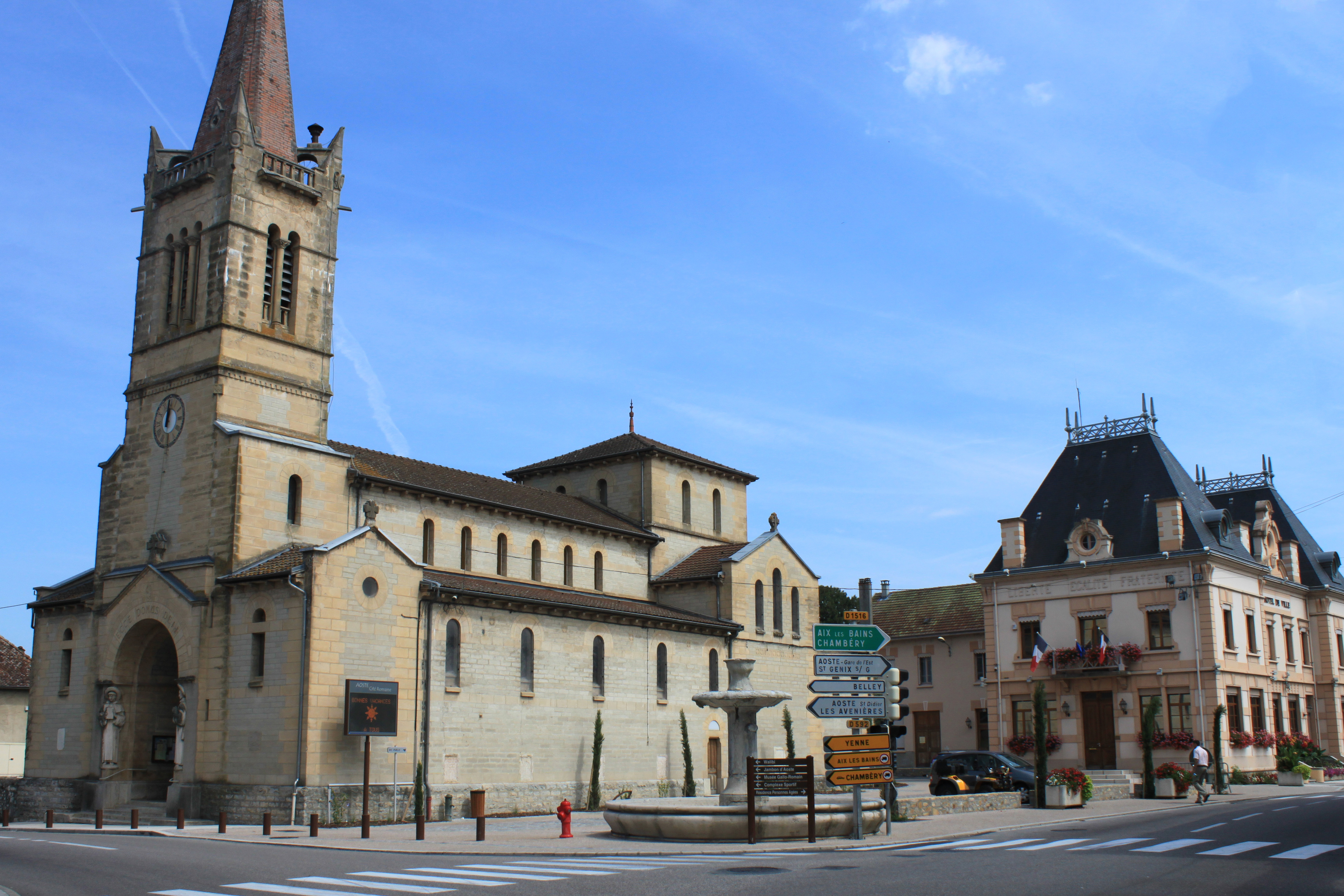
- Centre of Aoste: The church and the Town Hall
- Location of Aoste
- Location within France Location within Auvergne-Rhône-Alpes
- Coordinates: 45°35′20″N 5°36′32″E
- Country: France
- Region: Auvergne-Rhône-Alpes
- Department: Isère
- Arrondissement: La Tour-du-Pin
- Canton: Chartreuse-Guiers

Government
  - Mayor (2020–2026): Roger Marcel
- Area^{1}: 9.82 km^{2} (3.79 sq mi)
- Elevation: 226 m (741 ft)
- Highest elevation: 256 m (840 ft)
- Lowest elevation: 207 m (679 ft)
- Population (2023): 2,876
  - Density: 293/km^{2} (759/sq mi)
- Time zone: UTC+01:00 (CET)
  - Summer (DST): UTC+02:00 (CEST)
- INSEE/Postal code: 38012 /38490
- ^{1} French Land Register data, which excludes lakes, ponds, glaciers > 1 km^{2} (0.386 sq mi or 247 acres) and river estuaries.

Aoste (French pronunciation: [aɔst]; Arpitan: Aoûta) is a commune in the Isère department in the Auvergne-Rhône-Alpes region of southeastern France.

== Geography ==
Aoste is located some 15 km east of La Tour-du-Pin and 8 km north-east of Les Abrets. Access is by the D1516 road from La Batie-Montgascon in the west passing through the village and continuing north-east to Champagneux. The D82F also runs off this road just west of the village and goes north-west to Corbelin. The D40 road from Les Avenieres in the north passes down the eastern side of the commune and continues to Romagnieu. The D592 branches off the D40 on the northern border and goes south to the village continuing to Chimilin in the south. Apart from the village there are also the hamlets of Saint-Didier in the north at the intersection of the D592 and the D40, and Les Champagnes in the east which is really an extension of the urban area of Saint-Genix-sur-Guiers across the border. The rest of the commune is entirely farmland except for the large industrial complex of Jambon d'Aoste north of the village.

The eastern border of the commune is formed by the Guiers river which flows north to join the Rhône which forms the north-eastern border of the commune. The Rhône is the border between Isère and Ain departments while the Guiers is the border between Isère and Savoie departments. The Bièvre river also flows through the west of the commune from the south forming the northern border before joining the Rhone. Numerous other small waterways join the Bièvre.

== History ==
Aoste was a vicus at a crossroad of Roman roads to Italy, to Germania, and to the Roman colonies of Lugdunum and Vienna. Its name appears on the Tabula Peutingeriana as Augustum.

In 2006 archaeological excavations unearthed a pottery workshop dating from the late Middle Ages.

== Administration ==
List of Successive Mayors

Mayors from the French Revolution to 1935

From	To	Name
1789	1790	Antoine Roche
1790	1792	Joseph Billiard
1792	1797	Joseph Comte
1797	1799	André Servoz
1799	1835	Pierre Pillion
1835	1844	Claude Meraud
1844	1848	Louis Chevalier
1848	1853	Guillaume-Alfred de Laforest-Divonne
1853	1855	Louis Chevalier
1855	1870	Guillaume-Alfred de Laforest-Divonne
1870	1876	Prosper Comte
1876	1878	Guillaume-Alfred de Laforest-Divonne
1878	1888	Louis Bovier-Lapierre
1888	1895	Charles Darragon
1895	1904	Augustin Blanc-Jolicoeur
1904	1935	Daniel Blanc-Jolicoeur

Mayors from 1935

From	To	Name
1935	1943	Joseph Guetat
1943	1944	Georges Masset
1944	1947	Pierre Fege
1947	1977	Daniel Joseph Blanc-Jolicoeur
1977	1983	Aimé Burtin
1983	1991	Jacques Perrod
1991	2002	Jean-Michel Ruynat
2002	2014	Raymond Bertrand
2014	2026	Roger Marcel

== Demography ==
The inhabitants of the commune are known as Aostiens or Aostiennes, alternatively Dutards or Dutardes in French.

Historical population

Year	Pop.	±% p.a.
1793	1,393	—
1800	1,464	+0.71%
1806	1,680	+2.32%
1821	1,766	+0.33%
1831	1,153	−4.17%
1836	1,152	−0.02%
1841	1,147	−0.09%
1846	1,100	−0.83%
1851	1,222	+2.13%
1856	1,237	+0.24%
1861	1,129	−1.81%
1866	1,130	+0.02%
1872	1,123	−0.10%
1876	1,166	+0.94%
1881	1,217	+0.86%
1886	1,242	+0.41%
1891	1,200	−0.69%
1896	1,203	+0.05%
1901	1,298	+1.53%

Year	Pop.	±% p.a.
1906	1,216	−1.30%
1911	1,163	−0.89%
1921	1,027	−1.24%
1926	1,101	+1.40%
1931	1,118	+0.31%
1936	1,125	+0.12%
1946	1,108	−0.15%
1954	1,159	+0.56%
1962	1,182	+0.25%
1968	1,248	+0.91%
1975	1,328	+0.89%
1982	1,537	+2.11%
1990	1,548	+0.09%
1999	1,715	+1.14%
2007	2,152	+2.88%
2012	2,767	+5.16%
2017	2,878	+0.79%
2023	2,876	−0.01%

Source: EHESS and INSEE

== Economy ==
=== Jambon Aoste ===
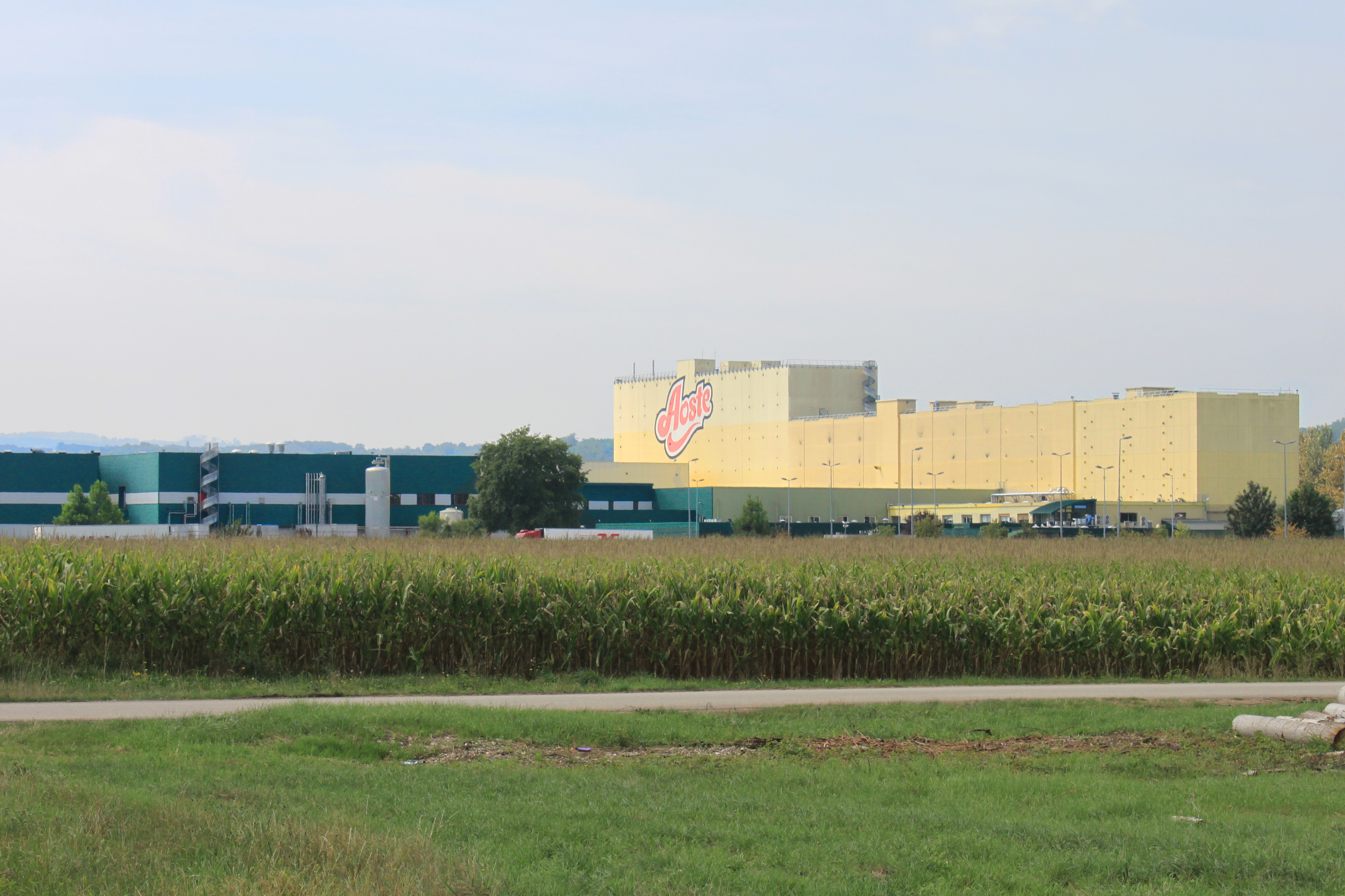
The Aoste Ham Factory

The pork products produced in Isère department and especially the Jambon Aoste (Aoste Ham) are manufactured exclusively in this Groupe Aoste factory which was owned by the industrial group Sara Lee Corporation who ceased their activities in deli products and resold the operation to the American buyer Smithfield Foods through which it passed to the Chinese group Shuanghui in September 2013.

These industrial products with the "Jambon Aoste" label should not be confused with the official name "Vallée d'Aoste Jambon de Bosses" which is a ham produced in the Aosta Valley (An Italian/French Valley) and which has a protected designation of origin. The Ham products produced in Isère have a simple trademark and no Label Rouge, AOC or PDO regulates its production of cooked or raw ham, unlike the Italian Aosta ham which is a vintage handmade product made in very small quantities.

== Sites and Monuments ==
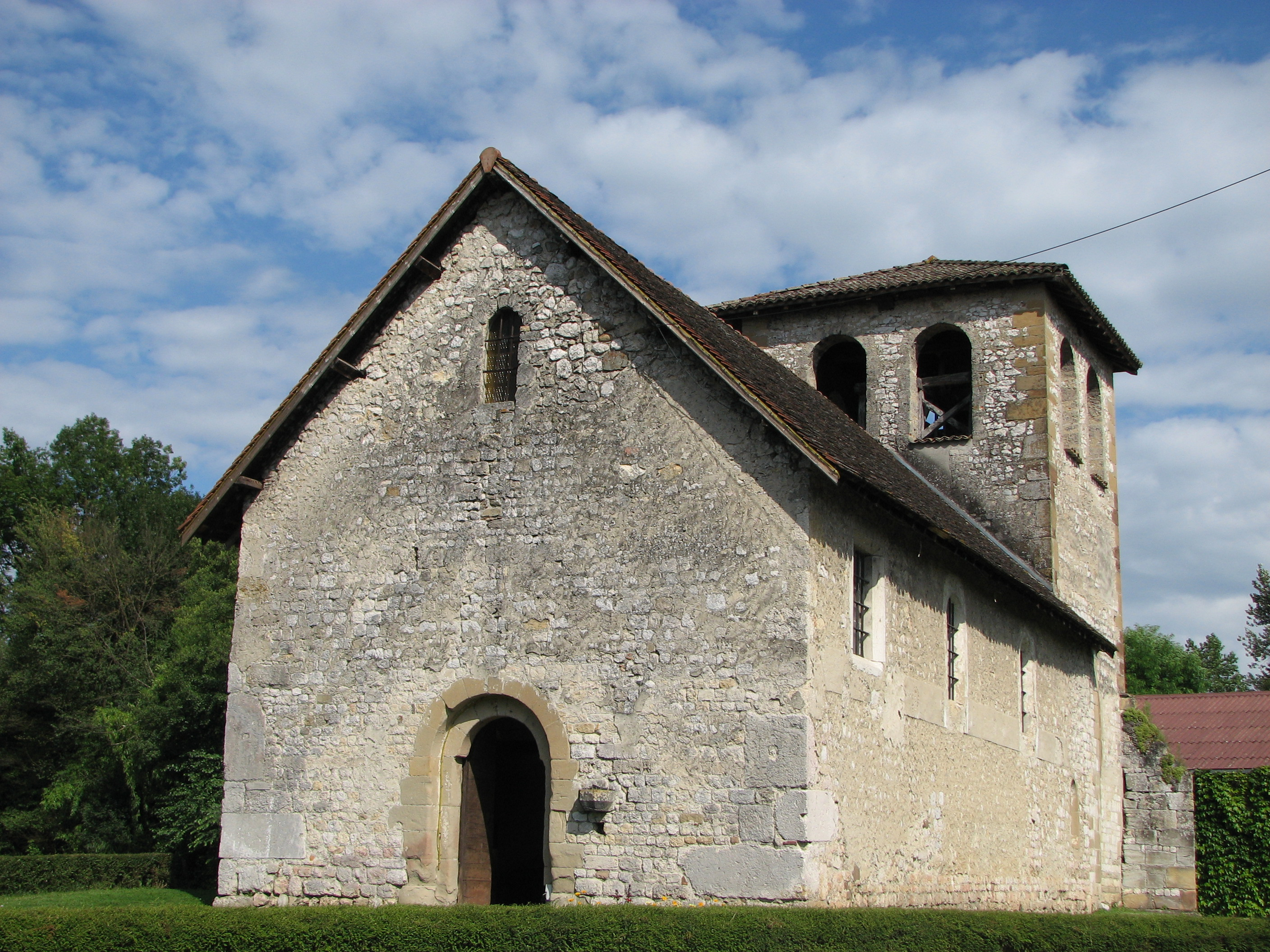
Church of Saint-Didier

- An Ancient Roman settlement with an oven and many relics and an archaeological museum.
- The School contains three items which are registered as historical objects:
  - A Domestic Oratory (Gallo-Roman)
  - An Altar (Gallo-Roman)
  - 2 Commemorative Plaques (Gallo-Roman)
- The Chapel of Saint-Didier contains several items that are registered as historical objects:
  - A Thurible (18th century)
  - A Processional Cross (16th century)
  - 6 ex-voto Commemorative Plaques (Gallo-Roman)
  - 3 Funeral Plaques (Middle Ages)

=== Protected Natural Areas ===
The commune has two natural zones of ecological interest, fauna and flora of type I:

- the alluvial areas of the Rhône du Pont de Groslée à Murs-et-Gélignieux
- the Pools of Paluette

== See also ==
- Communes of the Isère department
