= Château de Siéyès =

Château in Voreppe, Isère, France

Coordinates: 45°17′49″N 5°38′16″E

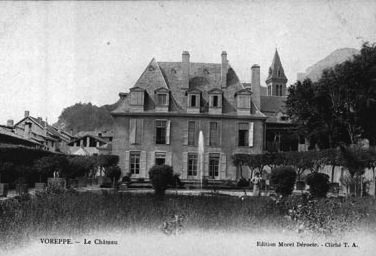
Château de Siéyès

The Château de Siéyès is a château in Voreppe, Isère, France. It was built in the 17th century. It has been listed as an official historical monument since June 6, 1980.
