= Canton of Voiron =

Coordinates: 45.37°N 5.59°E

The canton of Voiron is an administrative division of the Isère department, eastern France. Its borders were modified at the French canton reorganisation which came into effect in March 2015. Its seat is in Voiron.

It consists of the following communes:

1. La Buisse
2. Coublevie
3. La Murette
4. Saint-Aupre
5. Saint-Cassien
6. Saint-Étienne-de-Crossey
7. Saint-Nicolas-de-Macherin
8. La Sure en Chartreuse
9. Voiron
10. Voreppe
