= Canton of Chartreuse-Guiers =

Coordinates: 45.39°N 5.73°E

The canton of Chartreuse-Guiers is an administrative division of the Isère department, eastern France. It was created at the French canton reorganisation which came into effect in March 2015. Its seat is in Saint-Laurent-du-Pont.

It consists of the following communes:

1. Les Abrets-en-Dauphiné
2. Aoste
3. Charancieu
4. Chimilin
5. Entre-deux-Guiers
6. Granieu
7. Merlas
8. Miribel-les-Échelles
9. Le Pont-de-Beauvoisin
10. Pressins
11. Romagnieu
12. Saint-Albin-de-Vaulserre
13. Saint-Bueil
14. Saint-Christophe-sur-Guiers
15. Saint-Geoire-en-Valdaine
16. Saint-Jean-d'Avelanne
17. Saint-Joseph-de-Rivière
18. Saint-Laurent-du-Pont
19. Saint-Martin-de-Vaulserre
20. Saint-Pierre-de-Chartreuse
21. Saint-Pierre-d'Entremont
22. Velanne
23. Voissant
