= Saint-Aupre =

- Commune
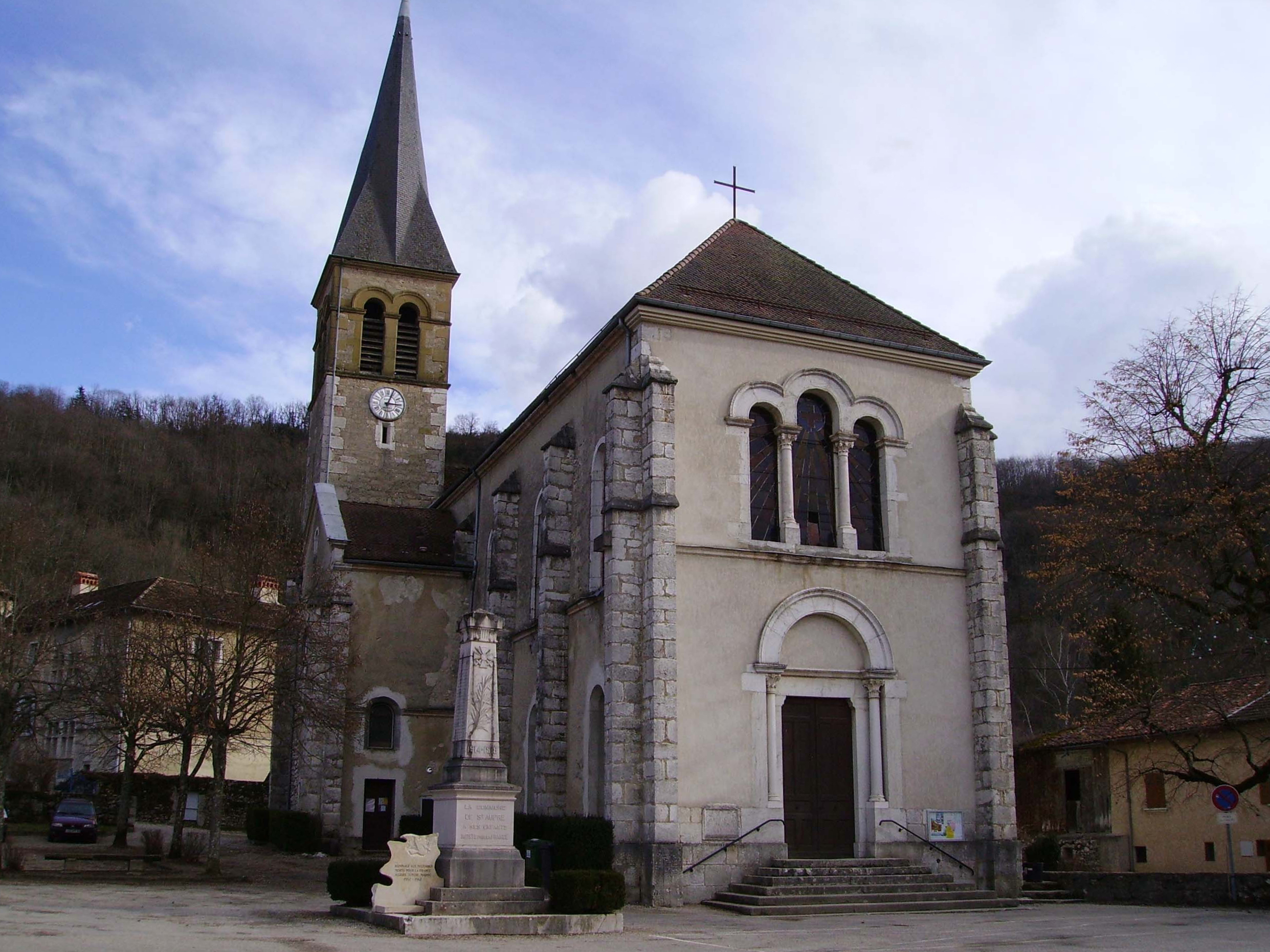
- The church of Saint-Aupre
- Location of Saint-Aupre
- Location within France Location within Auvergne-Rhône-Alpes
- Coordinates: 45°24′01″N 5°40′17″E
- Country: France
- Region: Auvergne-Rhône-Alpes
- Department: Isère
- Arrondissement: Grenoble
- Canton: Voiron
- Intercommunality: CA Pays Voironnais

Government
  - Mayor (2020–2026): Patrick Buisson
- Area^{1}: 11.93 km^{2} (4.61 sq mi)
- Elevation: 450 m (1,480 ft)
- Highest elevation: 925 m (3,035 ft)
- Lowest elevation: 436 m (1,430 ft)
- Population (2023): 1,182
  - Density: 99.08/km^{2} (256.6/sq mi)
- Time zone: UTC+01:00 (CET)
  - Summer (DST): UTC+02:00 (CEST)
- INSEE/Postal code: 38362 /38960
- ^{1} French Land Register data, which excludes lakes, ponds, glaciers > 1 km^{2} (0.386 sq mi or 247 acres) and river estuaries.

Saint-Aupre (French pronunciation: [sɛ̃.t‿opʁ]) is a commune in the Isère department in southeastern France. It is located near the city of Voiron.

== Population ==
Historical population
Year	Pop.	±% p.a.
1968	389	—
1975	388	−0.04%
1982	560	+5.38%
1990	676	+2.38%
1999	872	+2.87%
2007	1,050	+2.35%
2012	1,102	+0.97%
2017	1,137	+0.63%
2023	1,182	+0.65%
Source: INSEE

== See also ==
- Communes of the Isère department
