= Saint-Jean-d'Avelanne =

- Commune
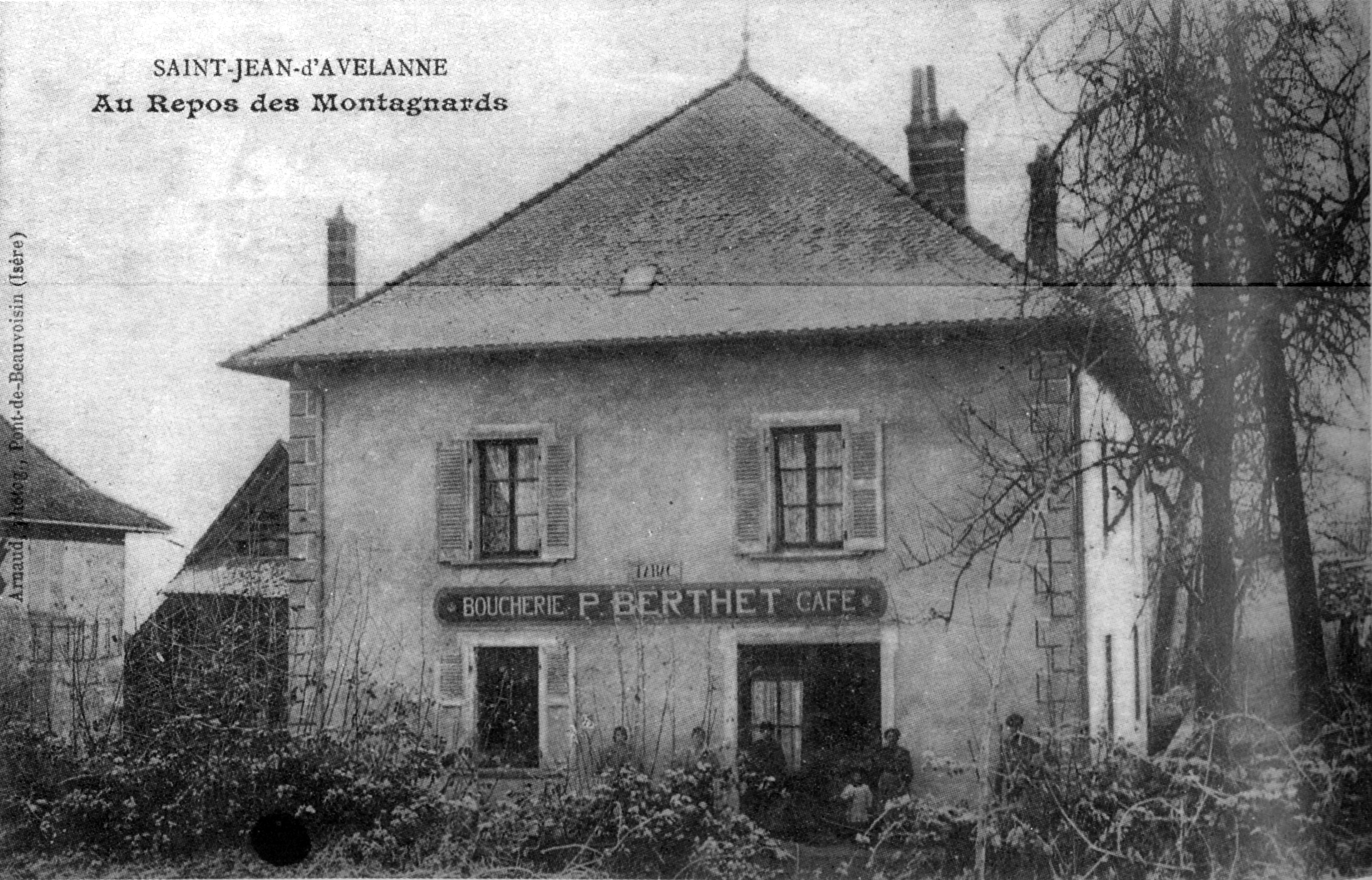
- Saint-Jean-d'Avelanne in 1912
- Location of Saint-Jean-d'Avelanne
- Location within France Location within Auvergne-Rhône-Alpes
- Coordinates: 45°30′28″N 5°40′25″E
- Country: France
- Region: Auvergne-Rhône-Alpes
- Department: Isère
- Arrondissement: La Tour-du-Pin
- Canton: Chartreuse-Guiers

Government
  - Mayor (2020–2026): Jean-François Pillaud-Tirard
- Area^{1}: 7.85 km^{2} (3.03 sq mi)
- Elevation: 300 m (980 ft)
- Highest elevation: 549 m (1,801 ft)
- Lowest elevation: 256 m (840 ft)
- Population (2023): 969
  - Density: 123/km^{2} (320/sq mi)
- Time zone: UTC+01:00 (CET)
  - Summer (DST): UTC+02:00 (CEST)
- INSEE/Postal code: 38398 /38480
- ^{1} French Land Register data, which excludes lakes, ponds, glaciers > 1 km^{2} (0.386 sq mi or 247 acres) and river estuaries.

Saint-Jean-d'Avelanne (French pronunciation: [sɛ̃ ʒɑ̃ davlan]) is a commune in the Isère department in southeastern France.

== Population ==
Historical population
| Year | Pop. | ±% p.a. |
|---|---|---|
| 1968 | 543 | — |
| 1975 | 516 | −0.73% |
| 1982 | 555 | +1.05% |
| 1990 | 609 | +1.17% |
| 1999 | 620 | +0.20% |
| 2007 | 786 | +3.01% |
| 2012 | 925 | +3.31% |
| 2017 | 966 | +0.87% |
| 2023 | 969 | +0.05% |
Source: INSEE

== See also ==
- Communes of the Isère department
