= Saint-Bueil =

- Commune
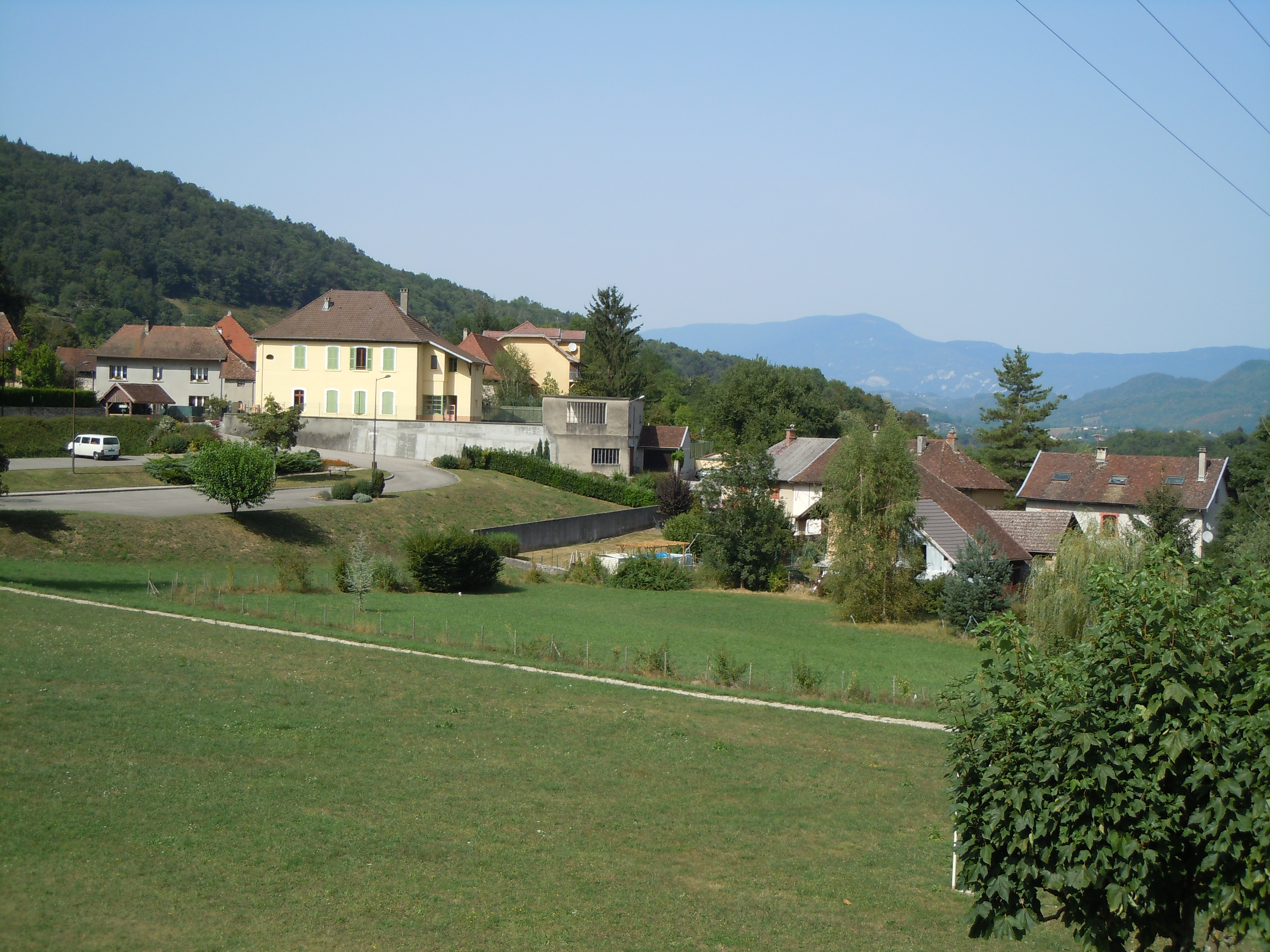
- A general view of Saint-Bueil
- Location of Saint-Bueil
- Location within France Location within Auvergne-Rhône-Alpes
- Coordinates: 45°28′38″N 5°40′59″E
- Country: France
- Region: Auvergne-Rhône-Alpes
- Department: Isère
- Arrondissement: La Tour-du-Pin
- Canton: Chartreuse-Guiers
- Intercommunality: CA Pays Voironnais

Government
  - Mayor (2020–2026): Jean-Pierre Loconte
- Area^{1}: 3.81 km^{2} (1.47 sq mi)
- Elevation: 320 m (1,050 ft)
- Highest elevation: 570 m (1,870 ft)
- Lowest elevation: 293 m (961 ft)
- Population (2023): 716
  - Density: 188/km^{2} (487/sq mi)
- Time zone: UTC+01:00 (CET)
  - Summer (DST): UTC+02:00 (CEST)
- INSEE/Postal code: 38372 /38620
- ^{1} French Land Register data, which excludes lakes, ponds, glaciers > 1 km^{2} (0.386 sq mi or 247 acres) and river estuaries.

Saint-Bueil (French pronunciation: [sɛ̃ bɥɛj]; Arpitan: Sant-Buely) is a commune in the Isère department in southeastern France.

== Population ==
Historical population
Year	Pop.	±% p.a.
1968	534	—
1975	516	−0.49%
1982	585	+1.81%
1990	559	−0.57%
1999	628	+1.30%
2007	697	+1.31%
2012	695	−0.06%
2017	723	+0.79%
2023	716	−0.16%
Source: INSEE

== See also ==
- Communes of the Isère department
