= Saint-Sulpice-des-Rivoires =

- Commune
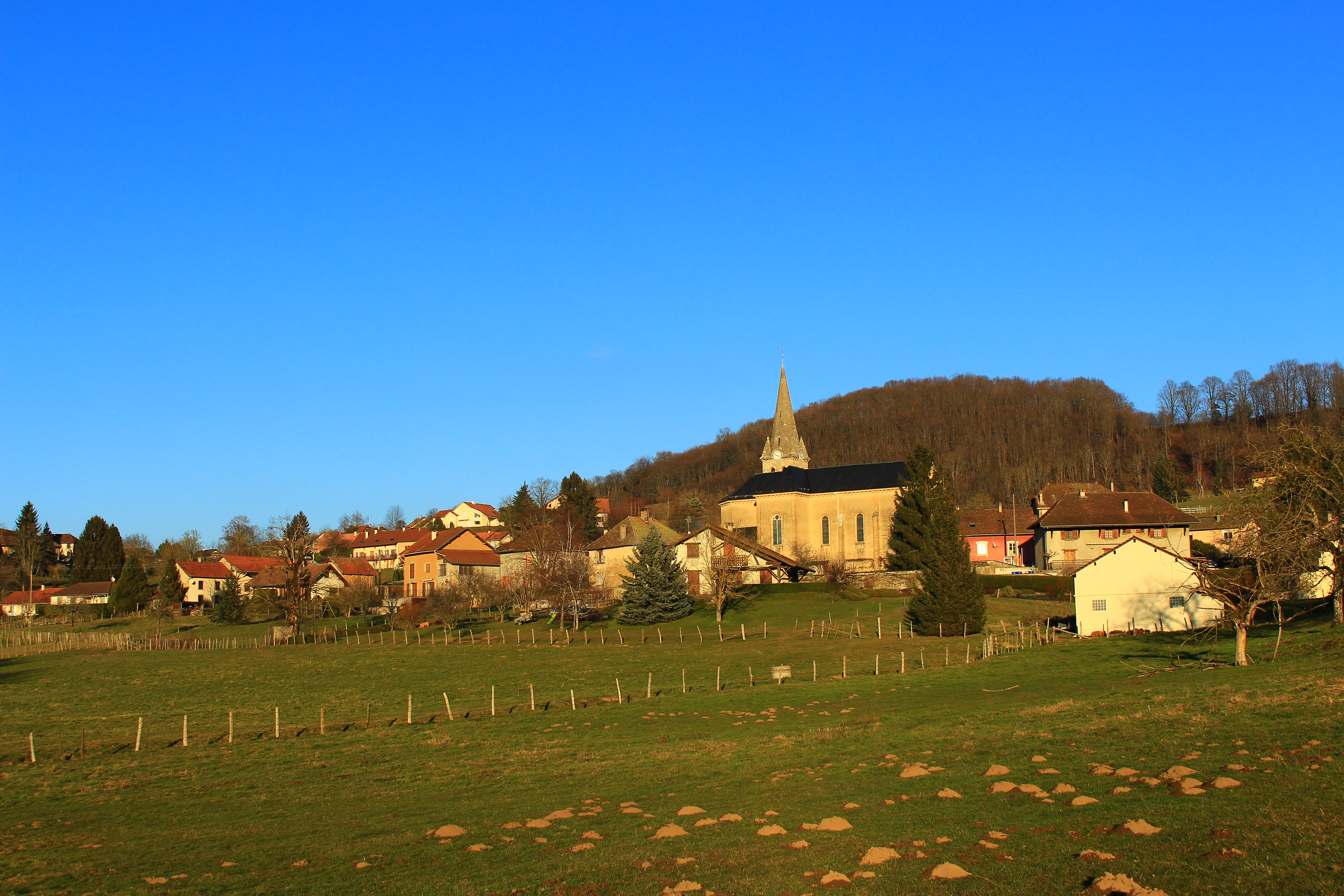
- A general view of Saint-Sulpice-des-Rivoires
- Location of Saint-Sulpice-des-Rivoires
- Location within France Location within Auvergne-Rhône-Alpes
- Coordinates: 45°28′11″N 5°36′37″E
- Country: France
- Region: Auvergne-Rhône-Alpes
- Department: Isère
- Arrondissement: La Tour-du-Pin
- Canton: Le Grand-Lemps
- Intercommunality: CA Pays Voironnais

Government
  - Mayor (2020–2026): Marcel Colombin
- Area^{1}: 7.16 km^{2} (2.76 sq mi)
- Elevation: 500 m (1,600 ft)
- Highest elevation: 780 m (2,560 ft)
- Lowest elevation: 511 m (1,677 ft)
- Population (2023): 425
  - Density: 59.4/km^{2} (154/sq mi)
- Time zone: UTC+01:00 (CET)
  - Summer (DST): UTC+02:00 (CEST)
- INSEE/Postal code: 38460 /38620
- ^{1} French Land Register data, which excludes lakes, ponds, glaciers > 1 km^{2} (0.386 sq mi or 247 acres) and river estuaries.

Saint-Sulpice-des-Rivoires (French pronunciation: [sɛ̃ sylpis de ʁivwaʁ]) is a commune in the Isère department in southeastern France.

== Population ==
Historical population
Year	Pop.	±% p.a.
1968	217	—
1975	222	+0.33%
1982	256	+2.06%
1990	343	+3.72%
1999	411	+2.03%
2007	398	−0.40%
2012	445	+2.26%
2017	430	−0.68%
2023	425	−0.19%
Source: INSEE

== See also ==
- Communes of the Isère department
