= Coublevie =

- Commune
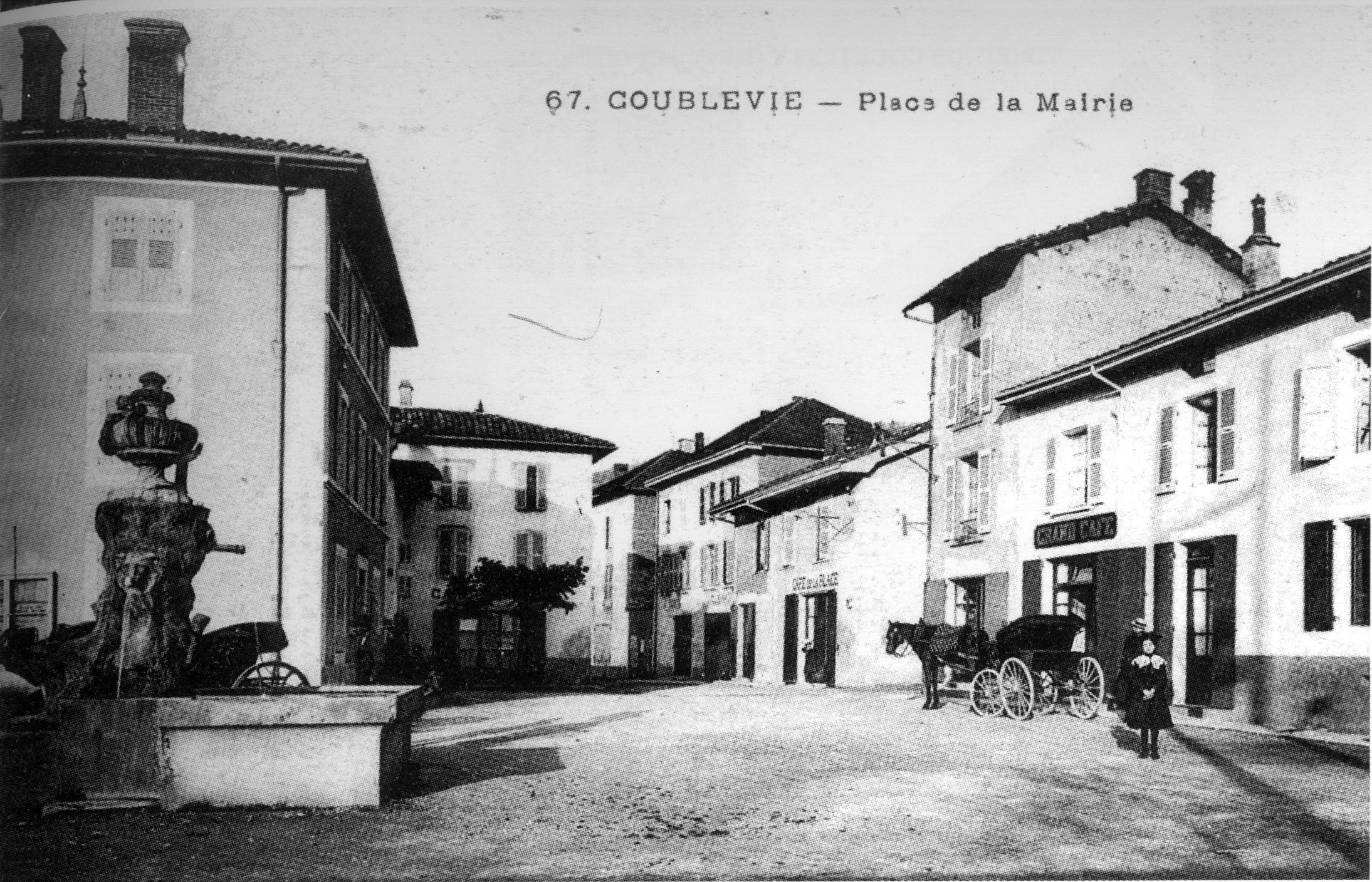
- Coublevie in 1908
- Location of Coublevie
- Location within France Location within Auvergne-Rhône-Alpes
- Coordinates: 45°21′23″N 5°37′03″E
- Country: France
- Region: Auvergne-Rhône-Alpes
- Department: Isère
- Arrondissement: Grenoble
- Canton: Voiron
- Intercommunality: CA Pays Voironnais

Government
  - Mayor (2020–2026): Adrienne Pervès
- Area^{1}: 7.05 km^{2} (2.72 sq mi)
- Highest elevation: 651 m (2,136 ft)
- Lowest elevation: 250 m (820 ft)
- Population (2023): 5,520
  - Density: 783/km^{2} (2,030/sq mi)
- Time zone: UTC+01:00 (CET)
  - Summer (DST): UTC+02:00 (CEST)
- INSEE/Postal code: 38133 /38500
- ^{1} French Land Register data, which excludes lakes, ponds, glaciers > 1 km^{2} (0.386 sq mi or 247 acres) and river estuaries.

Coublevie (French pronunciation: [kubləvi]) is a commune in the Isère department in southeastern France.

== Population ==
Historical population

Year	Pop.	±% p.a.
1793	1,429	—
1800	1,650	+2.08%
1806	1,776	+1.23%
1821	2,013	+0.84%
1831	1,517	−2.79%
1836	1,537	+0.26%
1841	1,454	−1.10%
1846	1,429	−0.35%
1851	1,370	−0.84%
1856	1,346	−0.35%
1861	1,335	−0.16%
1866	1,319	−0.24%
1872	1,390	+0.88%
1876	1,454	+1.13%
1881	1,593	+1.84%
1886	1,612	+0.24%
1891	1,558	−0.68%
1896	1,552	−0.08%
1901	1,584	+0.41%

Year	Pop.	±% p.a.
1906	1,522	−0.80%
1911	1,455	−0.90%
1921	1,492	+0.25%
1926	1,640	+1.91%
1931	1,683	+0.52%
1936	1,602	−0.98%
1946	1,728	+0.76%
1954	1,844	+0.82%
1962	2,080	+1.52%
1968	2,461	+2.84%
1975	2,835	+2.04%
1982	3,100	+1.28%
1990	3,335	+0.92%
1999	3,743	+1.29%
2007	4,166	+1.35%
2012	4,445	+1.30%
2017	4,836	+1.70%
2023	5,520	+2.23%

Source: EHESS and INSEE (1968-2023)

== See also ==
- Communes of the Isère department
