= Velanne =

- Commune
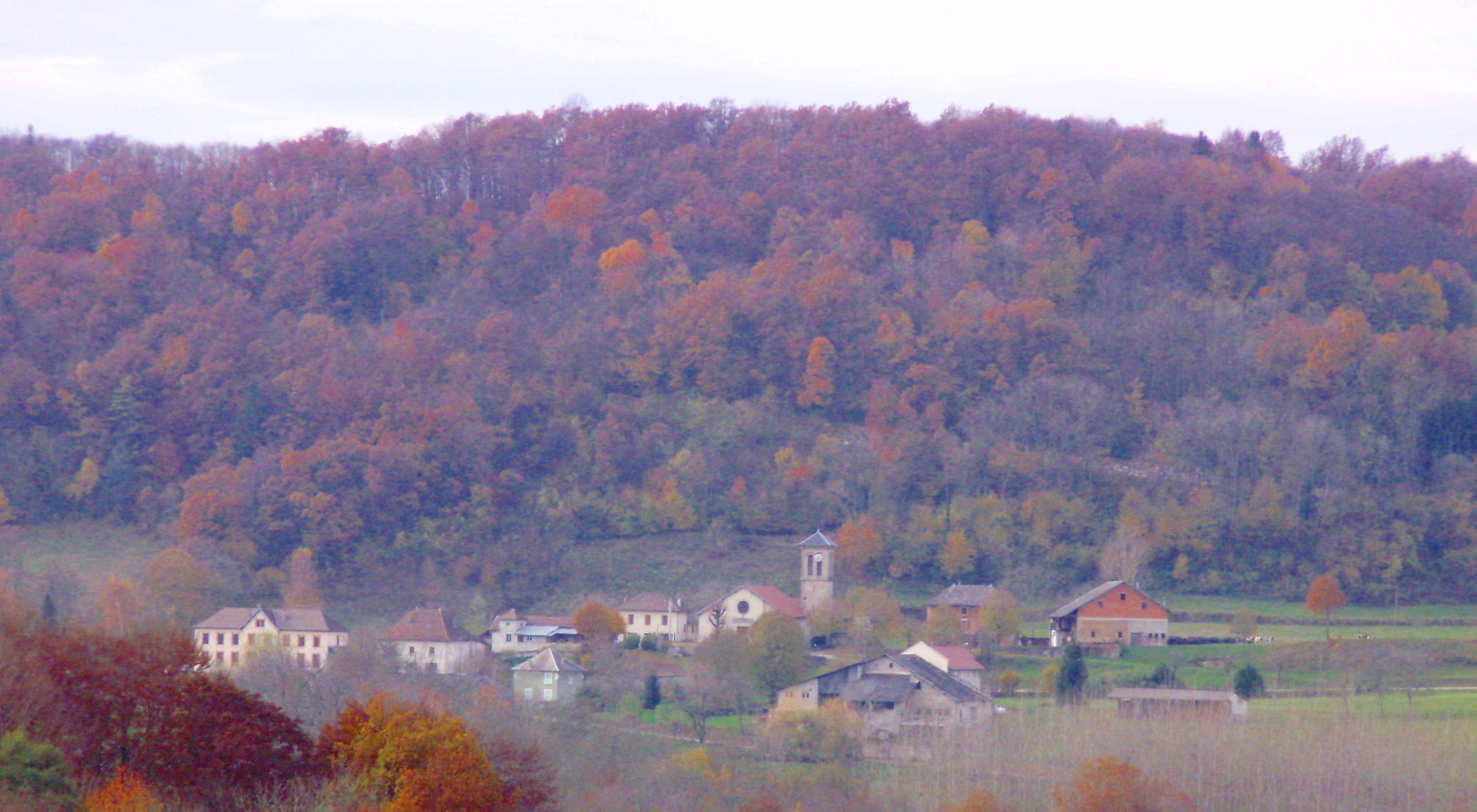
- A general view of Velanne
- Location of Velanne
- Location within France Location within Auvergne-Rhône-Alpes
- Coordinates: 45°29′22″N 5°38′55″E
- Country: France
- Region: Auvergne-Rhône-Alpes
- Department: Isère
- Arrondissement: La Tour-du-Pin
- Canton: Chartreuse-Guiers
- Intercommunality: CA Pays Voironnais

Government
  - Mayor (2020–2026): Denis Mollière
- Area^{1}: 7.98 km^{2} (3.08 sq mi)
- Highest elevation: 641 m (2,103 ft)
- Lowest elevation: 509 m (1,670 ft)
- Population (2023): 572
  - Density: 71.7/km^{2} (186/sq mi)
- Demonym: Velannois
- Time zone: UTC+01:00 (CET)
  - Summer (DST): UTC+02:00 (CEST)
- INSEE/Postal code: 38531 /38620
- ^{1} French Land Register data, which excludes lakes, ponds, glaciers > 1 km^{2} (0.386 sq mi or 247 acres) and river estuaries.

Velanne (French pronunciation: [vəlan]) is a commune in the Isère department in southeastern France.

== Population ==
Historical population
Year	Pop.	±% p.a.
1968	270	—
1975	244	−1.44%
1982	287	+2.35%
1990	383	+3.67%
1999	414	+0.87%
2007	470	+1.60%
2012	506	+1.49%
2017	537	+1.20%
2023	572	+1.06%
Source: INSEE

== See also ==
- Communes of the Isère department
