= Saint-Cassien, Isère =

Saint-Cassien
- Commune
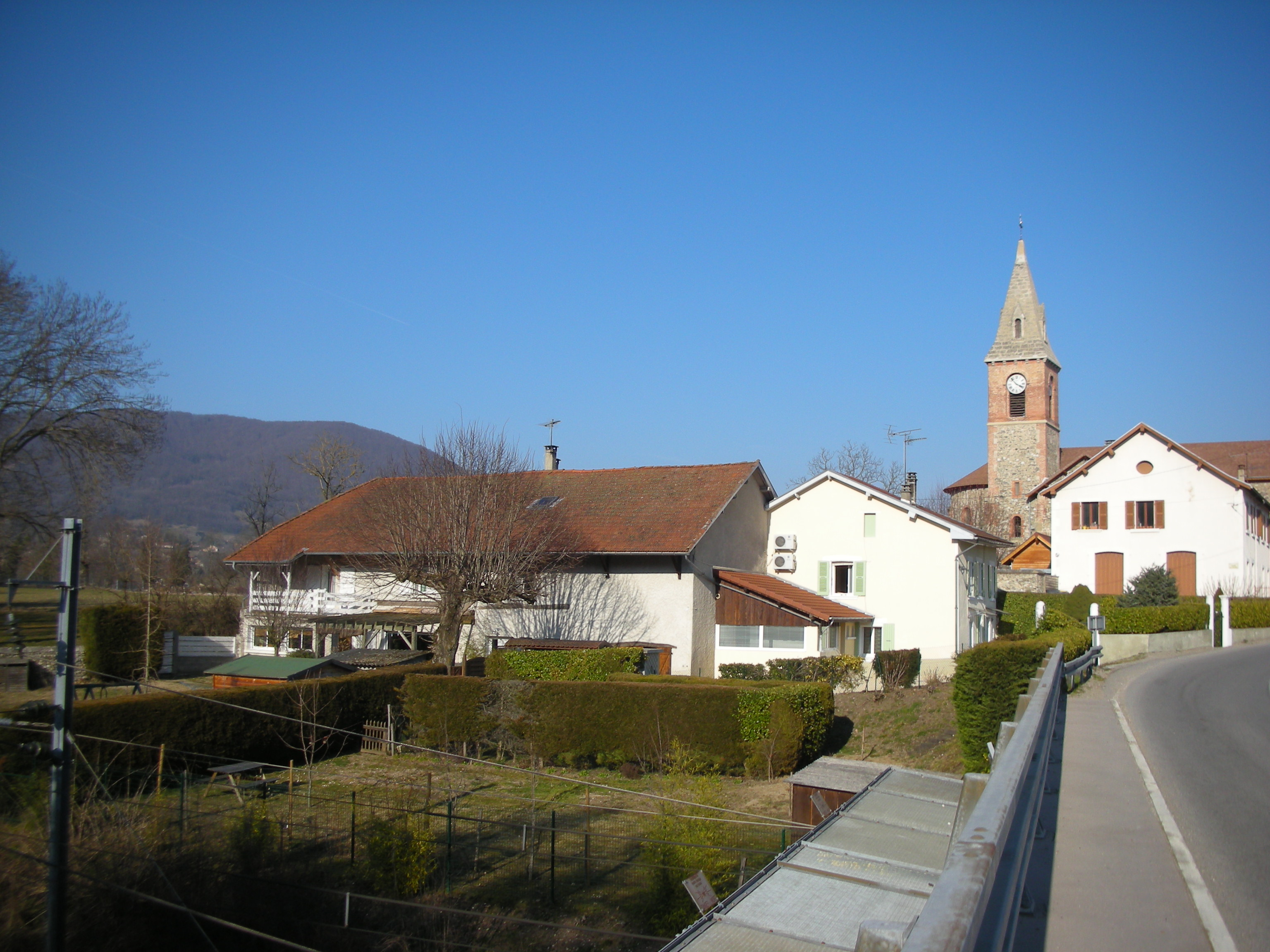
- The centre of the village
- Location of Saint-Cassien
- Location within France Location within Auvergne-Rhône-Alpes
- Coordinates: 45°21′39″N 5°33′15″E
- Country: France
- Region: Auvergne-Rhône-Alpes
- Department: Isère
- Arrondissement: Grenoble
- Canton: Voiron
- Intercommunality: CA Pays Voironnais

Government
  - Mayor (2024–2026): Laurent Ailloud
- Area^{1}: 5.67 km^{2} (2.19 sq mi)
- Elevation: 360 m (1,180 ft)
- Highest elevation: 424 m (1,391 ft)
- Lowest elevation: 307 m (1,007 ft)
- Population (2023): 1,154
  - Density: 204/km^{2} (527/sq mi)
- Time zone: UTC+01:00 (CET)
  - Summer (DST): UTC+02:00 (CEST)
- INSEE/Postal code: 38373 /38500
- ^{1} French Land Register data, which excludes lakes, ponds, glaciers > 1 km^{2} (0.386 sq mi or 247 acres) and river estuaries.

Saint-Cassien (French pronunciation: [sɛ̃ kasjˈɛ̃]) is a commune in the Isère department in southeastern France.

== Population ==
Historical population
Year	Pop.	±% p.a.
1968	491	—
1975	608	+3.10%
1982	767	+3.37%
1990	861	+1.46%
1999	960	+1.22%
2007	1,056	+1.20%
2012	1,155	+1.81%
2017	1,162	+0.12%
2023	1,154	−0.12%
Source: INSEE

== See also ==
- Communes of the Isère department
