= Communauté d'agglomération du Pays Voironnais =

Coordinates: 45°20′N 5°35′E

Pays Voironnais
- Communauté d'agglomération
- Country: France
- Region: Auvergne-Rhône-Alpes
- Department: Isère
- No. of communes: {{{nbcomm}}}
- Established: 2000
- Area: 367.3 km^{2} (141.8 sq mi)
- Population (2018): 93,573
  - Density: 254.8/km^{2} (659.8/sq mi)

The Communauté d'agglomération du Pays Voironnais is the communauté d'agglomération, an intercommunal structure, centred on the town of Voiron. It is located in the Isère department, in the Auvergne-Rhône-Alpes region, eastern France. It was created in 2000. Its area is 367.3 km^{2}. Its population was 93,573 in 2018, of which 20,248 in Voiron proper.

== Composition ==
The communauté d'agglomération consists of the following 31 communes:

1. Bilieu
2. La Buisse
3. Charancieu
4. Charavines
5. Charnècles
6. Chirens
7. Coublevie
8. Massieu
9. Merlas
10. Moirans
11. Montferrat
12. La Murette
13. Réaumont
14. Rives
15. Saint-Aupre
16. Saint-Blaise-du-Buis
17. Saint-Bueil
18. Saint-Cassien
19. Saint-Étienne-de-Crossey
20. Saint-Geoire-en-Valdaine
21. Saint-Jean-de-Moirans
22. Saint-Nicolas-de-Macherin
23. Saint-Sulpice-des-Rivoires
24. La Sure en Chartreuse
25. Tullins
26. Velanne
27. Villages du Lac de Paladru
28. Voiron
29. Voissant
30. Voreppe
31. Vourey
