= Granieu =

- Commune
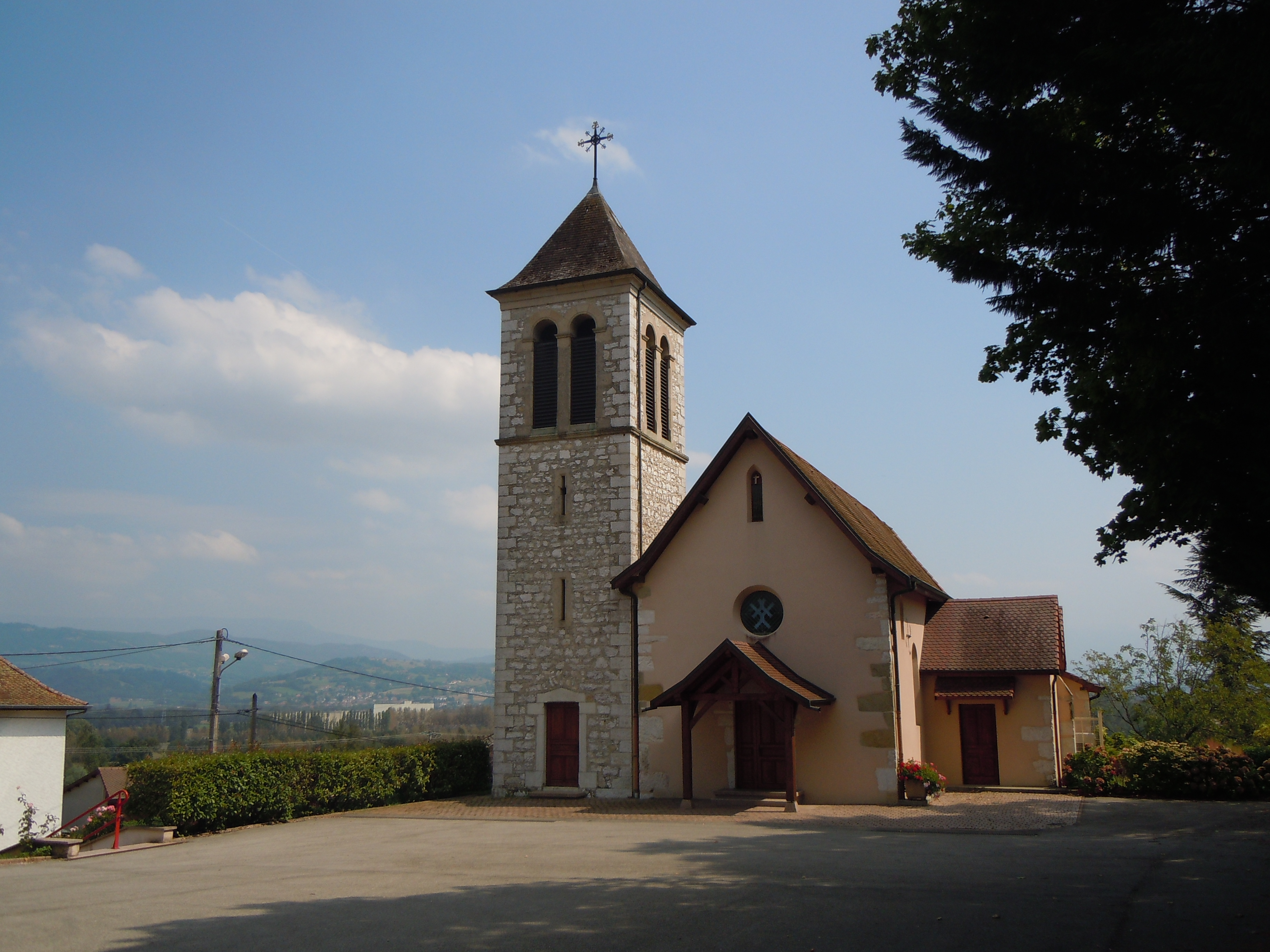
- The church of Granieu
- Location of Granieu
- Location within France Location within Auvergne-Rhône-Alpes
- Coordinates: 45°36′01″N 5°35′22″E
- Country: France
- Region: Auvergne-Rhône-Alpes
- Department: Isère
- Arrondissement: La Tour-du-Pin
- Canton: Chartreuse-Guiers

Government
  - Mayor (2023–2026): Chantal Huguet
- Area^{1}: 3.73 km^{2} (1.44 sq mi)
- Highest elevation: 311 m (1,020 ft)
- Lowest elevation: 214 m (702 ft)
- Population (2023): 519
  - Density: 139/km^{2} (360/sq mi)
- Time zone: UTC+01:00 (CET)
  - Summer (DST): UTC+02:00 (CEST)
- INSEE/Postal code: 38183 /38490
- ^{1} French Land Register data, which excludes lakes, ponds, glaciers > 1 km^{2} (0.386 sq mi or 247 acres) and river estuaries.

Granieu (French pronunciation: [ɡʁanjø]) is a commune in the Isère department in southeastern France.

== Population ==
Historical population
Year	Pop.	±% p.a.
1968	187	—
1975	195	+0.60%
1982	236	+2.76%
1990	248	+0.62%
1999	258	+0.44%
2007	398	+5.57%
2012	461	+2.98%
2017	501	+1.68%
2023	519	+0.59%
Source: INSEE

== See also ==
- Communes of the Isère department
