= Saint-Étienne-de-Crossey =

- Commune
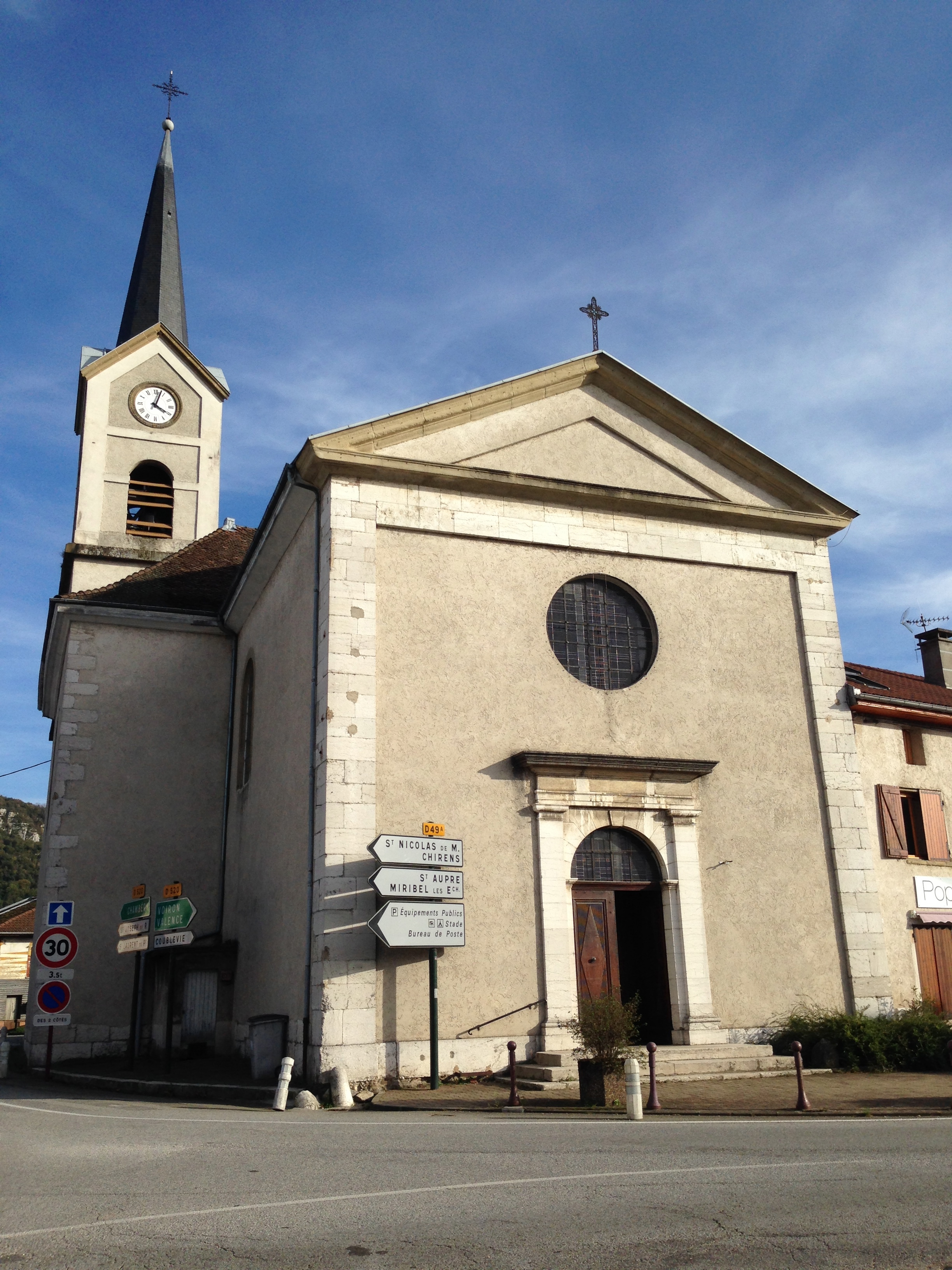
- The church of Saint-Étienne-de-Crossey
- Location of Saint-Étienne-de-Crossey
- Location within France Location within Auvergne-Rhône-Alpes
- Coordinates: 45°22′48″N 5°38′46″E
- Country: France
- Region: Auvergne-Rhône-Alpes
- Department: Isère
- Arrondissement: Grenoble
- Canton: Voiron
- Intercommunality: CA Pays Voironnais

Government
  - Mayor (2020–2026): Ghislaine Peylin
- Area^{1}: 12.84 km^{2} (4.96 sq mi)
- Elevation: 451 m (1,480 ft)
- Highest elevation: 883 m (2,897 ft)
- Lowest elevation: 370 m (1,210 ft)
- Population (2023): 2,619
  - Density: 204.0/km^{2} (528.3/sq mi)
- Time zone: UTC+01:00 (CET)
  - Summer (DST): UTC+02:00 (CEST)
- INSEE/Postal code: 38383 /38960
- ^{1} French Land Register data, which excludes lakes, ponds, glaciers > 1 km^{2} (0.386 sq mi or 247 acres) and river estuaries.

Saint-Étienne-de-Crossey (French pronunciation: [sɛ̃.t‿etjɛn də kʁɔsɛ]) is a commune in the Isère department in southeastern France.

== Population ==
Historical population

Year	Pop.	±% p.a.
1793	1,337	—
1821	1,320	−0.05%
1846	1,695	+1.01%
1872	1,363	−0.83%
1901	1,137	−0.62%
1926	913	−0.87%
1946	816	−0.56%
1962	747	−0.55%
1968	808	+1.32%

Year	Pop.	±% p.a.
1975	1,054	+3.87%
1982	1,774	+7.72%
1990	2,081	+2.02%
1999	2,478	+1.96%
2007	2,528	+0.25%
2012	2,572	+0.35%
2017	2,542	−0.23%
2023	2,619	+0.50%

Source: EHESS and INSEE (1968-2023)

== See also ==
- Communes of the Isère department
