= Pressins =

- Commune
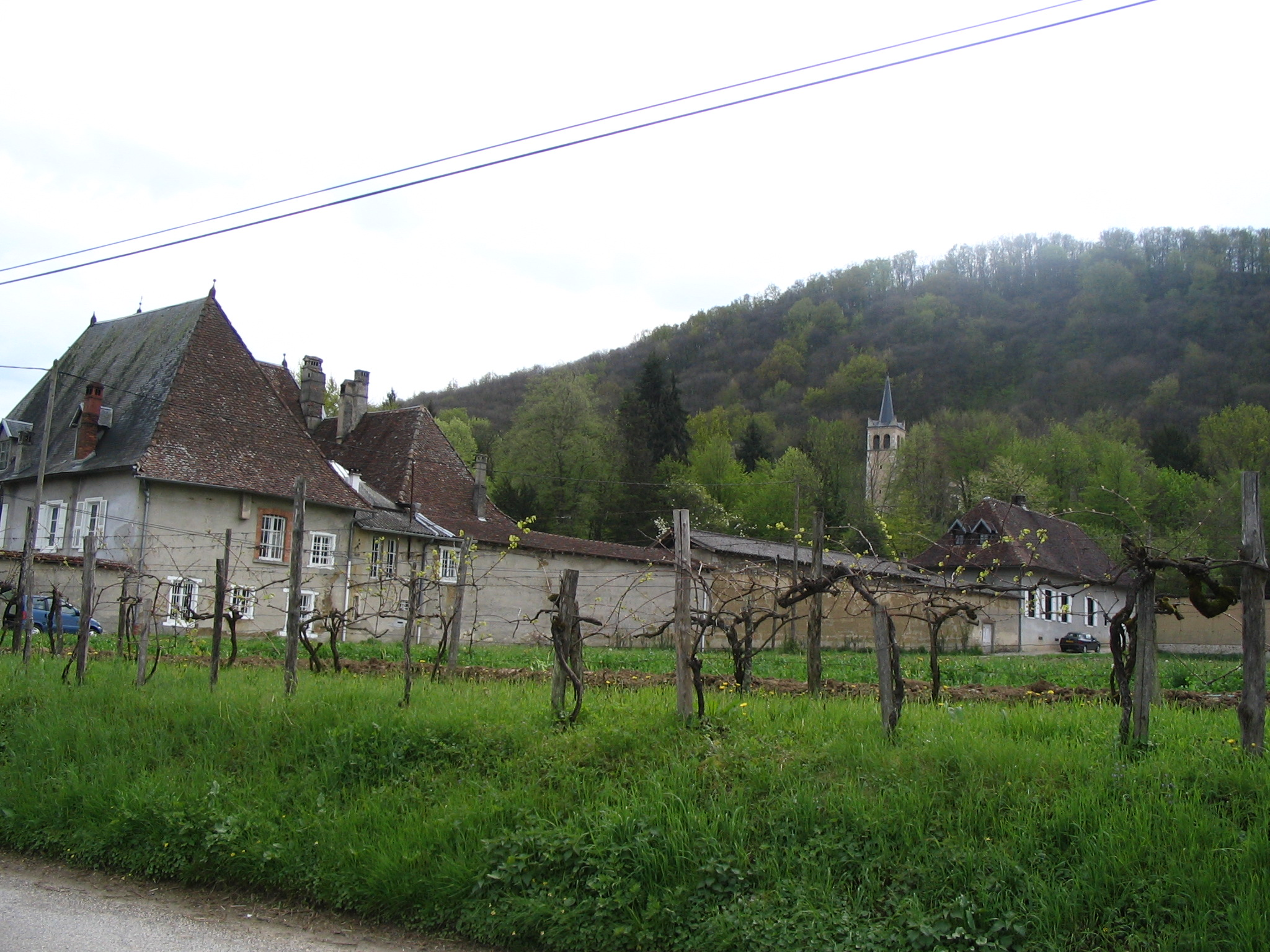
- A general view of Pressins

- Coat of arms
- Location of Pressins
- Location within France Location within Auvergne-Rhône-Alpes
- Coordinates: 45°31′35″N 5°37′40″E
- Country: France
- Region: Auvergne-Rhône-Alpes
- Department: Isère
- Arrondissement: La Tour-du-Pin
- Canton: Chartreuse-Guiers

Government
  - Mayor (2020–2026): Jean-Louis Reynaud
- Area^{1}: 10.1 km^{2} (3.9 sq mi)
- Elevation: 377 m (1,237 ft)
- Highest elevation: 532 m (1,745 ft)
- Lowest elevation: 262 m (860 ft)
- Population (2023): 1,194
  - Density: 118/km^{2} (306/sq mi)
- Time zone: UTC+01:00 (CET)
  - Summer (DST): UTC+02:00 (CEST)
- INSEE/Postal code: 38323 /38480
- ^{1} French Land Register data, which excludes lakes, ponds, glaciers > 1 km^{2} (0.386 sq mi or 247 acres) and river estuaries.

Pressins (French pronunciation: [pʁesɛ̃]) is a commune in the Isère department in southeastern France.

== Population ==
Historical population
Year	Pop.	±% p.a.
1968	568	—
1975	544	−0.61%
1982	687	+3.39%
1990	762	+1.30%
1999	832	+0.98%
2007	1,040	+2.83%
2012	1,130	+1.67%
2017	1,156	+0.46%
2023	1,194	+0.54%
Source: INSEE

== See also ==
- Communes of the Isère department
