= Charancieu =

- Commune
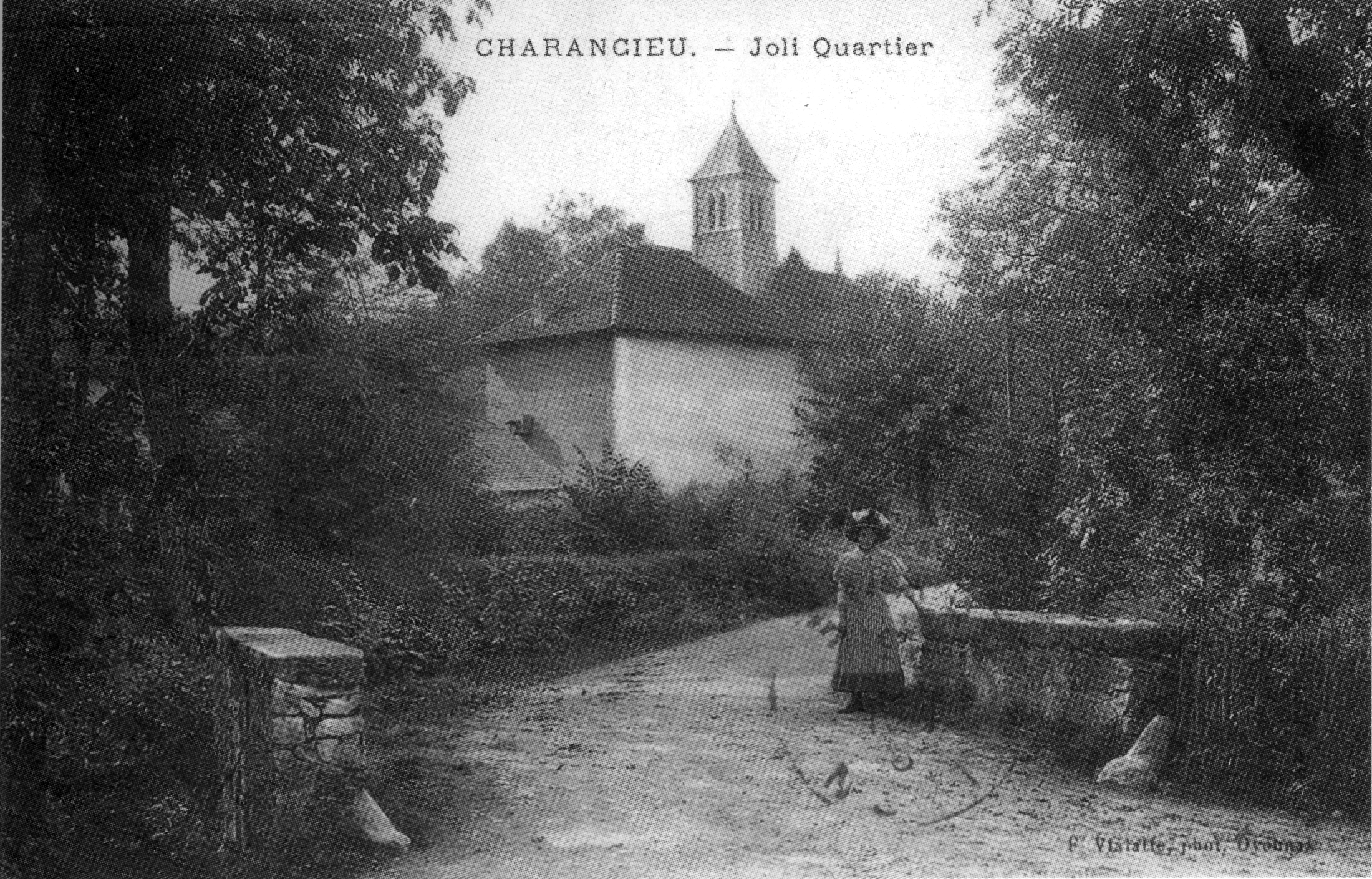
- A view of Charancieu in 1914
- Location of Charancieu
- Location within France Location within Auvergne-Rhône-Alpes
- Coordinates: 45°31′33″N 5°34′57″E
- Country: France
- Region: Auvergne-Rhône-Alpes
- Department: Isère
- Arrondissement: La Tour-du-Pin
- Canton: Chartreuse-Guiers
- Intercommunality: CA Pays Voironnais

Government
  - Mayor (2020–2026): Christian Guttin
- Area^{1}: 5.53 km^{2} (2.14 sq mi)
- Elevation: 406 m (1,332 ft)
- Highest elevation: 615 m (2,018 ft)
- Lowest elevation: 386 m (1,266 ft)
- Population (2023): 738
  - Density: 133/km^{2} (346/sq mi)
- Time zone: UTC+01:00 (CET)
  - Summer (DST): UTC+02:00 (CEST)
- INSEE/Postal code: 38080 /38490
- ^{1} French Land Register data, which excludes lakes, ponds, glaciers > 1 km^{2} (0.386 sq mi or 247 acres) and river estuaries.

Charancieu (French pronunciation: [ʃaʁɑ̃sjø]) is a commune in the Isère department in southeastern France.

== Population ==
Historical population
Year	Pop.	±% p.a.
1968	268	—
1975	289	+1.08%
1982	407	+5.01%
1990	521	+3.13%
1999	563	+0.87%
2007	688	+2.54%
2012	723	+1.00%
2017	774	+1.37%
2023	738	−0.79%
Source: INSEE

== See also ==
- Communes of the Isère department
