= La Murette =

- Commune
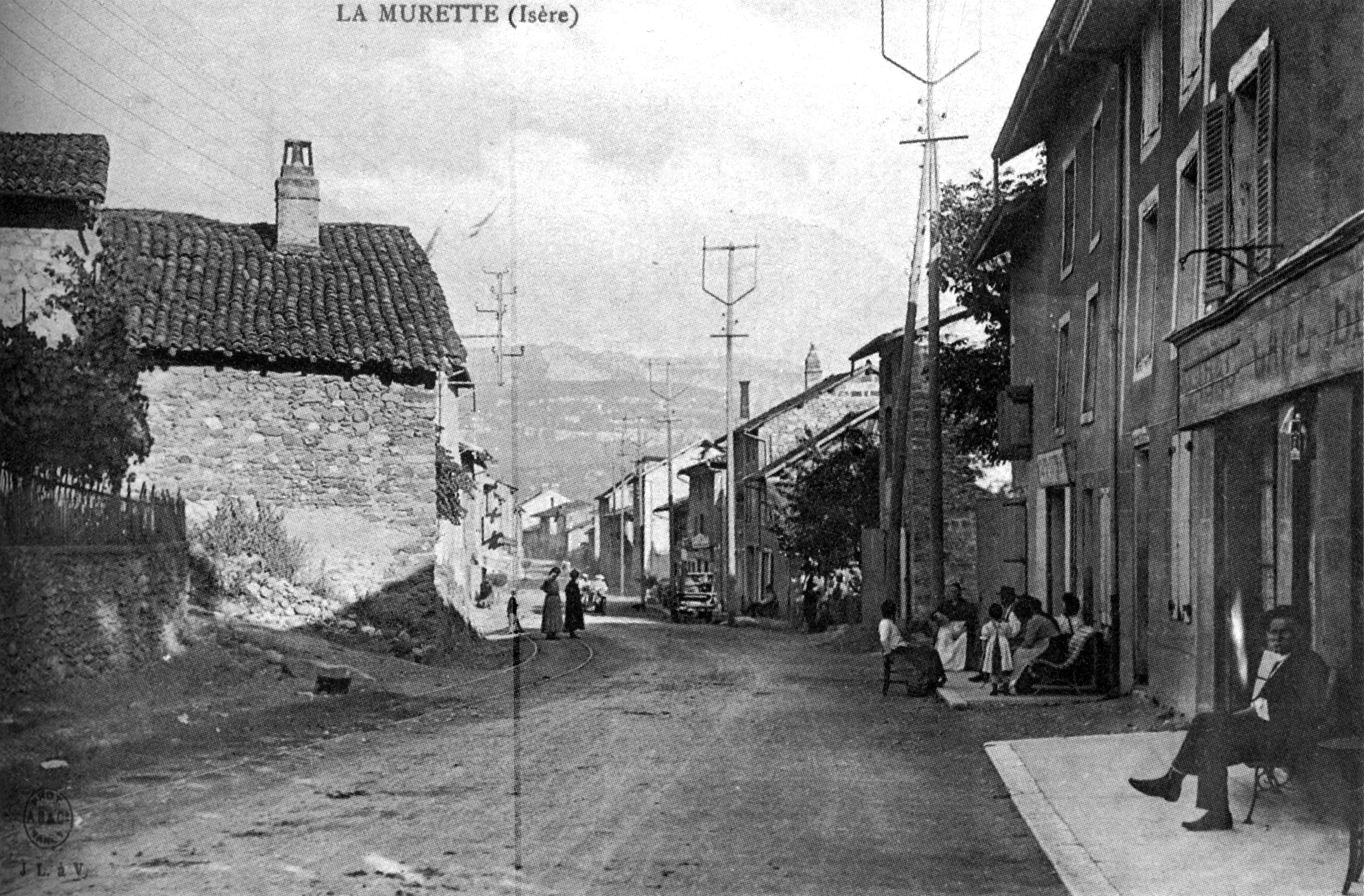
- La Murette in 1908

- Coat of arms
- Location of La Murette
- Location within France Location within Auvergne-Rhône-Alpes
- Coordinates: 45°22′54″N 5°32′26″E
- Country: France
- Region: Auvergne-Rhône-Alpes
- Department: Isère
- Arrondissement: Grenoble
- Canton: Voiron
- Intercommunality: CA Pays Voironnais

Government
  - Mayor (2020–2026): Carole Serayet
- Area^{1}: 4.22 km^{2} (1.63 sq mi)
- Highest elevation: 787 m (2,582 ft)
- Lowest elevation: 379 m (1,243 ft)
- Population (2023): 1,836
  - Density: 435/km^{2} (1,130/sq mi)
- Time zone: UTC+01:00 (CET)
  - Summer (DST): UTC+02:00 (CEST)
- INSEE/Postal code: 38270 /38140
- ^{1} French Land Register data, which excludes lakes, ponds, glaciers > 1 km^{2} (0.386 sq mi or 247 acres) and river estuaries.

La Murette (French pronunciation: [la myʁɛt]) is a commune in the Isère department in southeastern France.

== Population ==
Historical population
Year	Pop.	±% p.a.
1968	759	—
1975	832	+1.32%
1982	1,033	+3.14%
1990	1,322	+3.13%
1999	1,617	+2.26%
2007	1,748	+0.98%
2012	1,827	+0.89%
2017	1,884	+0.62%
2023	1,836	−0.43%
Source: INSEE

== See also ==
- Communes of the Isère department
