= Massieu =

- Commune
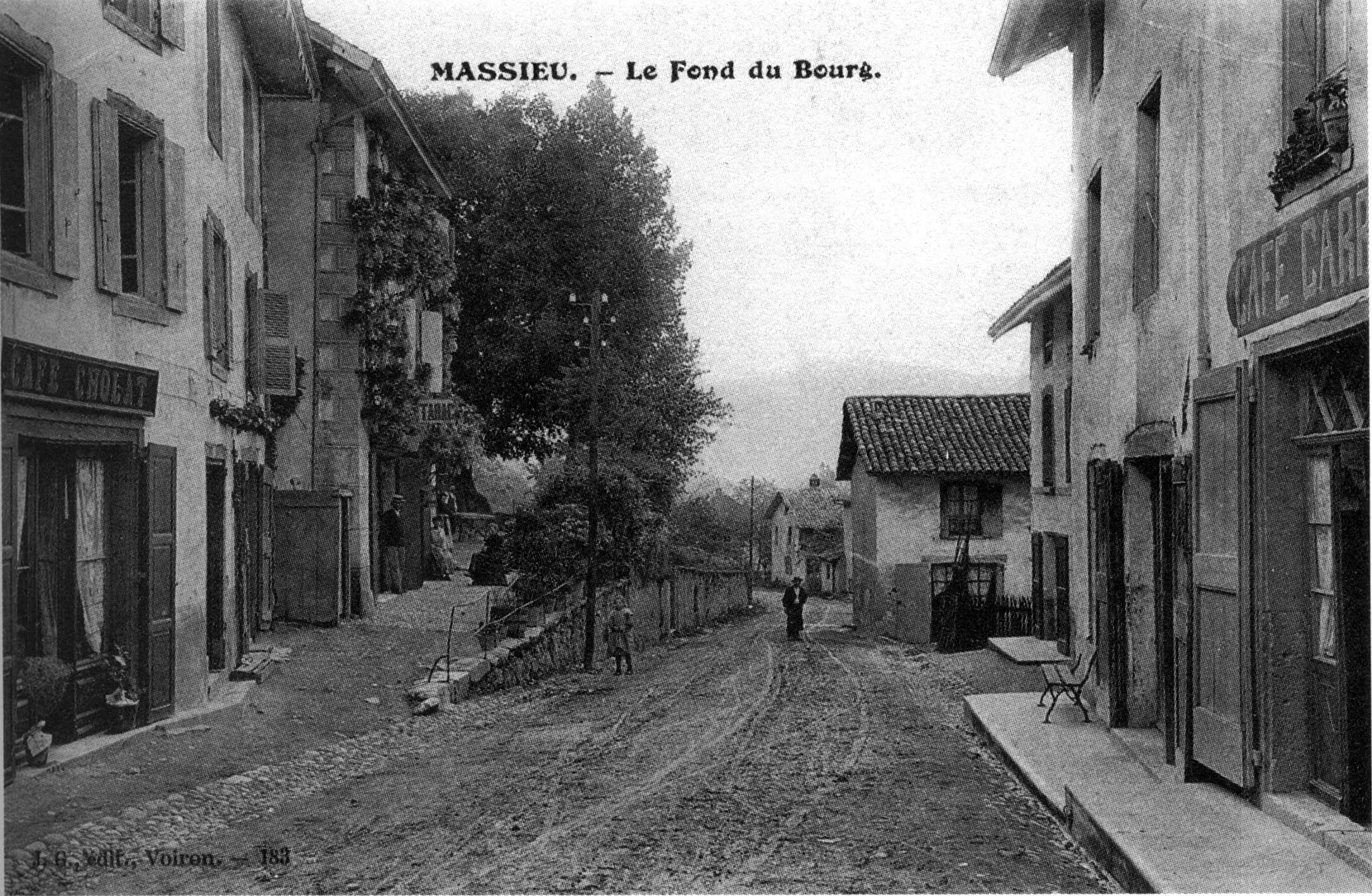
- Massieu in 1912
- Location of Massieu
- Location within France Location within Auvergne-Rhône-Alpes
- Coordinates: 45°26′26″N 5°35′50″E
- Country: France
- Region: Auvergne-Rhône-Alpes
- Department: Isère
- Arrondissement: La Tour-du-Pin
- Canton: Le Grand-Lemps
- Intercommunality: CA Pays Voironnais

Government
  - Mayor (2023–2026): Norbert Bouilhol
- Area^{1}: 10.46 km^{2} (4.04 sq mi)
- Highest elevation: 867 m (2,844 ft)
- Lowest elevation: 422 m (1,385 ft)
- Population (2023): 773
  - Density: 73.9/km^{2} (191/sq mi)
- Time zone: UTC+01:00 (CET)
  - Summer (DST): UTC+02:00 (CEST)
- INSEE/Postal code: 38222 /38620
- ^{1} French Land Register data, which excludes lakes, ponds, glaciers > 1 km^{2} (0.386 sq mi or 247 acres) and river estuaries.

Massieu (French pronunciation: [masjø]) is a commune in the Isère department in southeastern France.

== Population ==
Historical population
Year	Pop.	±% p.a.
1968	341	—
1975	317	−1.04%
1982	479	+6.07%
1990	662	+4.13%
1999	686	+0.40%
2007	750	+1.12%
2012	753	+0.08%
2017	747	−0.16%
2023	773	+0.57%
Source: INSEE

== See also ==
- Communes of the Isère department
