= Merlas =

- Commune
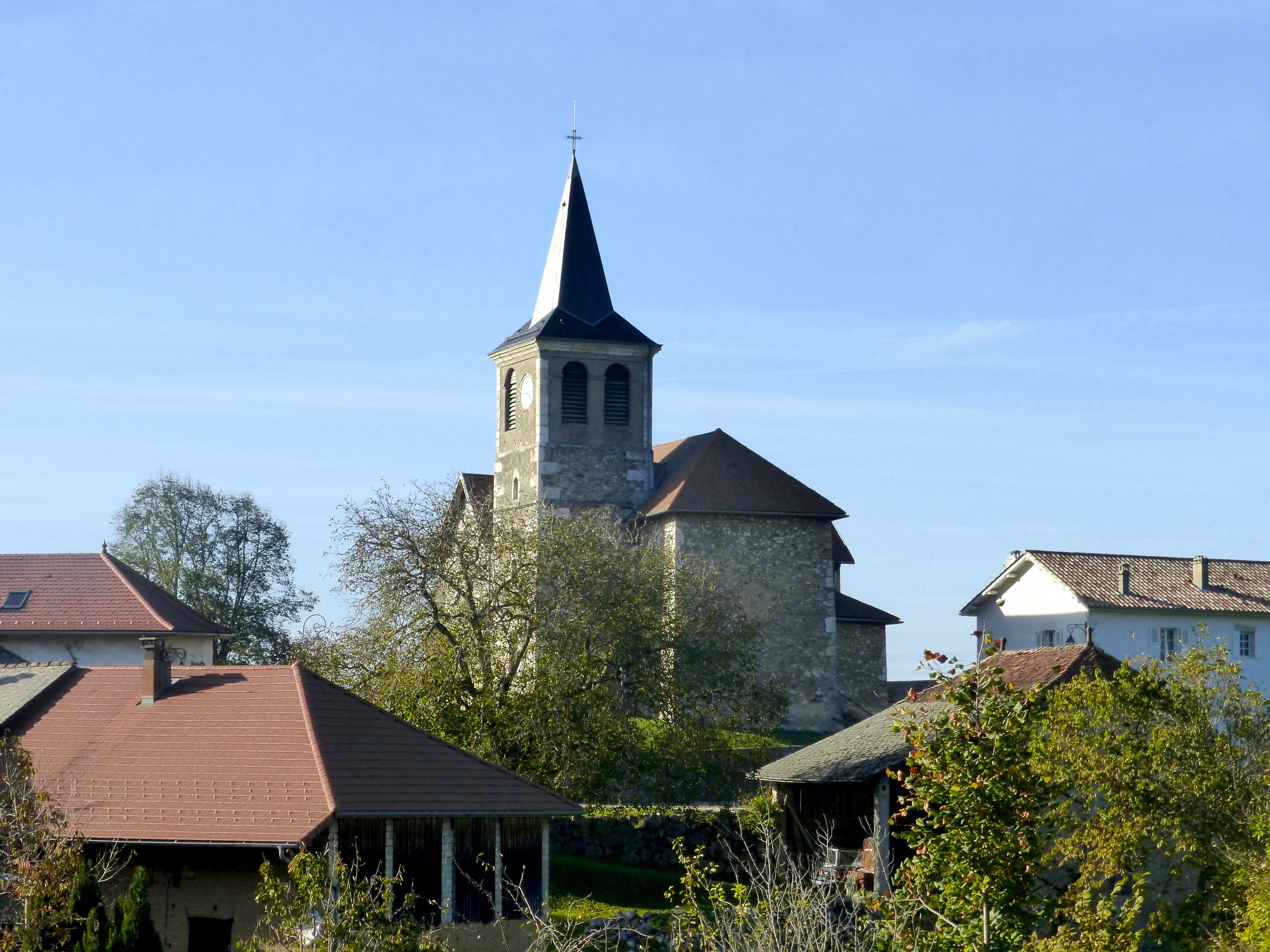
- The church of Saint-Ferréol
- Location of Merlas
- Location within France Location within Auvergne-Rhône-Alpes
- Coordinates: 45°26′44″N 5°39′48″E
- Country: France
- Region: Auvergne-Rhône-Alpes
- Department: Isère
- Arrondissement: La Tour-du-Pin
- Canton: Chartreuse-Guiers
- Intercommunality: CA Pays Voironnais

Government
  - Mayor (2020–2026): Denis Grandperrin
- Area^{1}: 15.64 km^{2} (6.04 sq mi)
- Elevation: 600 m (2,000 ft)
- Highest elevation: 925 m (3,035 ft)
- Lowest elevation: 400 m (1,300 ft)
- Population (2023): 465
  - Density: 29.7/km^{2} (77.0/sq mi)
- Time zone: UTC+01:00 (CET)
  - Summer (DST): UTC+02:00 (CEST)
- INSEE/Postal code: 38228 /38620
- ^{1} French Land Register data, which excludes lakes, ponds, glaciers > 1 km^{2} (0.386 sq mi or 247 acres) and river estuaries.

Merlas (French pronunciation: [mɛʁla]) is a commune in the Isère department in southeastern France.

== Population ==
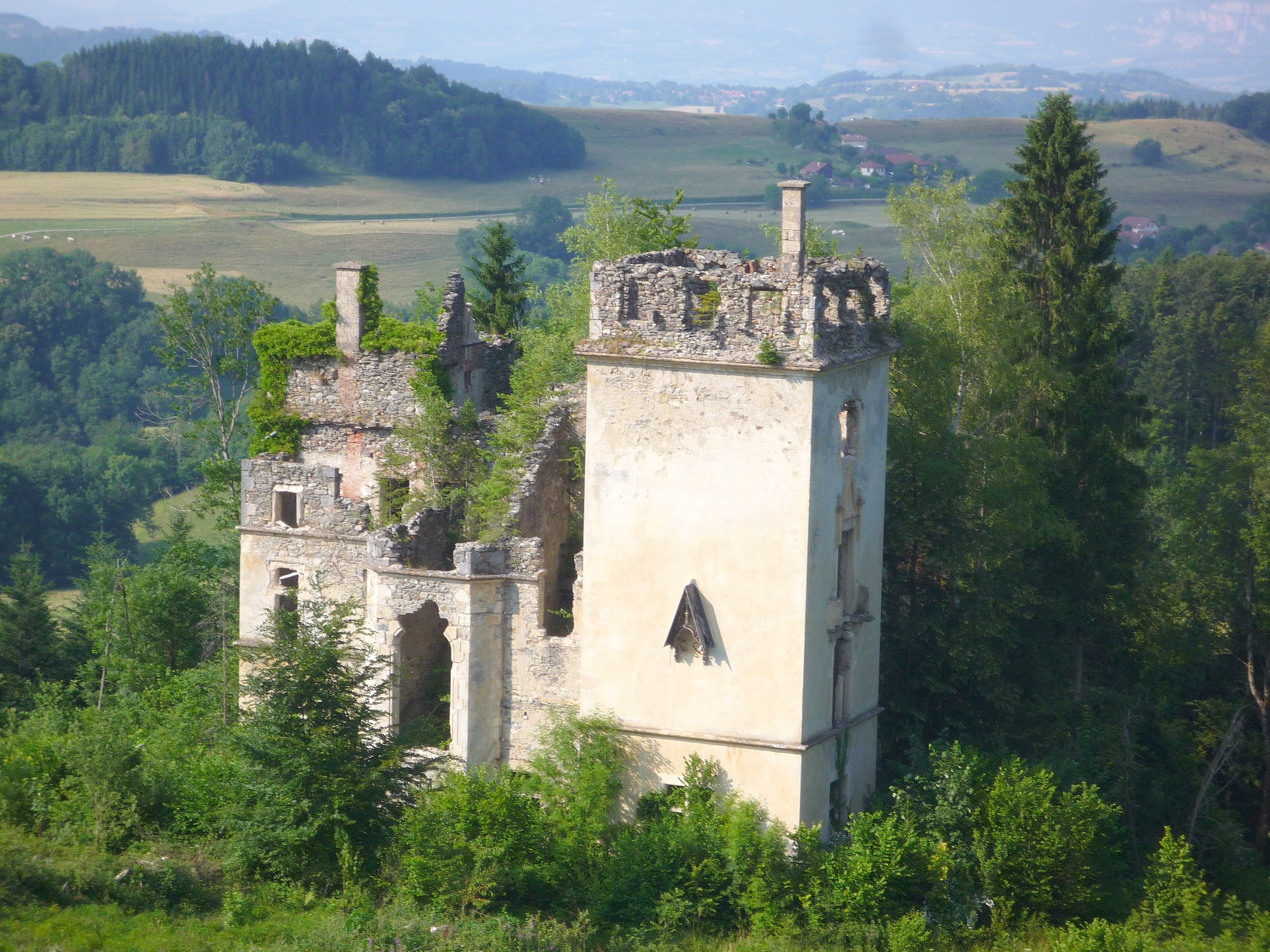
The ruins of the Saint-Sixte castle, in the town of Merlas

Historical population
Year	Pop.	±% p.a.
1968	373	—
1975	290	−3.53%
1982	320	+1.42%
1990	381	+2.20%
1999	405	+0.68%
2007	470	+1.88%
2012	496	+1.08%
2017	487	−0.37%
2023	465	−0.77%
Source: INSEE

== See also ==
- Communes of the Isère department
