= La Buisse =

- Commune
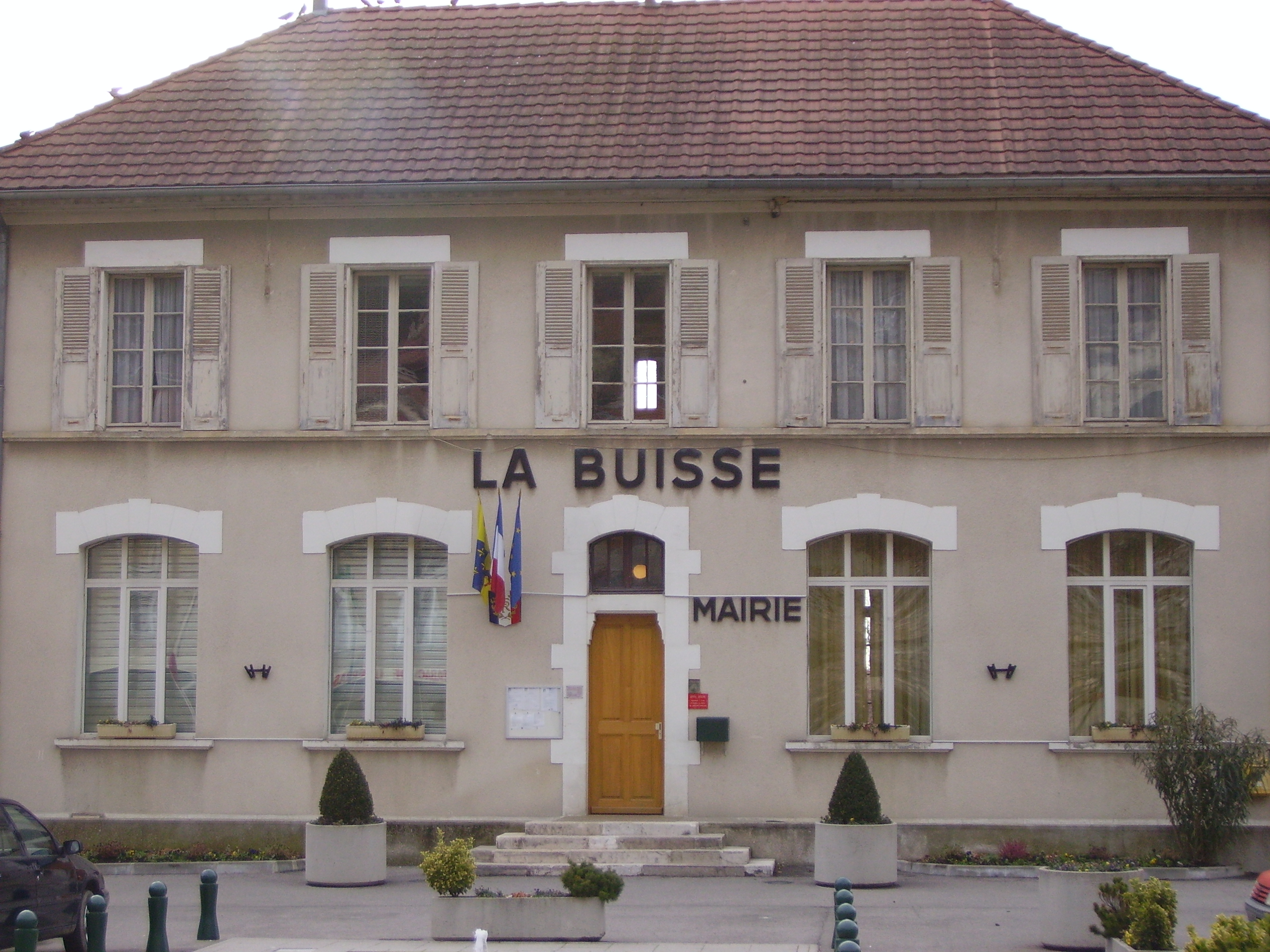
- Town hall
- Location of La Buisse
- Location within France Location within Auvergne-Rhône-Alpes
- Coordinates: 45°20′09″N 5°37′16″E
- Country: France
- Region: Auvergne-Rhône-Alpes
- Department: Isère
- Arrondissement: Grenoble
- Canton: Voiron
- Intercommunality: CA Pays Voironnais

Government
  - Mayor (2020–2026): Dominique Dessez
- Area^{1}: 11.52 km^{2} (4.45 sq mi)
- Highest elevation: 942 m (3,091 ft)
- Lowest elevation: 187 m (614 ft)
- Population (2023): 3,500
  - Density: 300/km^{2} (790/sq mi)
- Time zone: UTC+01:00 (CET)
  - Summer (DST): UTC+02:00 (CEST)
- INSEE/Postal code: 38061 /38500
- ^{1} French Land Register data, which excludes lakes, ponds, glaciers > 1 km^{2} (0.386 sq mi or 247 acres) and river estuaries.

La Buisse (French pronunciation: [la bɥis]) is a commune in the Isère department in southeastern France.

== Population ==
Historical population

Year	Pop.	±% p.a.
1793	1,138	—
1800	1,215	+0.94%
1806	1,305	+1.20%
1821	1,274	−0.16%
1831	1,347	+0.56%
1836	1,421	+1.08%
1841	1,407	−0.20%
1846	1,439	+0.45%
1851	1,295	−2.09%
1856	1,237	−0.91%
1861	1,175	−1.02%
1866	1,150	−0.43%
1872	1,078	−1.07%
1876	1,108	+0.69%
1881	1,044	−1.18%
1886	1,061	+0.32%
1891	996	−1.26%
1896	978	−0.36%
1901	973	−0.10%

Year	Pop.	±% p.a.
1906	898	−1.59%
1911	850	−1.09%
1921	797	−0.64%
1926	904	+2.55%
1931	995	+1.94%
1936	873	−2.58%
1946	884	+0.13%
1954	1,055	+2.24%
1962	1,087	+0.37%
1968	1,006	−1.28%
1975	1,050	+0.61%
1982	1,206	+2.00%
1990	2,238	+8.03%
1999	2,405	+0.80%
2007	2,637	+1.16%
2012	2,989	+2.54%
2017	3,142	+1.00%
2023	3,500	+1.81%

Source: EHESS and INSEE (1968-2023)

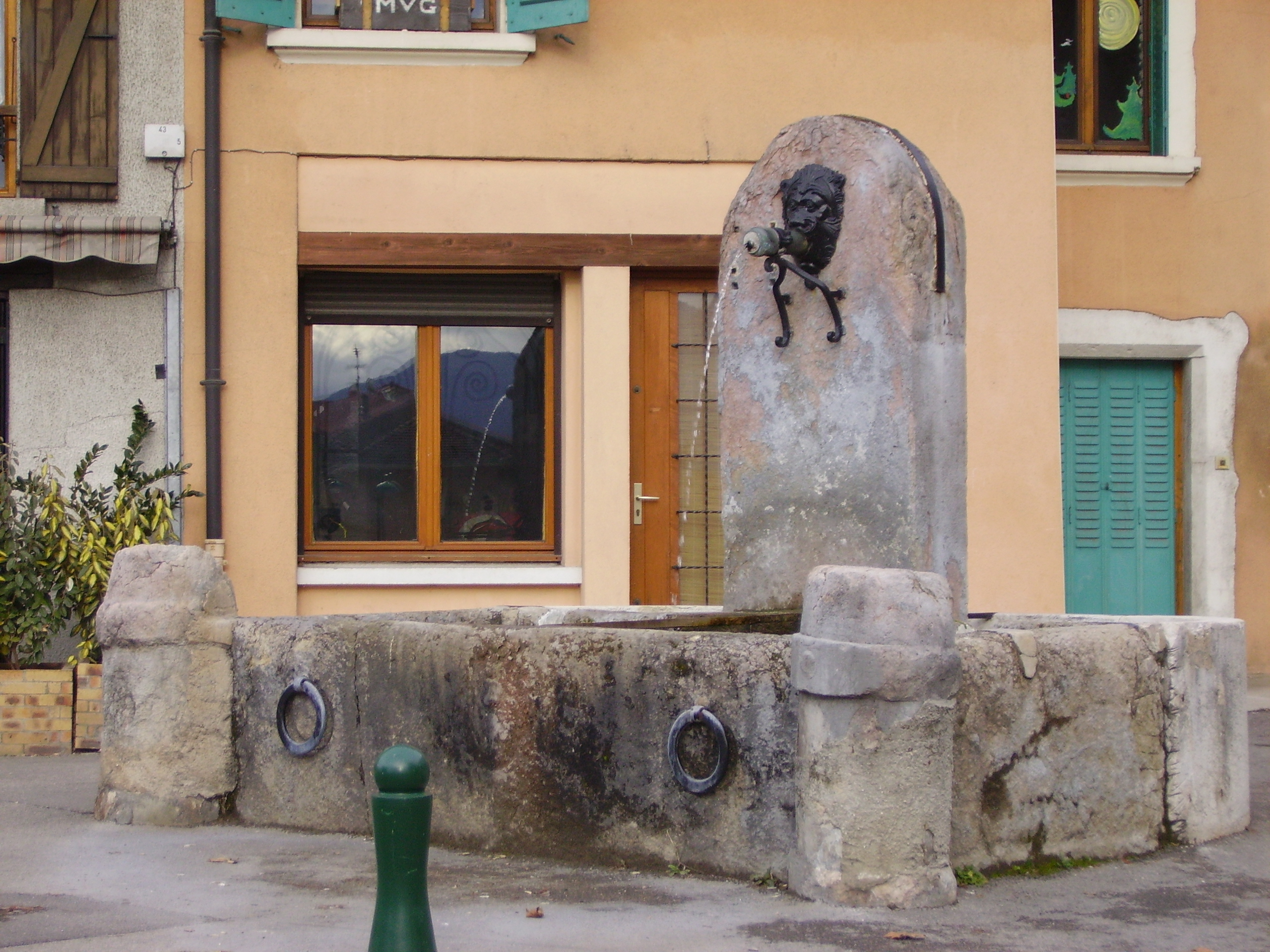
Medieval water fountain in La Buisse

== See also ==
- Communes of the Isère department
