= Saint-Nicolas-de-Macherin =

- Commune
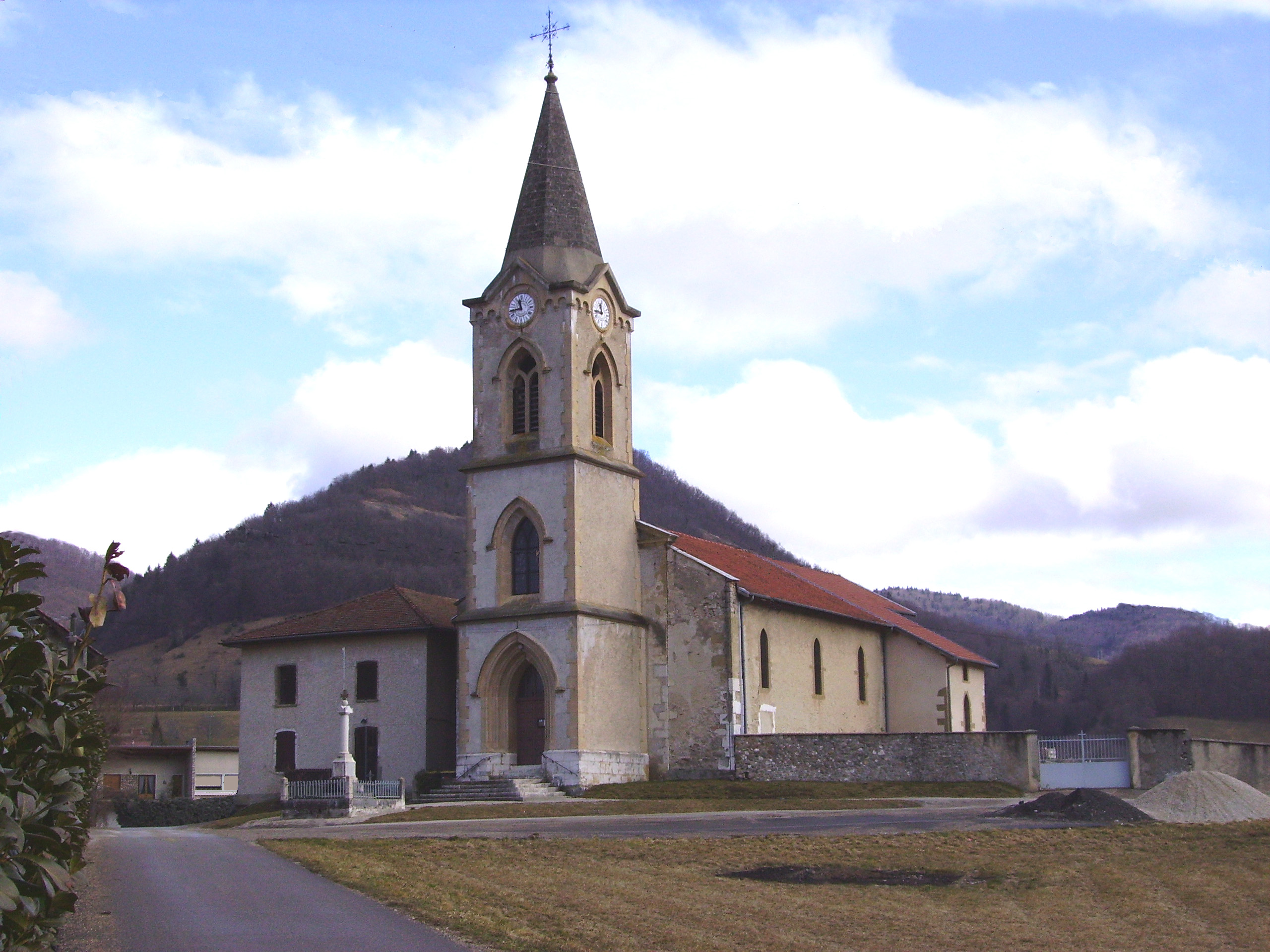
- The church of Saint-Nicolas-de-Macherin
- Location of Saint-Nicolas-de-Macherin
- Location within France Location within Auvergne-Rhône-Alpes
- Coordinates: 45°23′57″N 5°36′27″E
- Country: France
- Region: Auvergne-Rhône-Alpes
- Department: Isère
- Arrondissement: Grenoble
- Canton: Voiron
- Intercommunality: CA Pays Voironnais

Government
  - Mayor (2020–2026): Freddy Rey
- Area^{1}: 10.6 km^{2} (4.1 sq mi)
- Elevation: 420 m (1,380 ft)
- Highest elevation: 952 m (3,123 ft)
- Lowest elevation: 447 m (1,467 ft)
- Population (2023): 937
  - Density: 88.4/km^{2} (229/sq mi)
- Time zone: UTC+01:00 (CET)
  - Summer (DST): UTC+02:00 (CEST)
- INSEE/Postal code: 38432 /38500
- ^{1} French Land Register data, which excludes lakes, ponds, glaciers > 1 km^{2} (0.386 sq mi or 247 acres) and river estuaries.

Saint-Nicolas-de-Macherin (French pronunciation: [sɛ̃ nikɔla də maʃʁɛ̃]) is a commune in the Isère department within Auvergne-Rhône-Alpes in southeastern France. The area of the commune is 1,060 hectares and the altitude lies between 447 and 952 meters.

The town is located 5 km from Voiron, which is the seat of the canton. It is 28 km north-west of Grenoble, 90 km from Lyon, and 510 km from Paris.

== Population ==
Historical population

Year	Pop.	±% p.a.
1793	643	—
1821	701	+0.31%
1846	857	+0.81%
1872	687	−0.85%
1901	514	−1.00%
1926	435	−0.67%
1946	420	−0.18%
1962	384	−0.56%
1968	380	−0.17%

Year	Pop.	±% p.a.
1975	389	+0.33%
1982	518	+4.18%
1990	615	+2.17%
1999	782	+2.71%
2007	892	+1.66%
2012	881	−0.25%
2017	938	+1.26%
2023	937	−0.02%

Source: EHESS and INSEE (1968-2023)

=== Housing ===
As of 2020, 89.6% of households live in single-family houses, compared to 10.4% in apartments. 93.5% of housing are main residences, 2.2% are second homes and the rest being vacant. 19% of housing was built before 1919, while 55% was built between 1971 and 2005.

== Places of interest ==
- Château de Hautefort - the oldest building in the town, now divided into apartments.
- Pied Barlet - ruins of the ancient fortress from the 13th century.
- Chapel of Hautefort castle
- Church of Saint Nicolas, rebuilt between 1885 and 1889, designed by architect Jean-Francois Pichat.

== Economy ==
In 2020, 4.3% of the active population was unemployed. This is low in comparison to the department unemployment rate of 10.4% for the same period.

The SITPM (Société Industrielle des Tissages Paul Merle) employs 58 people and manufactures fabrics. This factory was created in 1853 under the name of Usine de Tissage de Sainte-Marie d'Hautefort. The site covers 15,000m² and has more than 130 automated looms.

The town is part of the geographical area of production and transformation of Bois de Chartreuse, the first AOC of the wood sector in France.

== Administration ==
List of successive mayors
Period		Identity	Label	Quality
2020	Current	Freddy Rey		
2001	2020	Roland Grambin	None	
1989	2001	Marcel Descombes	None	
1965	1989	Jean Tabeling	None	
1945		Paul Merle		
1944	1945	Jean Marcoz		(Provisional municipal council)
1943	1944	Joseph Gaillard		(Deputy mayor following the resignation of Louis Fauchon)
1925	1943	Louis Fauchon		
	1925	Liguori Vial		
1892		Remy Fagot		
1883	1892	Francois Guilligay		
1868	1883	Antoine Fagot-Mallot		
1863	1868	Joseph Vial		
1811	1813	Jean Tivollier		
1807	1811	Jean Vial		

== Notable people ==
- Paul Picard - deputy for Isère, born and died in the town.
- Amédée de Foras - politician and diplomat, married and lived in the town at the Château de Hautefort.
- Family of Mourand de Jouffrey - descendants of Jean-Antione Morand de Jouffrey, who worked in Lyon (1727–1794) and created the 6th arrondissement (Brotteaux). A bridge, as well as a car park, still bear his name. His son, Antoine Morand de Jouffrey, was appointed the attorney general of the king at the Lyon finance office in 1785.

== See also ==
- Communes of the Isère department
