= Chimilin =

- Commune
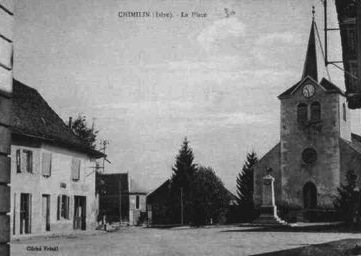
- The church square at the start of the 20th century

- Coat of arms
- Location of Chimilin
- Location within France Location within Auvergne-Rhône-Alpes
- Coordinates: 45°34′41″N 5°36′01″E
- Country: France
- Region: Auvergne-Rhône-Alpes
- Department: Isère
- Arrondissement: La Tour-du-Pin
- Canton: Chartreuse-Guiers
- Intercommunality: Les Vals du Dauphiné

Government
  - Mayor (2020–2026): Edmond Decoux
- Area^{1}: 9.66 km^{2} (3.73 sq mi)
- Highest elevation: 362 m (1,188 ft)
- Lowest elevation: 228 m (748 ft)
- Population (2023): 1,417
  - Density: 147/km^{2} (380/sq mi)
- Time zone: UTC+01:00 (CET)
  - Summer (DST): UTC+02:00 (CEST)
- INSEE/Postal code: 38104 /38490
- ^{1} French Land Register data, which excludes lakes, ponds, glaciers > 1 km^{2} (0.386 sq mi or 247 acres) and river estuaries.

Chimilin (French pronunciation: [ʃimilɛ̃]) is a commune in the Isère department in southeastern France.

== Population ==
Historical population
Year	Pop.	±% p.a.
1968	814	—
1975	781	−0.59%
1982	942	+2.71%
1990	1,044	+1.29%
1999	1,144	+1.02%
2007	1,306	+1.67%
2012	1,399	+1.39%
2017	1,452	+0.75%
2023	1,417	−0.41%
Source: INSEE

== See also ==
- Communes of the Isère department
