= Voreppe =

- Commune
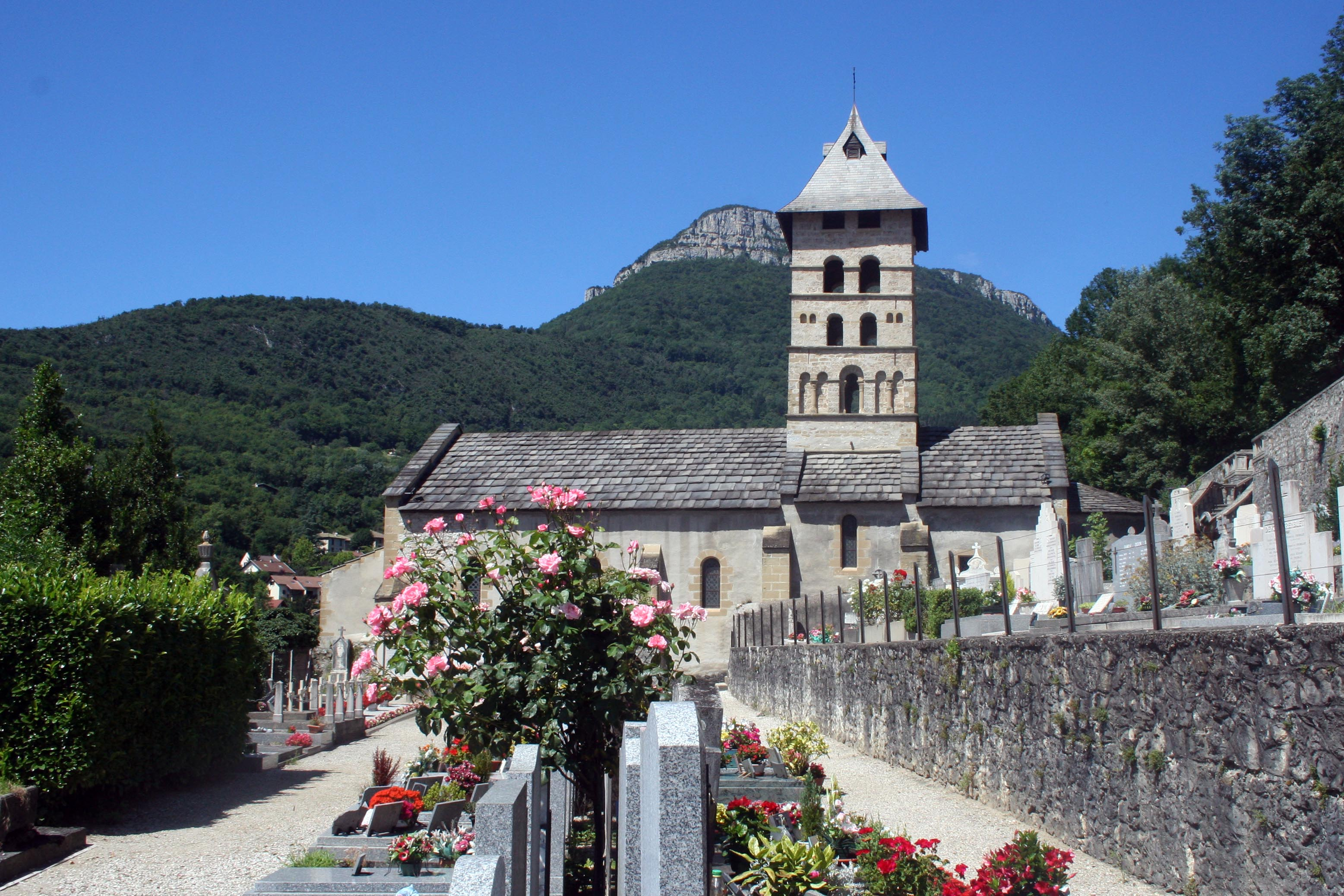
- Church of Saint-Didier

- Coat of arms
- Location of Voreppe
- Location within France Location within Auvergne-Rhône-Alpes
- Coordinates: 45°17′55″N 5°38′15″E
- Country: France
- Region: Auvergne-Rhône-Alpes
- Department: Isère
- Arrondissement: Grenoble
- Canton: Voiron
- Intercommunality: Pays Voironnais

Government
  - Mayor (2020–2026): Luc Rémond
- Area^{1}: 28.65 km^{2} (11.06 sq mi)
- Elevation: 249 m (817 ft)
- Highest elevation: 1,702 m (5,584 ft)
- Lowest elevation: 185 m (607 ft)
- Population (2023): 9,922
  - Density: 346.3/km^{2} (897.0/sq mi)
- Time zone: UTC+01:00 (CET)
  - Summer (DST): UTC+02:00 (CEST)
- INSEE/Postal code: 38565 /38340
- ^{1} French Land Register data, which excludes lakes, ponds, glaciers > 1 km^{2} (0.386 sq mi or 247 acres) and river estuaries.

Voreppe (French pronunciation: [vɔʁˈɛp]) is a commune in the Isère department in southeastern France. It is part of the Grenoble urban unit (agglomeration). The commune contains the Monastère de Chalais, a Dominican monastery about 7 kilometres (4.3 mi) from the town of Voreppe.

== Population ==
Historical population

Year	Pop.	±% p.a.
1793	2,395	—
1800	2,522	+0.74%
1806	2,965	+2.73%
1821	2,521	−1.08%
1831	3,280	+2.67%
1836	3,071	−1.31%
1841	3,005	−0.43%
1846	3,021	+0.11%
1851	2,970	−0.34%
1856	3,060	+0.60%
1861	2,887	−1.16%
1866	2,733	−1.09%
1872	2,769	+0.22%
1876	2,954	+1.63%
1881	2,886	−0.46%
1886	2,869	−0.12%
1891	2,815	−0.38%
1896	2,908	+0.65%
1901	3,005	+0.66%

Year	Pop.	±% p.a.
1906	2,722	−1.96%
1911	2,600	−0.91%
1921	2,426	−0.69%
1926	2,670	+1.94%
1931	2,801	+0.96%
1936	2,859	+0.41%
1946	2,611	−0.90%
1954	3,099	+2.16%
1962	3,617	+1.95%
1968	4,785	+4.77%
1975	5,995	+3.27%
1982	7,970	+4.15%
1990	8,446	+0.73%
1999	9,231	+0.99%
2007	9,655	+0.56%
2012	9,653	−0.00%
2017	9,293	−0.76%
2023	9,922	+1.10%

Source: EHESS and INSEE (1968-2023)

== Twin towns ==
Voreppe is twinned with:

- Lichtenstein, Baden-Württemberg, Germany, since 1992
- Castelnovo ne' Monti, Italy, since 1994
- Lapoș, Romania, since 1990

== See also ==
- Communes of the Isère department
