= Romagnieu =

- Commune
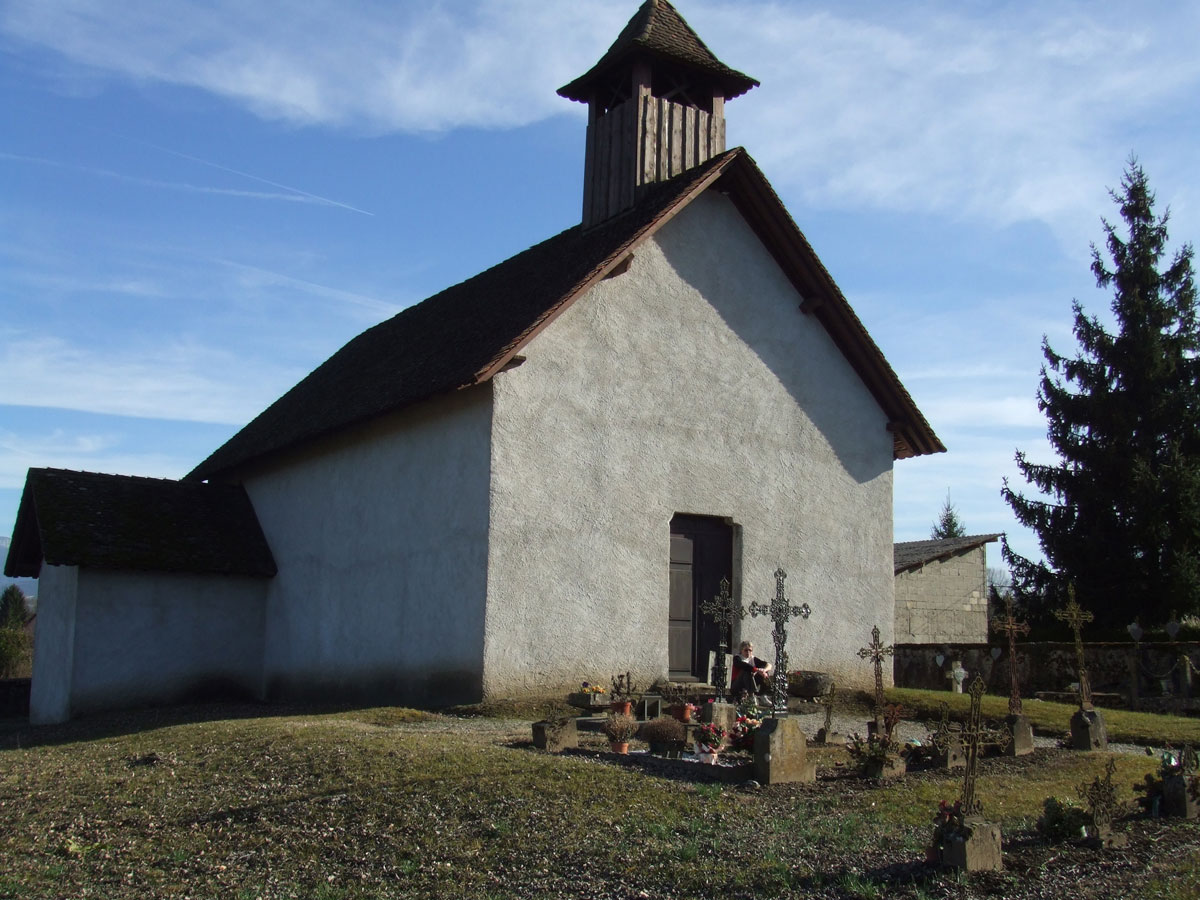
- The chapel of Avaux
- Location of Romagnieu
- Location within France Location within Auvergne-Rhône-Alpes
- Coordinates: 45°34′15″N 5°38′32″E
- Country: France
- Region: Auvergne-Rhône-Alpes
- Department: Isère
- Arrondissement: La Tour-du-Pin
- Canton: Chartreuse-Guiers
- Intercommunality: Les Vals du Dauphiné

Government
  - Mayor (2020–2026): Céline Revol
- Area^{1}: 17.11 km^{2} (6.61 sq mi)
- Elevation: 350 m (1,150 ft)
- Highest elevation: 364 m (1,194 ft)
- Lowest elevation: 218 m (715 ft)
- Population (2023): 1,753
  - Density: 102.5/km^{2} (265.4/sq mi)
- Time zone: UTC+01:00 (CET)
  - Summer (DST): UTC+02:00 (CEST)
- INSEE/Postal code: 38343 /38480
- ^{1} French Land Register data, which excludes lakes, ponds, glaciers > 1 km^{2} (0.386 sq mi or 247 acres) and river estuaries.

Romagnieu (French pronunciation: [ʁɔmaɲø]) is a commune in the Isère department in southeastern France.

== Population ==
Historical population

Year	Pop.	±% p.a.
1793	1,125	—
1800	1,375	+2.91%
1806	1,514	+1.62%
1821	1,762	+1.02%
1831	1,990	+1.22%
1836	2,013	+0.23%
1841	1,931	−0.83%
1846	1,990	+0.60%
1851	2,025	+0.35%
1856	1,889	−1.38%
1861	1,892	+0.03%
1866	1,853	−0.42%
1872	1,860	+0.06%
1876	1,843	−0.23%
1881	1,772	−0.78%
1886	1,762	−0.11%
1891	1,638	−1.45%
1896	1,601	−0.46%
1901	1,590	−0.14%

Year	Pop.	±% p.a.
1906	1,525	−0.83%
1911	1,509	−0.21%
1921	1,255	−1.83%
1926	1,242	−0.21%
1931	1,127	−1.92%
1936	1,074	−0.96%
1946	1,016	−0.55%
1954	1,040	+0.29%
1962	949	−1.14%
1968	931	−0.32%
1975	870	−0.96%
1982	993	+1.91%
1990	1,122	+1.54%
1999	1,235	+1.07%
2007	1,379	+1.39%
2012	1,524	+2.02%
2017	1,580	+0.72%
2023	1,753	+1.75%

Source: EHESS and INSEE (1968-2023)

== See also ==
- Communes of the Isère department
