= Beaucroissant =

- Commune
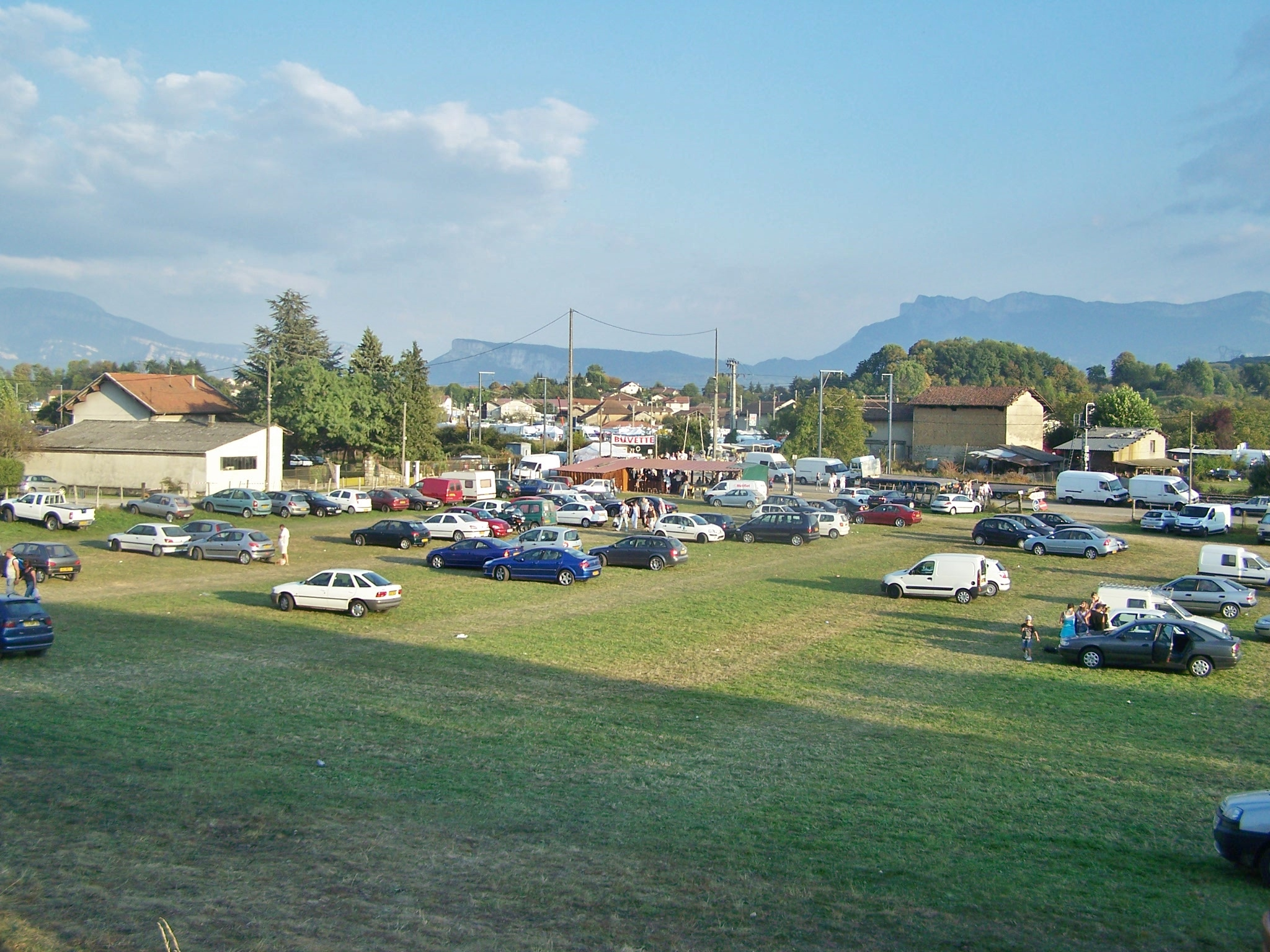
- Beaucroissant during the foire de Beaucroissant event, in 2007

- Coat of arms
- Location of Beaucroissant
- Location within France Location within Auvergne-Rhône-Alpes
- Coordinates: 45°20′29″N 5°28′15″E
- Country: France
- Region: Auvergne-Rhône-Alpes
- Department: Isère
- Arrondissement: Grenoble
- Canton: Tullins
- Intercommunality: Bièvre Est

Government
  - Mayor (2020–2026): Antoine Reboul
- Area^{1}: 11.18 km^{2} (4.32 sq mi)
- Highest elevation: 753 m (2,470 ft)
- Lowest elevation: 332 m (1,089 ft)
- Population (2023): 1,790
  - Density: 160/km^{2} (415/sq mi)
- Time zone: UTC+01:00 (CET)
  - Summer (DST): UTC+02:00 (CEST)
- INSEE/Postal code: 38030 /38140
- ^{1} French Land Register data, which excludes lakes, ponds, glaciers > 1 km^{2} (0.386 sq mi or 247 acres) and river estuaries.

Beaucroissant (French pronunciation: [bokʁwasˈɑ̃]) is a commune in the Isère department in the Auvergne-Rhône-Alpes region of south-eastern France.

== Geography ==
Beaucroissant is located some 32 km south by south-east of Bourgoin-Jallieu and 25 km north-west of Grenoble. Access to the commune is by the D1085 road from La Frette in the north-west which passes through the commune just north of the village and continues east to Moirans. The D519 comes from Izeaux in the west and passes through the commune turning north to join the A48 autoroute at Exit 9 . A railway from Le Grand-Lemps passes through the commune with a station in the village and continues north-east to Rives. Apart from the village there is the hamlet of Le Mollard. Apart from the large urban area of the village and Le Mollard the commune is mainly farmland.

== Toponymy ==
Beaucroissant appears as Beaucroißant on the 1750 Cassini Map and as Beaucroissant on the 1790 version.

== History ==
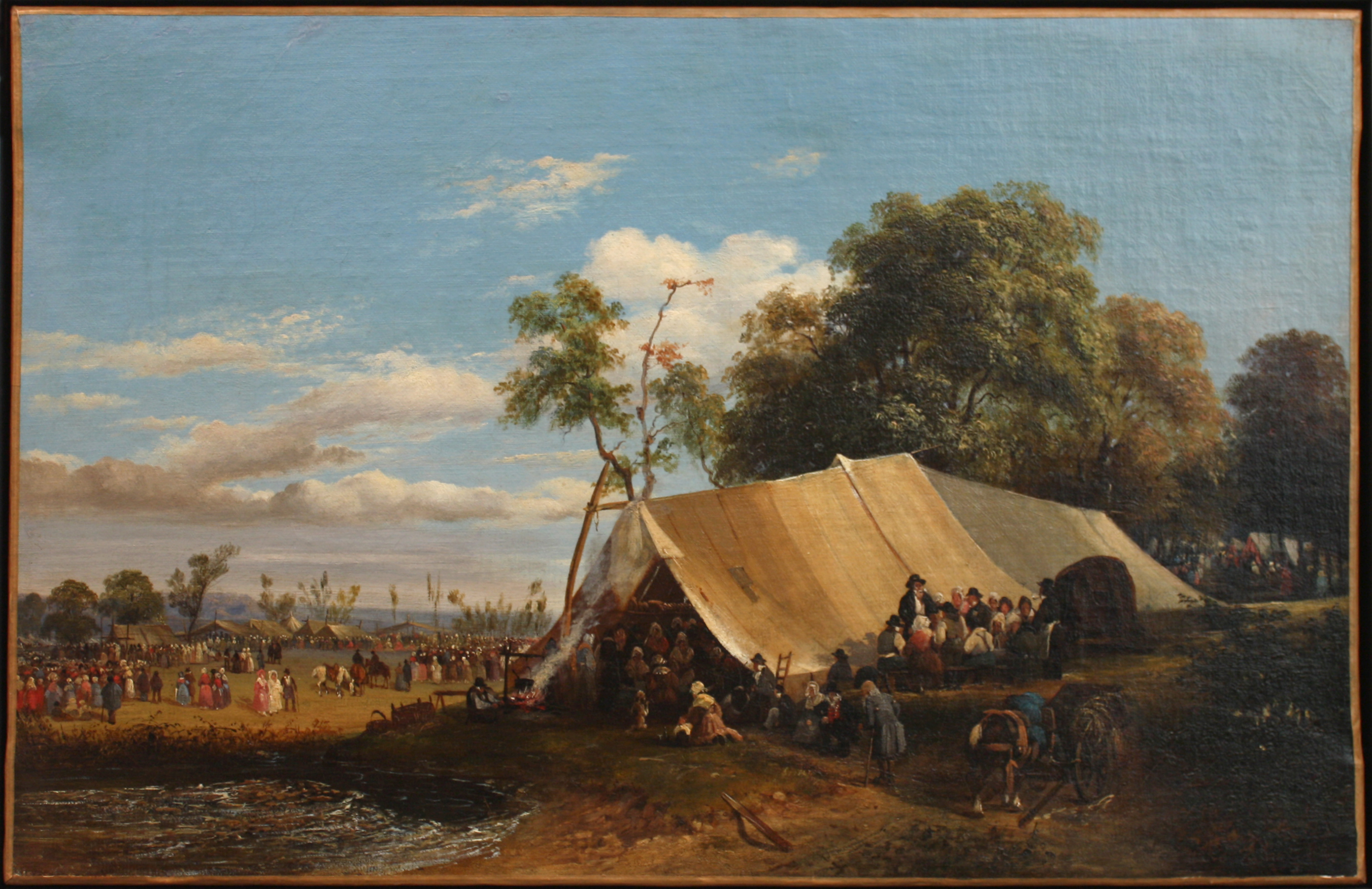
The Beaucroissant Fair, painting by Théodore Ravanat collection of the Musée dauphinois

The commune is famous for its annual fair which has continued since 1219 due to the pilgrimage of Our Lady of Parménie. The history of the village and the Fair is linked with the Parménie hill that dominates the commune with its 749-metre altitude.

The origin of the Beaucroissant fair dates back to 14 September 1219 when the Saint Laurent lake (above the Bourg d'Oisans) overflowed causing a terrible flood that inundated Grenoble and had many victims. Starting from 14 September 1220, organised by the bishop of Grenoble, survivors commemorated this event with a pilgrimage to Parménie. They were so numerous that a village was needed to accommodate them. The assembly attracted many merchants so the Fair of Beaucroissant was begun.

=== Heraldry ===
Arms of Beaucroissant	The official status of the blazon remains to be determined. Blazon: Party per bend sinister, at 1 Azure a cow's head caboshed Argent; at 2 Vert a horse's head Argent; in chief Gules, a crescent Argent from which spread nine rays the same.

== Administration ==
List of Successive Mayors

From	To	Name
2008	2011	Pierre Fouque
2011	2020	Georges Civet
2020	2026	Antoine Reboul

== Demography ==
The inhabitants of the commune are known as Manants or Manantes in French.

Historical population

Year	Pop.	±% p.a.
1793	627	—
1800	721	+2.02%
1806	725	+0.09%
1821	836	+0.95%
1831	816	−0.24%
1836	405	−13.07%
1841	925	+17.96%
1846	926	+0.02%
1851	926	+0.00%
1856	868	−1.29%
1861	869	+0.02%
1866	867	−0.05%
1872	831	−0.70%
1876	875	+1.30%
1881	888	+0.30%
1886	889	+0.02%
1891	848	−0.94%
1896	832	−0.38%
1901	836	+0.10%

Year	Pop.	±% p.a.
1906	834	−0.05%
1911	763	−1.76%
1921	710	−0.72%
1926	720	+0.28%
1931	739	+0.52%
1936	653	−2.44%
1946	653	+0.00%
1954	705	+0.96%
1962	752	+0.81%
1968	762	+0.22%
1975	1,041	+4.56%
1982	1,091	+0.67%
1990	1,236	+1.57%
1999	1,288	+0.46%
2007	1,435	+1.36%
2012	1,567	+1.78%
2017	1,725	+1.94%
2023	1,790	+0.62%

Source: EHESS and INSEE

== Economy ==
The Beaucroissant Fair, which takes place twice a year, is the main economy of the commune. In 2015 it took place on 25 and 26 April and on 11, 12, and 13 September together with the cattle fair on Friday 11 September.

== Sites and Monuments ==
- A Composite Church contains two items that are registered as historical objects:
  - A Bronze Bell (1548)
  - A Reliquary-Monstrance (17th century)
- The Priory of Our Lady of Parménie was a Chartreuse of women in the 13th century. It was burnt down in the 15th century, rebuilt in the 17th century, burnt down in 1944, then restored.

== See also ==
- Communes of the Isère department
