= Antoine Pâris =

18th-century French financier

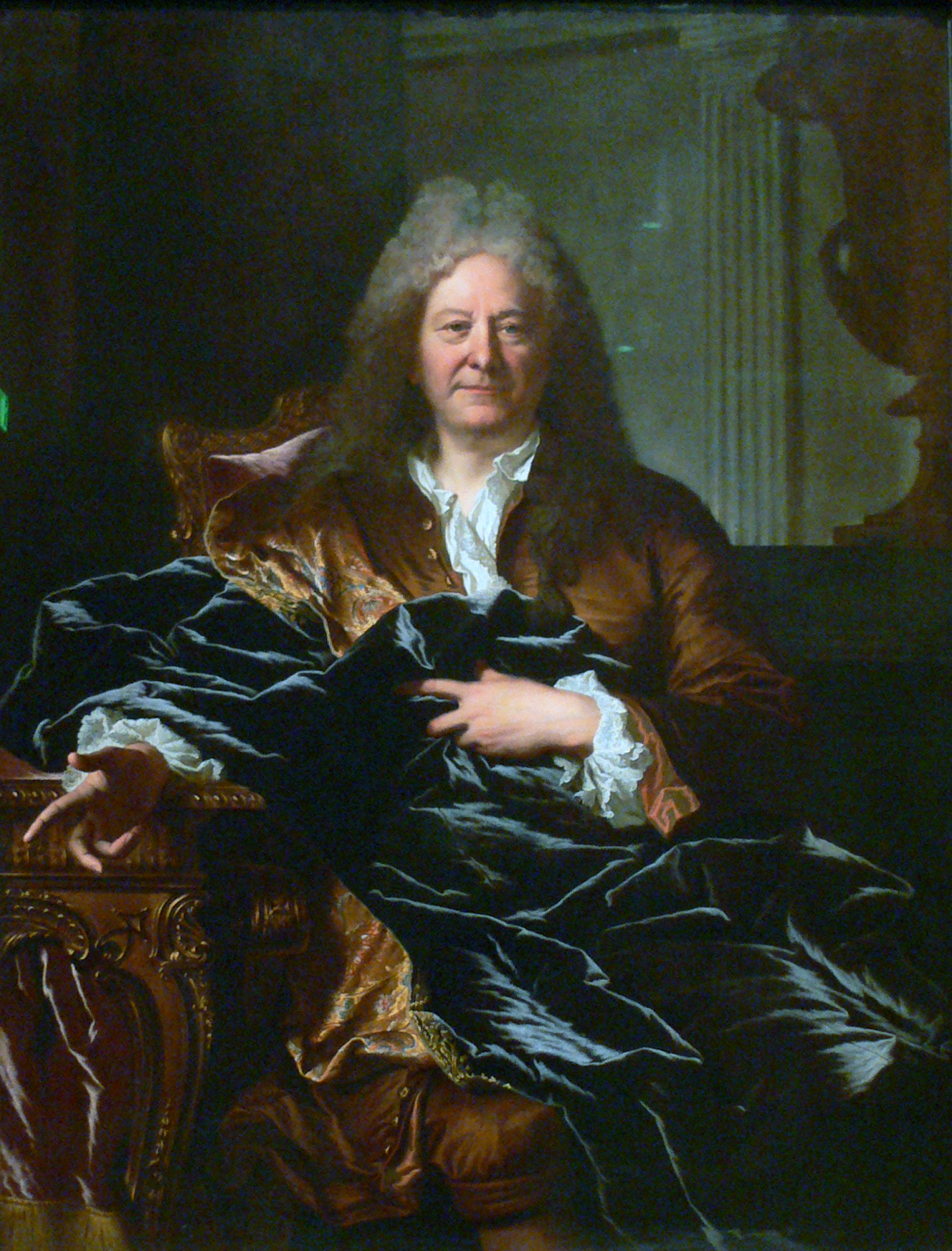
Portrait of Antoine Pâris by Hyacinthe Rigaud

Antoine Pâris, known as French: le Grand Pâris (“the Great Pâris”) (February 9, 1668, Moirans - July 29, 1734, Sampigny) was the eldest of the four Pâris brothers, who were all financiers during the reign of Louis XV.

== Early career ==
After studying law in Grenoble with his brother Claude, he became a lawyer in the fr:Parlement du Dauphiné where he established a valuable network of contacts with the nobility of the province. At 33, with his younger brother Claude, he succeeded in April 1691 the feat of supplying French troops surrounded by the armies of Charles Emmanuel II, Duke of Savoy, in Pinerolo during the War of the League of Augsburg. In 1692, with his other brother Antoine, he was in charge of supplies to the military encampment at Sablons. In 1693, he was able to source a thousand mules and three thousand bags in the Vivarais, allowing him to supply the royal army during the siege of Montmélian.

== The famine of 1693-1694 ==
During the great famine of 1693-1694 Antoine Paris was entrusted with supplying the population of Dauphiné, using logistical approaches developed during military campaigns. The State was slow to reimburse them for the costs incurred during the various campaigns, so Antoine Pâris moved to Paris in 1696 to claim what he was owed. There he embarked on various trading operations with his brother Claude. The start of the War of the Spanish Succession saw him appointed Director General of Food for the Army of Flanders in 1704.

== The Great Famine of 1709 ==
He was again responsible for supplying the troops during the Great Famine of 1709. Louis XIV had decided, at the opening of the campaign, that the Dauphin would command the army of Flanders. Before letting him go, the minister of war, Michel Chamillart, was asked about the situation in the storehouses on the frontier. Deceived by one of his agents, the minister affirmed that there were two hundred and forty thousand sacks of wheat there. The Pâris brothers proved by irrefutable documents that the provisions of the frontier amounted in fact to no more than seven thousand bags, and that a thousand bags were needed every day.

The removal of the provisions which, for greater safety, had been moved to Picardy, caused a new embarrassment. His brother, Pâris-Duverney, remedied this by having his crews cover thirty-five leagues in seventy-two hours. A few days later, he entered, under a disguise, the place of Mons, controlled by the enemy, and, in half a day, brought back the information on the situation of the stores, which had been sent the same day to the deputies of the Dutch Republic and to Prince Eugene of Savoy.

During the siege of Douai (1712), there was a shortage of horses. 3,000 used to carry supplies were made available to the soldiers and 1,800 perished, but the Pâris brothers made up for the shortfall and were paid in state notes, reimbursable in 1716.

== The pavilion of Bercy ==
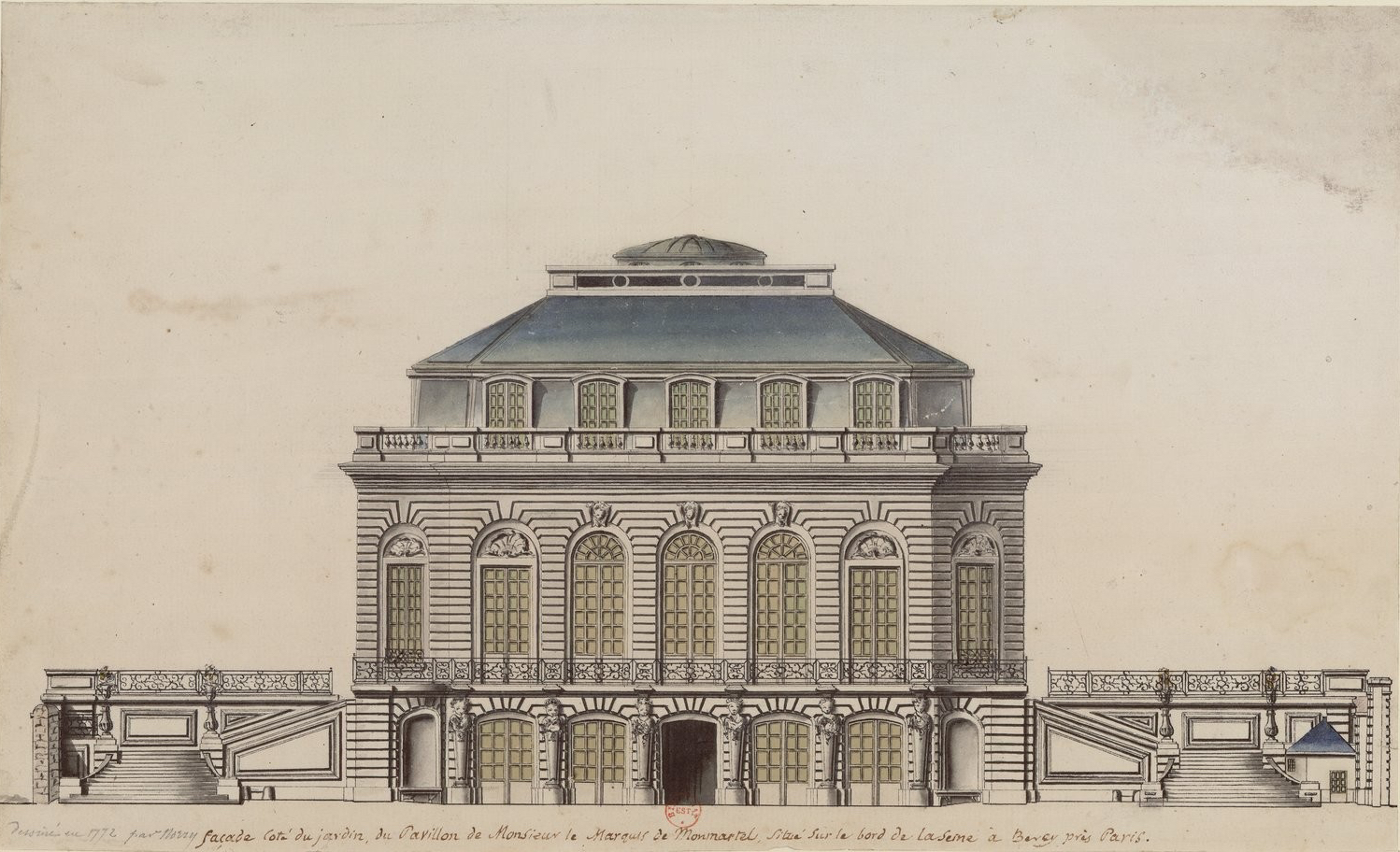
Pâté-Pâris

In 1706 he married Marie Élisabeth de La Roche. Testimony to her importance at the Court was that her marriage contract was co-signed by the Dauphin, the Duke of Burgundy and Marshal Villeroy.

One of the most prominent figures in the capital, Antoine Pâris acquired land in the vicinity of Bercy in 1711 where he erected a sumptuous residence known as "fr:Pâté-Pâris" or "Petit Bercy", as opposed to the castle known as "Grand Bercy". This building was immortalized by engravings made by Jean Mariette and offered to Antoine Pâris by the King of Poland Stanisław Leszczyński, future father-in-law of Louis XV.

The Pâris brothers had as protector and main support at court, the Duc de Beauvilliers, who was himself a friend of Fénelon and the Duke of Burgundy.

== State debt ==
On the death of Louis XIV, Antoine Pâris was associated by the Duke of Noailles with the settlement of the colossal debt of the State. Forcibly exiled for the first time in June 1720, Antoine Paris went to the County of Sampigny in Lorraine. When he moved with his people in his castle, the population of the village doubled.

John Law's bankruptcy saw Antoine find his way back to Versailles. It was at this time that he worked on the creation of a Paris Stock Exchange, which would not, however, see the light of day until a century later.

Called back to Paris in December 1720, the Pâris brothers were placed again at the head of the ferme générale. Antoine Pâris contributed with his brothers to the introduction of double-entry bookkeeping. From then on, he never left the halls of power. The liquidation of the debt by the operation of the visa in 1721 entrusts to the Pâris brothers an exorbitant power since with a stroke of the pen they could decide on the bankruptcy of an individual. The Visa Commission was responsible for reviewing requests for conversion into gold of the banknotes purchased by hundreds of thousands of savers, determining whether or not their behavior was dictated by speculation.

== New accusations and exile ==
Appointed Farmer General, and at the height of his career, he acquired in 1722 for one million livres the office of Guard of the Royal Treasury and was appointed State Councilor in 1724.

In 1723, the Pâris brothers became involved in a scandal that precipitated the fall of the Secretary of State for War Claude Le Blanc. The affair began with them conducting an investigation into the financial affairs of an ally of John Law, the Treasurer of the Extraordinary of Wars, fr:Gérard Michel de La Jonchère. The Pâris brothers accused him of embezzling 12 to 13 million livres, claiming that in 1720 they had given him cash to fund officers’ pay, but that he had kept the cash and distributed notes instead, pocketing the difference. La Jonchère was arrested and taken to the Bastille where he remained for several months, before eventually being acquitted. The Duke of Bourbon then stirred up a cabal against La Jonchère's patron, Claude Le Blanc, and accused him of having embezzled funds from the Ministry of War.

Antoine Pâris thus made powerful enemies who would eventually end his career. The enemies of the Pâris brothers accused them in 1725 of having, shipped large quantities of wheat abroad in 1722 and then brought it back into France to resell it there at an exorbitant price.

On June 11, 1726 Cardinal Fleury assumed control of the French government and the Pâris brothers were exiled again; they were deemed too powerful in Paris and suspected of operating a cartel over the grain market. Antoine was exiled to residence in Sampigny, he did not leave his lands in Lorraine, where he died at the age of 65 in his castle on July 29, 1733.

== See also ==
- Claude Pâris la Montagne
- Jean Pâris de Monmartel
- Joseph Paris Duverney
