= Claude Pâris la Montagne =

French banker and bibliophile

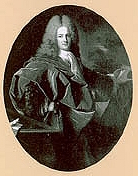
Claude Pâris la Montagne

Claude Pâris dit la Montagne (August 12, 1670, Moirans, Dauphiné - April 18, 1744, Serpaize), was a French banker and bibliophile, Lord of Moirans, Serpaize and Croix Fontaine. The suffix “La Montagne” comes from his mother Justine Trennanay La Montagne.

== Early life ==
Claude was the second of the four Pâris brothers, financiers during the reign of Louis XV. After studying law in Grenoble, he began his career by assisting his father Jean Pâris, a cereal merchant in Moirans, supplying grain to the army. In April 1691 he went to Lyon and asked the magistrates of the city to release the wheat kept in store so that he could send it to the army in Grenoble, promising to reimburse them when the spring thaw again made it possible to stock up in Burgundy again. He thus obtained six thousand sacks of wheat. He successively occupied the functions of director of food on behalf of the munitionnaire of the army of Italy (1692-1697), then of treasurer of the Extraordinary of Wars in the army of Flanders in 1707.

He left the Dauphiné for Paris in 1696 and after a difficult start managed to find a place among contractors to the armies. On January 14, 1708 he married Anne Elisabeth De La Roche, daughter of the commander of the Versailles park guards. Recognized for their skills, admired for their logistical operations and benefiting from the support of the comptroller general of finance Nicolas Desmarets, Claude and his brothers were now connected with the inner circles of power in France.

When Louis XIV died, the state coffers were empty. The Regent Philippe d'Orléans instructed the Paris brothers to operate the system known as the fr: Opération du visa. Thus was a systematic review of the finances of everyone who held government debt. The purpose was to tax any income that had previously escaped the attention of officials, and to persuade the holders of existing notes to exchange them for new credits on terms more favourable to the government. The first round of investigations ended in March 1717 and the Pâris brothers succeeded in increasing the government’s income from 1.8m livres per month to 5.5m livres.

== Success and exile ==
In 1718, Claude and his brothers acquired the lease of the Ferme générale. It was at this time that John Law entered the story. Benefiting from the support of Philippe d'Orléans, the Scot created the first general bank as well as the first paper currency. Relations between John Law and the Paris brothers deteriorated, because they openly criticized the speculative nature of Law's system. Law therefore persuaded the Regent to exile the four Paris brothers in June 1720.

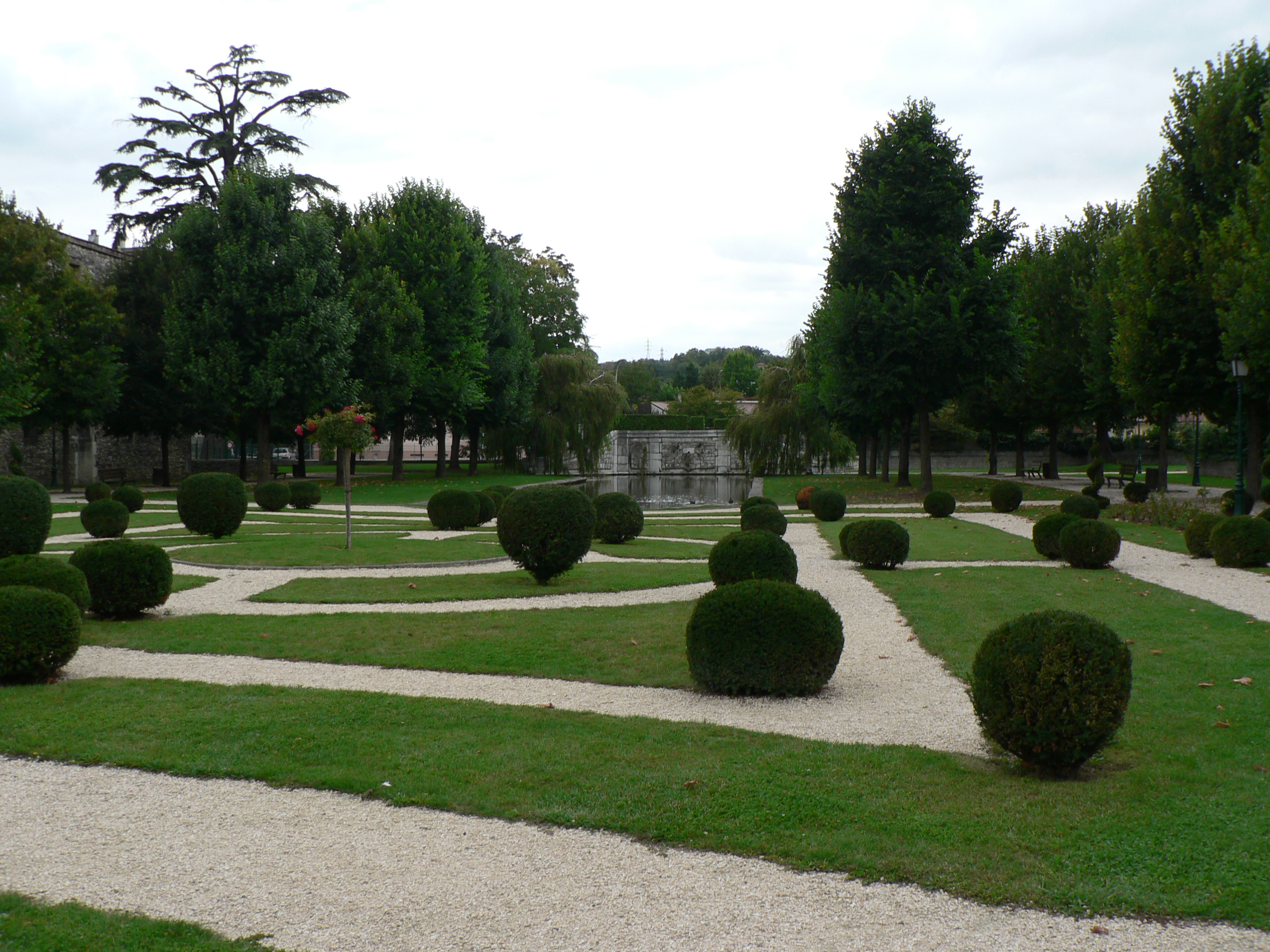
Moirans - Parc de la Grille

Claude returned to Moirans and took advantage of this stay to build his private mansion. The work was spread over a year and a half. When the construction was completed, Claude Paris set up a superb French-style garden opposite his residence, organized around a pond overlooked by a terrace with a horseshoe staircase. The ensemble has stood the test of time without too much damage, the garden is known today as the Parc de la Grille.

== Later life ==
John Law's experiments came to an end in December 1720. He was himself exiled and the new Comptroller General of Finance, Félix Le Pelletier de La Houssaye, hastened to recall Claude and his brothers to Paris. Tired of politics and the intrigues of Versailles, Claude Paris turned his back on the capital and preferred to devote himself to his native Dauphiné. Although he owned a castle in Croix Fontaine in the Paris region, he hardly stayed there and spent his time between his lands in Serpaize and his home in Moirans. In 1722 he acquired the position of Receiver General of Finances of Grenoble, which he kept until 1724.

In Paris, the position of the four brothers was strengthened with the end of the Regency. The Duke of Bourbon, then Prime Minister of Louis XV, held them in high esteem. However in a new twist on June 11, 1726, the adversaries of Paris come to power. The Duke of Bourbon is thanked and Claude and his brothers exiled again. After a brief stay in Sampigny with his brother Antoine, Claude returned to Dauphiné and never left.

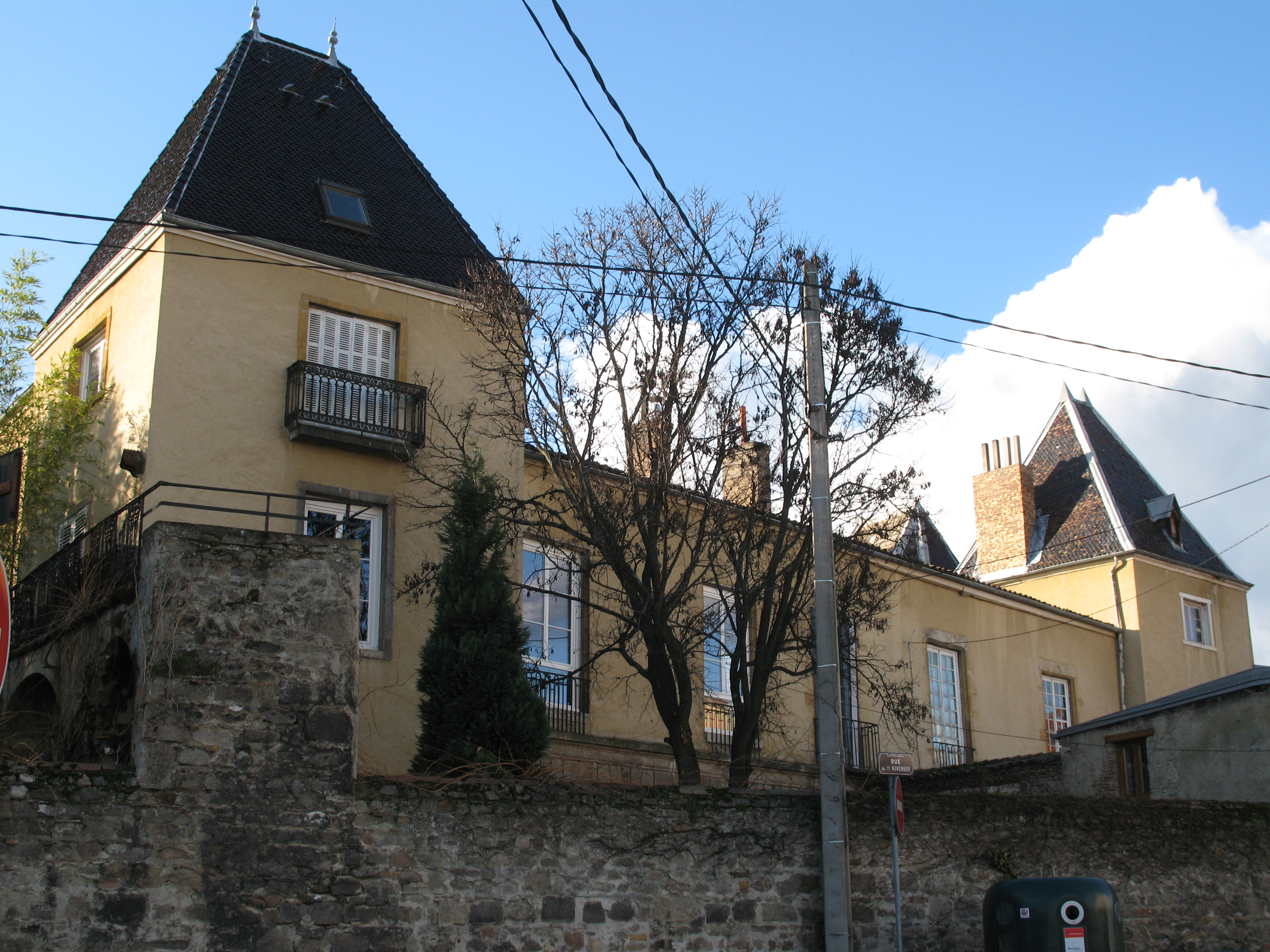
Château de La Tour (Saint-Genis-Laval)

In 1726, he added to his estates the castle of Meyzieu and that of La Tour in Saint-Genis-Laval, near Lyon. He then developed his extensive properties before dying on April 18, 1744 in his castle of Serpaize.

He was the most bibliophile of the Pâris brothers. He bequeathed his library of valuable books and manuscripts to his second son, Joseph Louis Pâris de Surieux (1714–1744), who died a few months after his father. His other son, Jean-Baptiste Pâris de Meyzieu (1718–1778), inherited the works. Claude Pâris' eldest son, Antoine Pâris d'Illins (1712–1777), had a son, fr:Antoine Marie Paris d'Illins (1746-1809), a soldier who had a castle in Villers-sur-Mer.

== See also ==
- Antoine Pâris
- Jean Pâris de Monmartel
- Joseph Paris Duverney
