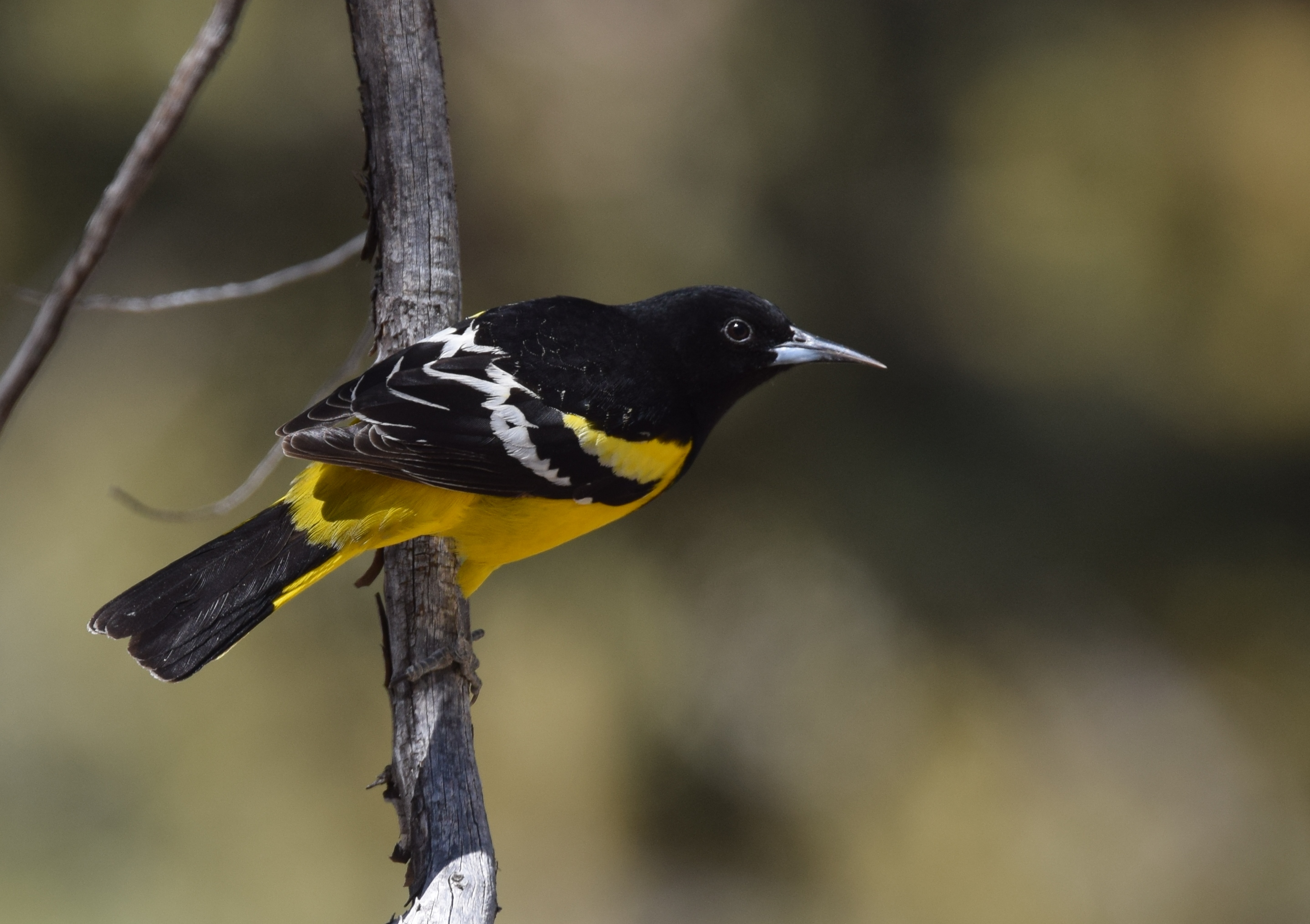

Conservation status
- Least Concern (IUCN 3.1)

Scientific classification
- Kingdom: Animalia
- Phylum: Chordata
- Class: Aves
- Order: Passeriformes
- Family: Icteridae
- Genus: Icterus
- Species: I. parisorum

Binomial name
- Icterus parisorum Bonaparte, 1838
- Breeding range in yellow, year-round range in green, non-breeding range in blue

= Scott's oriole =

Species of bird

Scott's oriole (Icterus parisorum) is a species of bird in the family Icteridae, the oropendolas, New World orioles, and New World blackbirds. It is found in Mexico and the United States.

== Taxonomy and systematics ==
Scott's oriole was formally described by French ornithologist Charles Lucien Bonaparte in 1838 with the binomial Icterus Parisorum [sic]. Bonaparte's specific epithet Parisorum (since uncapitalized) honors the Paris brothers, who had financed French natural history expeditions to the U. S. and Mexico. American soldier and naturalist Darius N. Couch named it Scott's oriole in honor of General Winfield Scott, without knowing that the bird had previously been described by Bonaparte.

There have been proposals to rename this species the yucca oriole to reflect its preferred habitat, and to address the negative historical connotations associated with its current namesake's involvement in the Trail of Tears and other episodes of ethnic cleansing in the Southeastern United States.

Scott's oriole is monotypic.

== Description ==
Scott's oriole is about 23 cm (9.1 in) long with a wingspan of 32 cm (13 in); it weighs 32 to 41 g (1.1 to 1.4 oz). Adult males in breeding plumage have a black head, back, scapulars, throat, and breast. Their rump, uppertail coverts, and underparts below the breast are lemon yellow. Their wings are black with pale yellow lesser and median coverts that show as an epaulet. The wing's greater coverts have white tips that show as a wing bar. Their tail feathers are mostly black with yellow bases and white tips, both of which are larger towards the outer feathers. Adult females have a grayish olive top of the head, back, scapulars, rump, and uppertail coverts. Most of these areas have darker streaks. Most individuals have a black chin, throat, and upper breast. The rest of their underpart are pale olive-yellow that is slightly more olive on their sides and flanks. Their wings are blackish brown with olive to yellowish edges on the lesser coverts. Their median and greater coverts have white tips that show as two wing bars. The wing's flight feathers have pale edges. Their tail feathers are mostly olive with progressively larger yellowish bases from the inner to the outer ones. Both sexes have a dark brown or black iris, a black or bluish black bill with a gray base to the mandible, and slate or grayish blue legs and feet.

== Distribution and habitat ==
Scott's oriole is found in the U. S. discontinuously in southern California. Its main range in the country is south of southern Utah (with "extensions" to northwestern Utah and northeastern Utah/northwestern Colorado), northwestern to southeastern New Mexico, and southwestern Texas with some gaps in Arizona and New Mexico. In Mexico it is found throughout the Baja California peninsula and in the mainland except coastally from the U. S. south to Oaxaca. The species has wandered as far north as Washington, Minnesota, and western Ontario. One individual spent from early December 2007 to early February 2008 in New York City's Union Square Park.

Scott's oriole primarily inhabits moderately elevated arid landscapes but shuns true deserts that lack trees. It is commonly found in pinyon–juniper woodland, pine-oak woodland, oak and other scrublands, and areas with yucca. In elevation it ranges from sea level to 3,000 m (9,800 ft).

== Behavior ==
=== Movement ===
Scott's oriole is a partial migrant. It is a year-round resident in the southern half of the Baja Peninsula and in mainland Mexico approximately from east-central Sinaloa to southern Nuevo León and south to the line Jalisco to Puebla. It breeds but does not overwinter from those areas to the northern limits of its range. There are also overwintering, but not breeding, populations in coastal west-central Mexico and in southern Mexico's Guerrero and Oaxaca that are apparently individuals that bred in the year-round range. Fall migration is concentrated between mid-August and mid-September and spring migration from early April to early May.

=== Feeding ===
Scott's oriole feeds primarily on adult and larval insects with smaller amounts of fruit and nectar and occasionally small vertebrates like lizards in its diet. it takes prey on the ground and in trees and other vegetation. It takes fruit from trees and cacti and nectar from plants and sugar water feeders. During the breeding season it forages singly, in pairs, and in family groups. In winter it often joins mixed-species feeding flocks.

=== Breeding ===
Scott's oriole breeds between mid-May and mid-August. Females build the nest, a hanging cup that in one study were woven from strips of yucca leaf lined with grass and seed fluff. Many nests are within about 3.5 m (10 ft) of the ground but have been found as high as 6.5 m (20 ft). Clutches range from one to five eggs with three being the most common number. They are usually pale blue with markings that can be from brownish gray to black. The female alone incubates; in one study the period was 11 to 15 days and fledging occurred about 14 days after hatch. Both parents provision nestlings.

=== Vocalization ===
The song of Scott's oriole is a "series of varied, short notes...; pure whistles (notes with a single dominant frequency) interspersed with notes that are rapidly modulated in frequency, some ascending, some descending, and some with both ascending and descending portions". Both sexes sing but female song is usually not as complex as male song. The species' calls include a repeated scolding "nasal chuck" and "a softer, quieter, nasal whine, huit". The species sings throughout the breeding season and throughout the day.

== Status ==
The IUCN has assessed Scott's oriole as being of Least Concern. It has an extremely large range; its estimated population of four million mature individuals is believed to be decreasing. No immediate threats have been identified. Scott's orioles "tend to be uncommon" in the U. S.
