= Jean Pâris de Monmartel =

French financier

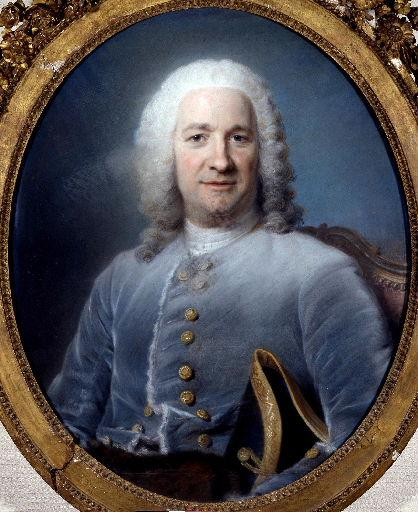
Portrait of Jean Pâris de Montmartel, by Maurice Quentin de La Tour. 1746

Jean Pâris de Monmartel (3 August 1690 at Moirans, Dauphiné – 10 September 1766 at his château at Brunoy) was a French financier. He was the youngest of the four Pâris brothers, who were financiers under Louis XIV and Louis XV. At the height of his fortunes he had 370,000 livres invested in the powerful Société d'Angola, set up to deal in the Atlantic slave trade, managed by Antoine Walsh, the richest and most famous of the Irish of Nantes.

He held a number of titles: marquis of Brunoy, count of Sampigny, baron Dagouville, count of Châteaumeillant, d'Argenton et Veuil d'Argenson, viscount de la Motte Feuilly, baron Saint-Jeanvrin, Saligny et Marigny, seigneur of Villers-sur-Mer, Chateauneuf, La Chétardie, Varenne, Lamotte-Glauville, Bourgeauville, Drubec, des Humières, Le Donjon, La Forest les Dureaux, Lamirande, Lachetardie, and other places.

== Early life ==
The suffix "Monmartel" comes from an estate at Moirans, spelled "Montmartel", acquired by his father, which included the inn the family ran. The inn stood on the route taken by supply trains for the French army in Italy; in 1693 the Pâris boys acted as guides for the army suppliers, in whose Paris offices they eventually went to work. Jean spent his early years at Moirans in the family business, and was a soldier for a time before joining his older brothers Antoine and Claude in Paris. There he benefited from the valuable network of contacts they had built up, which enabled him in his turn to begin ascending the ladder of society: as early as 1704 he had been made Intendant General of the Army of Flanders. The grain trade was particularly profitable at this time, when transport was primitive, and where the slightest shortage sent prices soaring, benefitting whoever had the means of managing large volumes of stock.

He was made War Commissar in 1709, under Louis XIV, and he bought the post of Treasurer of the Ponts et Chaussées in 1715. He was involved in the opération du visa in 1716 - the systematic management of payments to government bondholders, his first venture into the world of finance. Exiled in 1720 along with his brothers, he remained away from Paris until the end of December. The large amounts of money he had made, along with his brothers, trading in military supplies and in wholesale commerce, allowed him to purchase the lordship of Brunoy, with its château, in 1722. Shortly before this, in 1721, one of his friends, François Poisson, asked him to act as godfather for his newborn daughter. He chose her names, Jeanne-Antoinette, and she was later to become Madame de Pompadour.

== Lord of Brunoy ==
Considered to be the richest man in the kingdom after Louis XV, he was responsible for the masterpiece of 18th century landscape architecture - the "Great Waters of Brunoy" – which he wished to be as grandiose as those of Versailles - issuing from the forest of Yerres thanks to a system of pumps, and flowing down the slopes of the plateau of the Forest of Sénart. The park consisted of a series of basins, with great banks of flowers, statues, a long canal and a waterfall, powered by a machine created by Laurent. The result was widely praised, and Brunoy became the favourite place for Madame de Pompadour, Voltaire, and Foreign Minister Choiseul to visit.

== Fall and return ==
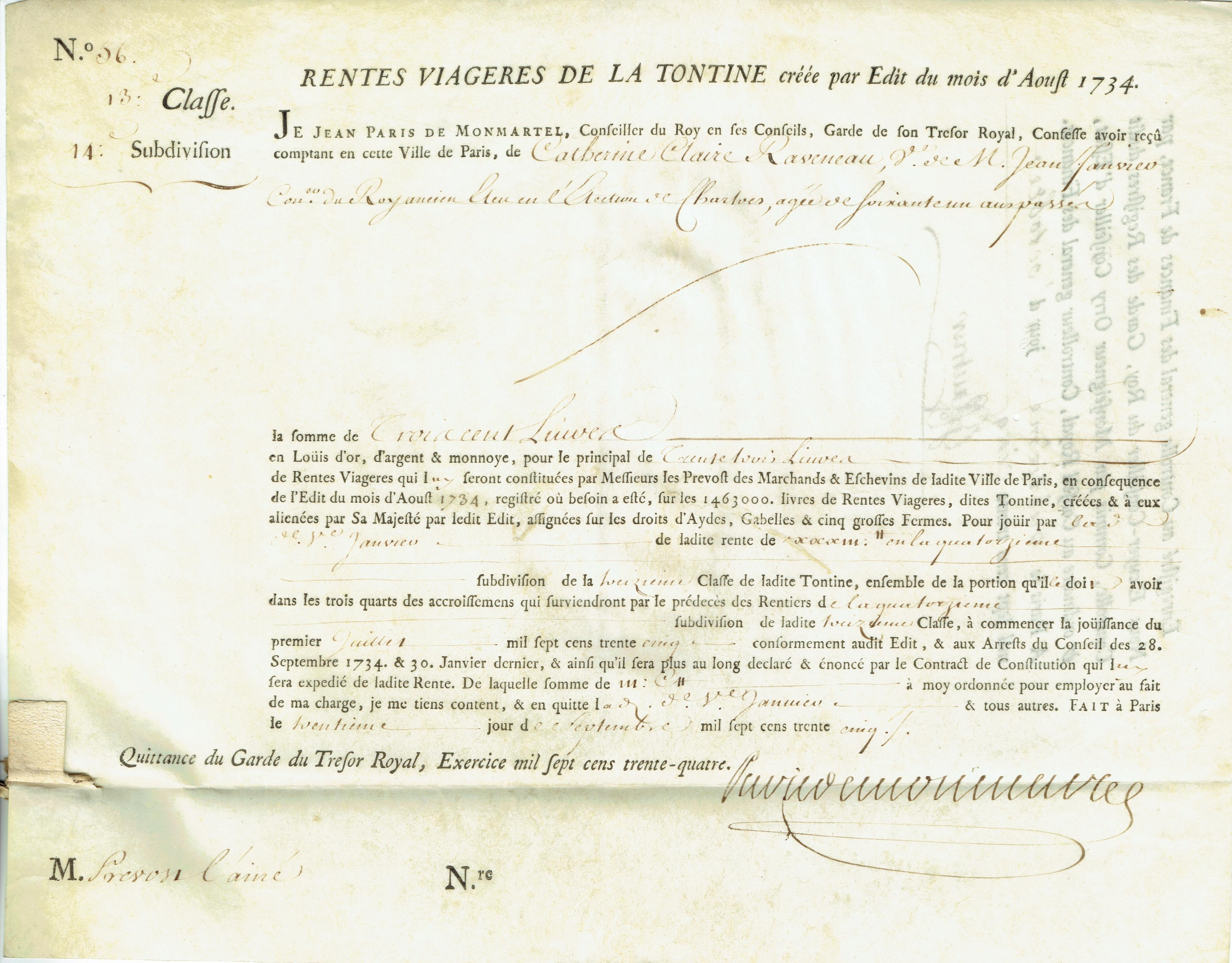
Rente viagère from 1735, issued by Jean Pâris de Monmartel as Warden of the Royal Trasury

The bankruptcy of John Law meant that the Paris brothers were recalled from exile, and the Regent Orleans entrusted them with the operation du visa, aiming to restore confidence in France's shattered finances. Their position was strengthened in 1723 after the death of the Regent. In 1724 Jean Paris de Monmartel acquired the post of Guard of the Royal Treasury. This capture of the finances of the realm, and a self-enrichment considered by some to be much too rapid, reinforced the rancour of many of France's nobles towards them, as well as of many commoners. In a palace revolution on 11 June 1726, they were ejected from power and exiled once again. Paris de Monmartel spent some time at Saumur, before moving on to Sampigny and eventually returning to Brunoy. The disastrous state of the country’s finances impelled the new First Minister, Cardinal Fleury, to recall Jean Paris to Versailles in 1730. Jean and his brother Joseph also took advantage of another favourable circumstance to move closer to the centre of power – the death of Fleury and the arrival at court of Madame de Pompadour.

== Court banker and powerbroker ==
Jeanne Antoinette Poisson, Marquise de Pompadour was the goddaughter of Jean Paris de Monmartel. Her father had worked as a clerk to the Paris brothers, and this special relationship allowed him to gradually take control over the key areas of the country's policy. The Ministries of Finance, War and Foreign Affairs were indirectly controlled by Paris de Monmartel and his brother Paris Duverney. Saint Simon wrote in his Mémoires: "They (the Paris brothers) have once again become the masters of finance and the whole Court is at their feet."

As banker to the court from 1740 and then State Counsellor from 1755, his influence was significant. The Maréchal de Saxe wrote of Monmartel and his brother Duverney: "These are two people who do not wish to appear and who, fundamentally, are very strong in this country because they keep the entire machine running. They are always my intimate friends, and they are the most honest of people and the most upstanding citizens." The Foreign Minister Abbé de Bernis wrote in 1758: "We are dependent on Monmartel…. If you ignore this man, bankruptcy follows." Paris de Monmartel remained the court banker until 1759, when he handed the role over to Jean-Joseph de Laborde.

== Family ==
Paris Monmartel married three times: first, in 1720, to Marguerite Françoise Mégret (1704-1720), daughter of François-Nicolas Mégret d’Étigny, who had also made his fortune in the wheat trade; then in 1724 to his niece Antoinette Justine Paris (d.1739). His third marriage (1746) was to Marie Armande de Béthune (1709 – 1772), sister of the Marquis of Béthune.

His son Armand-Louis Joseph Paris de Monmartel (1748–81), State Counsellor, Grand Master of the Hotel of the King, Marquis de Brunoy, ceded his chateau to the Comte de Provence after running up debts. In 1767 Armand-Louis married Jeanne de Pérusse d'Escars (1745-1823) from whom he quickly separated, without issue.

== See also ==
- Antoine Pâris
- Claude Pâris la Montagne
- Joseph Paris Duverney
- Atlantic history
- Triangular trade
- History of slavery

== Sources ==
- Association Moirans de Tout Temps, exposition sur les Frères Paris réalisée en 2003,
- Publications de la S.A.H.A.V.Y. (Société d'Art, Histoire et Archéologie de la Vallée de l'Yerres),
- En Dauphiné la jeunesse d'un grand financier » by Jean-Luc Cartannaz, article published in «Le Monmartel» no 33, December 2006 edited by the S.A.H.A.V.Y (Société d'Art, Histoire et Archéologie de la Vallée de l'Yerres)
- Marc Cheynet de Beaupré, 'Joseph Paris Duverney, financier d'État (1684-1770) - Ascension et pouvoir au Siècle des Lumières' doctoral thesis in history, Université Paris I Panthéon-Sorbonne, 2010
- Pierre-Augustin Caron de Beaumarchais, « Le Tartare à la Légion », Édition établie, ed. Marc Cheynet de Beaupré, Bordeaux, Le Castor Astral, Collection « Les Inattendus », 1998
- Irène de Château-Thierry « Hôtel Monmartel, la demeure parisienne d'un grand financier », Account of research at École du Louvre, 1993-1998
- Robert Dubois-Corneau « Jean Paris de Monmartel, Banquier de la Cour », Librairie E. Jean-Fontaine, Paris, 1917
