= Montaud, Isère =

Montaud
- Commune
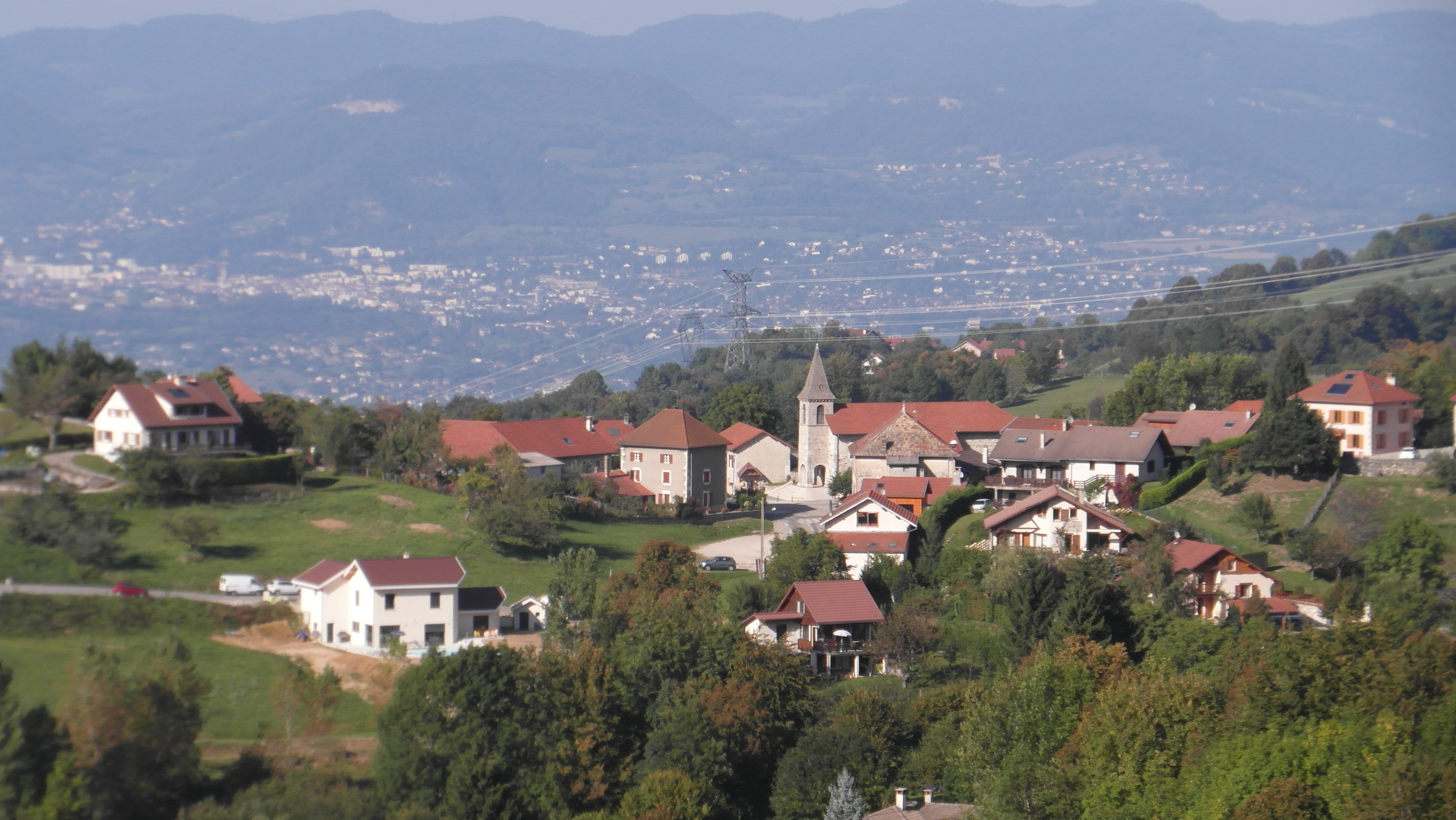
- A general view of Montaud
- Location of Montaud
- Location within France Location within Auvergne-Rhône-Alpes
- Coordinates: 45°15′49″N 5°33′42″E
- Country: France
- Region: Auvergne-Rhône-Alpes
- Department: Isère
- Arrondissement: Grenoble
- Canton: Tullins
- Intercommunality: Saint-Marcellin Vercors Isère

Government
  - Mayor (2020–2026): Francis Colin
- Area^{1}: 14.59 km^{2} (5.63 sq mi)
- Elevation: 730 m (2,400 ft)
- Highest elevation: 1,643 m (5,390 ft)
- Lowest elevation: 400 m (1,300 ft)
- Population (2023): 530
  - Density: 36/km^{2} (94/sq mi)
- Time zone: UTC+01:00 (CET)
  - Summer (DST): UTC+02:00 (CEST)
- INSEE/Postal code: 38248 /38210
- ^{1} French Land Register data, which excludes lakes, ponds, glaciers > 1 km^{2} (0.386 sq mi or 247 acres) and river estuaries.

Montaud (French pronunciation: [mɔ̃to]) is a commune in the Isère department in southeastern France.

== Population ==
Historical population
Year	Pop.	±% p.a.
1968	179	—
1975	171	−0.65%
1982	254	+5.82%
1990	308	+2.44%
1999	383	+2.45%
2007	538	+4.34%
2012	533	−0.19%
2017	543	+0.37%
2023	530	−0.40%
Source: INSEE

== See also ==
- Communes of the Isère department
- Parc naturel régional du Vercors
