= Réaumont =

- Commune
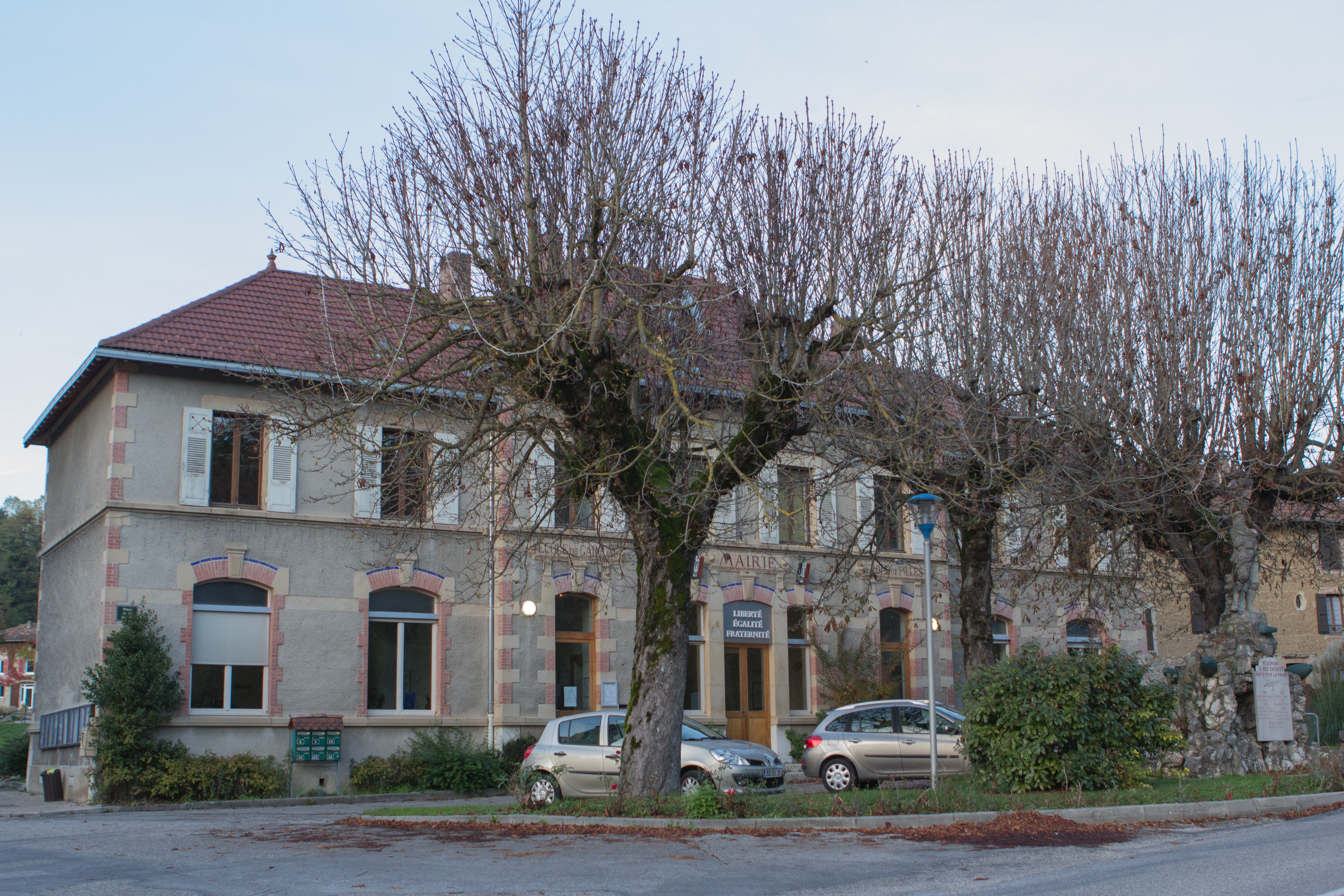
- The town hall of Réaumont
- Location of Réaumont
- Location within France Location within Auvergne-Rhône-Alpes
- Coordinates: 45°22′14″N 5°31′36″E
- Country: France
- Region: Auvergne-Rhône-Alpes
- Department: Isère
- Arrondissement: Grenoble
- Canton: Tullins
- Intercommunality: CA Pays Voironnais

Government
  - Mayor (2020–2026): Patrick Morel
- Area^{1}: 4.95 km^{2} (1.91 sq mi)
- Elevation: 328 m (1,076 ft)
- Highest elevation: 436 m (1,430 ft)
- Lowest elevation: 309 m (1,014 ft)
- Population (2023): 1,019
  - Density: 206/km^{2} (533/sq mi)
- Time zone: UTC+01:00 (CET)
  - Summer (DST): UTC+02:00 (CEST)
- INSEE/Postal code: 38331 /38140
- ^{1} French Land Register data, which excludes lakes, ponds, glaciers > 1 km^{2} (0.386 sq mi or 247 acres) and river estuaries.

Réaumont (French pronunciation: [ʁeomˈɔ̃]) is a commune in the Isère department in southeastern France.

== Population ==
Historical population
Year	Pop.	±% p.a.
1968	357	—
1975	371	+0.55%
1982	501	+4.38%
1990	634	+2.99%
1999	791	+2.49%
2007	886	+1.43%
2012	1,000	+2.45%
2017	1,021	+0.42%
2023	1,019	−0.03%
Source: INSEE

== See also ==
- Communes of the Isère department
