= Serpaize =

- Commune
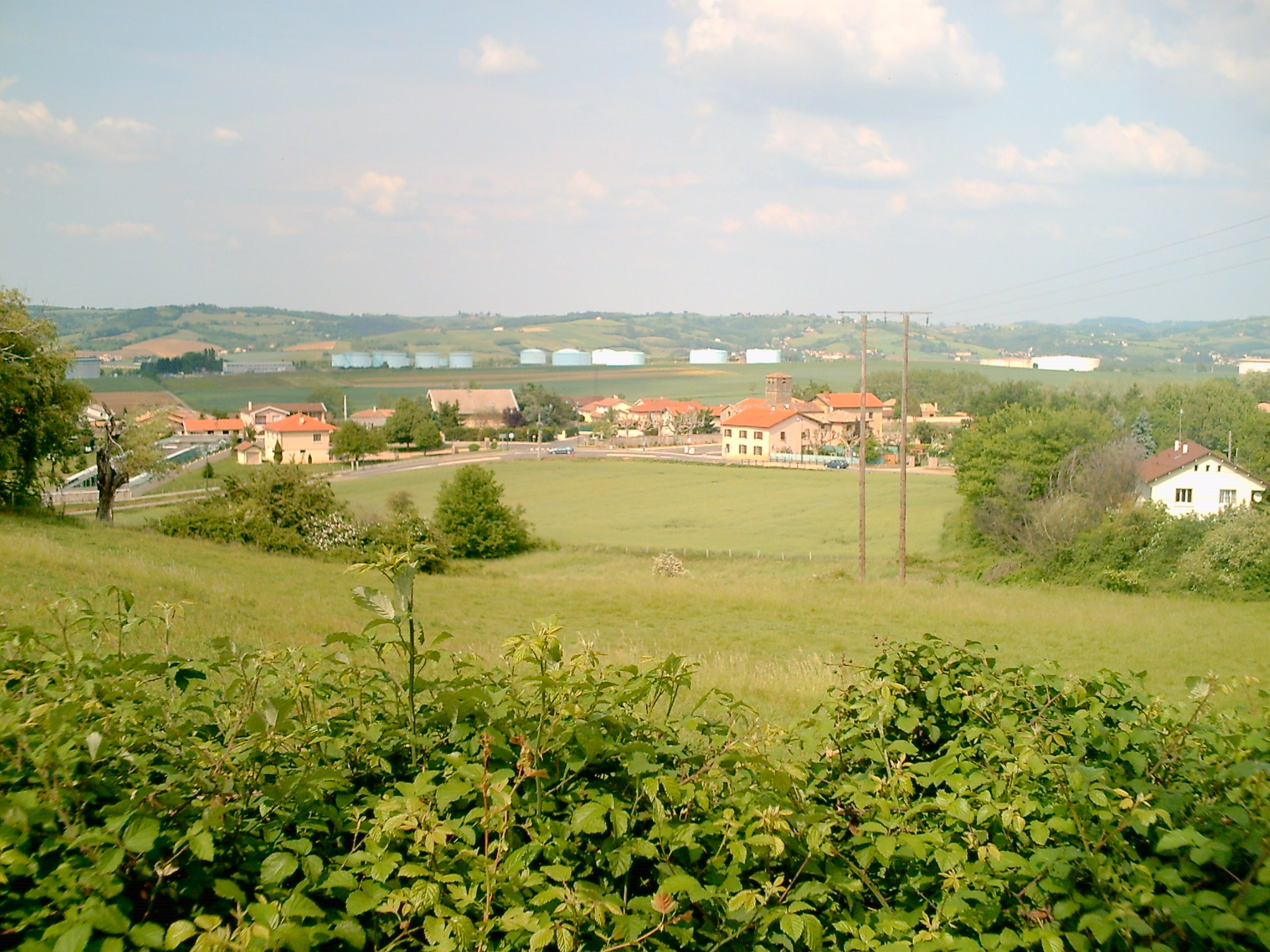
- A general view of Serpaize
- Location of Serpaize
- Location within France Location within Auvergne-Rhône-Alpes
- Coordinates: 45°33′35″N 4°55′07″E
- Country: France
- Region: Auvergne-Rhône-Alpes
- Department: Isère
- Arrondissement: Vienne
- Canton: Vienne-1
- Intercommunality: CA Vienne Condrieu

Government
  - Mayor (2020–2026): Max Kechichian
- Area^{1}: 11.71 km^{2} (4.52 sq mi)
- Highest elevation: 324 m (1,063 ft)
- Lowest elevation: 190 m (620 ft)
- Population (2023): 2,091
  - Density: 178.6/km^{2} (462.5/sq mi)
- Time zone: UTC+01:00 (CET)
  - Summer (DST): UTC+02:00 (CEST)
- INSEE/Postal code: 38484 /38200
- Website: Serpaize.com
- ^{1} French Land Register data, which excludes lakes, ponds, glaciers > 1 km^{2} (0.386 sq mi or 247 acres) and river estuaries.

Serpaize (French pronunciation: [sɛʁpɛz]) is a commune in the Isère department in southeastern France.

== Population ==
Historical population

Year	Pop.	±% p.a.
1931	413	—
1936	386	−1.34%
1946	362	−0.64%
1954	418	+1.81%
1962	443	+0.73%
1968	393	−1.98%
1975	479	+2.87%

Year	Pop.	±% p.a.
1982	950	+10.28%
1990	1,159	+2.52%
1999	1,240	+0.75%
2007	1,419	+1.70%
2012	1,564	+1.96%
2017	1,939	+4.39%
2023	2,091	+1.27%

Source: EHESS and INSEE (1968-2023)

== See also ==
- Communes of the Isère department
- Claude Pâris la Montagne
