= Charnècles =

- Commune
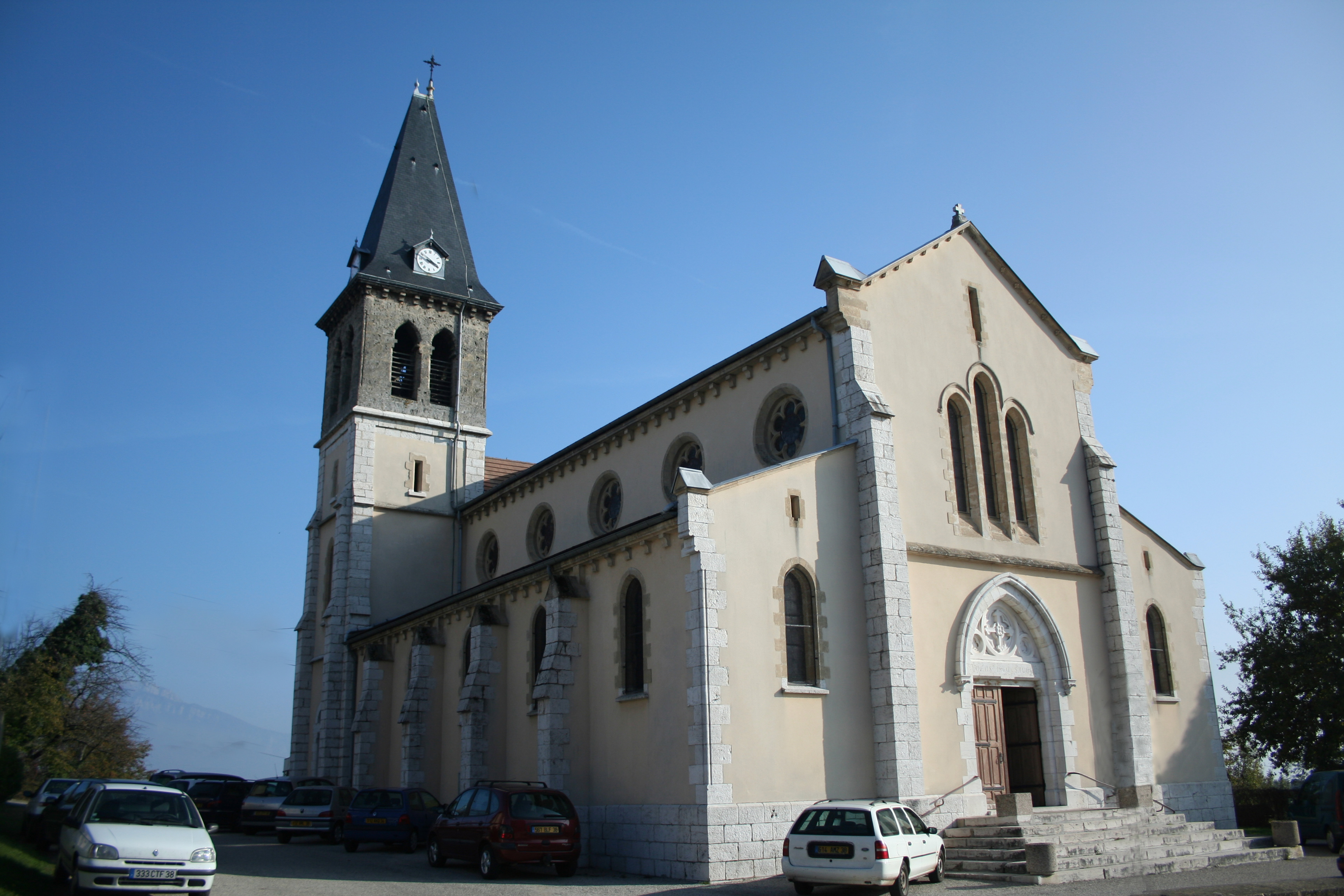
- The church of Saint-Roch
- Location of Charnècles
- Location within France Location within Auvergne-Rhône-Alpes
- Coordinates: 45°20′39″N 5°31′43″E
- Country: France
- Region: Auvergne-Rhône-Alpes
- Department: Isère
- Arrondissement: Grenoble
- Canton: Tullins
- Intercommunality: CA Pays Voironnais

Government
  - Mayor (2020–2026): Nadine Reux
- Area^{1}: 5.23 km^{2} (2.02 sq mi)
- Elevation: 375 m (1,230 ft)
- Highest elevation: 405 m (1,329 ft)
- Lowest elevation: 260 m (850 ft)
- Population (2023): 1,517
  - Density: 290/km^{2} (751/sq mi)
- Time zone: UTC+01:00 (CET)
  - Summer (DST): UTC+02:00 (CEST)
- INSEE/Postal code: 38084 /38140
- ^{1} French Land Register data, which excludes lakes, ponds, glaciers > 1 km^{2} (0.386 sq mi or 247 acres) and river estuaries.

Charnècles (French pronunciation: [ʃaʁnɛkl]) is a commune in the Isère department in southeastern France.

== Population ==
Historical population
Year	Pop.	±% p.a.
1968	579	—
1975	644	+1.53%
1982	858	+4.18%
1990	1,044	+2.48%
1999	1,363	+3.01%
2007	1,448	+0.76%
2012	1,496	+0.65%
2017	1,438	−0.79%
2023	1,517	+0.90%
Source: INSEE

== See also ==
- Communes of the Isère department
