= Poliénas =

- Commune
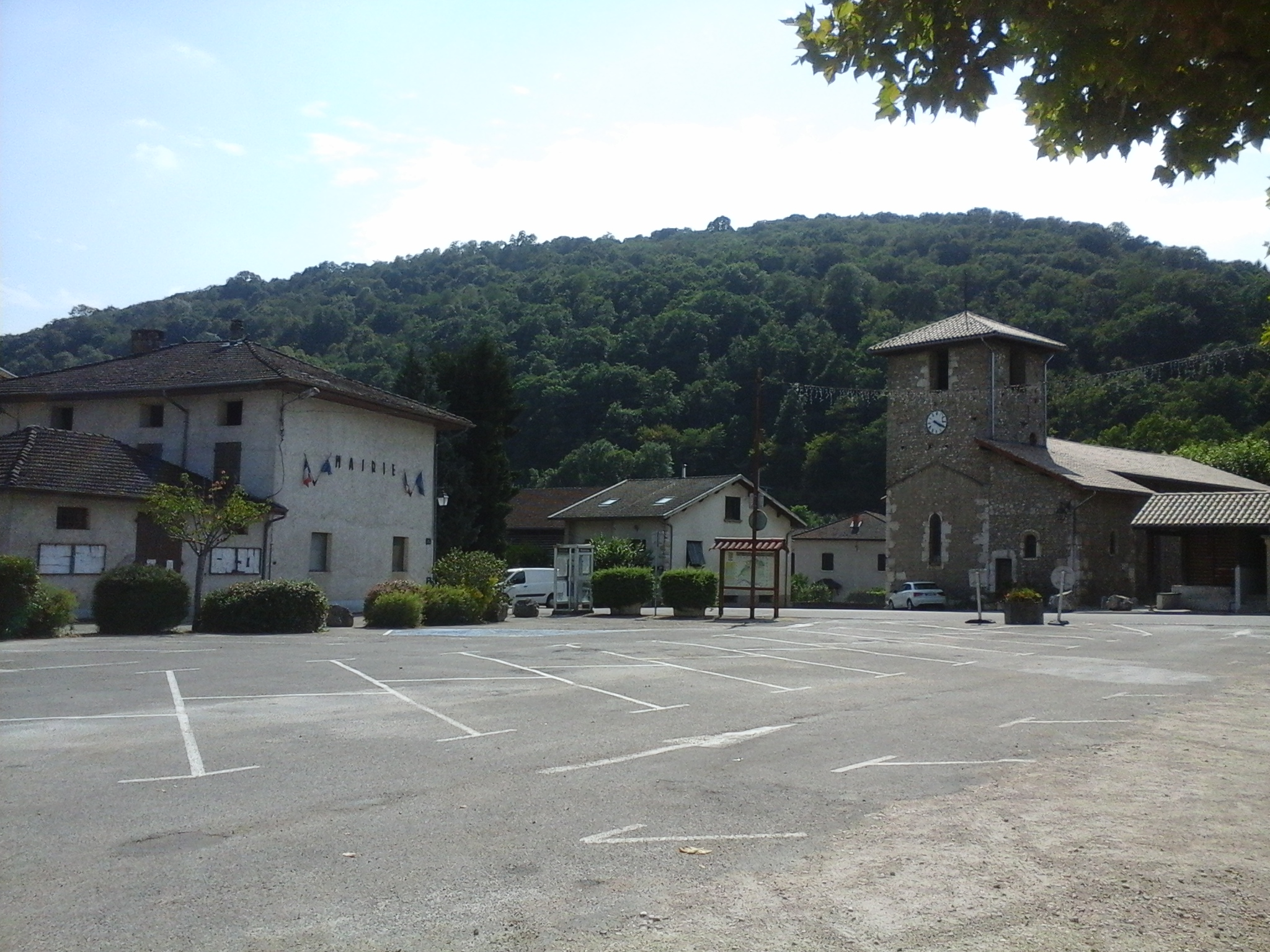
- The village square, Poliénas

- Coat of arms
- Location of Poliénas
- Location within France Location within Auvergne-Rhône-Alpes
- Coordinates: 45°14′59″N 5°28′19″E
- Country: France
- Region: Auvergne-Rhône-Alpes
- Department: Isère
- Arrondissement: Grenoble
- Canton: Tullins

Government
  - Mayor (2023–2026): Lionel Argoud
- Area^{1}: 14.03 km^{2} (5.42 sq mi)
- Highest elevation: 409 m (1,342 ft)
- Lowest elevation: 178 m (584 ft)
- Population (2023): 1,111
  - Density: 79.19/km^{2} (205.1/sq mi)
- Time zone: UTC+01:00 (CET)
  - Summer (DST): UTC+02:00 (CEST)
- INSEE/Postal code: 38310 /38210
- ^{1} French Land Register data, which excludes lakes, ponds, glaciers > 1 km^{2} (0.386 sq mi or 247 acres) and river estuaries.

Poliénas is a commune in the Isère department in southeastern France.

== Population ==
Historical population
Year	Pop.	±% p.a.
1968	644	—
1975	605	−0.89%
1982	737	+2.86%
1990	908	+2.64%
1999	917	+0.11%
2007	1,076	+2.02%
2012	1,092	+0.30%
2017	1,188	+1.70%
2023	1,111	−1.11%
Source: INSEE

== See also ==
- Communes of the Isère department
