= Renage =

- Commune
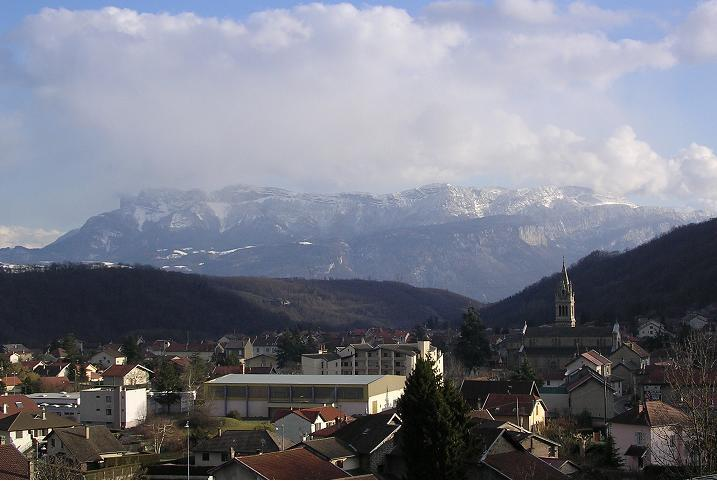
- The centre of Renage

- Coat of arms
- Location of Renage
- Location within France Location within Auvergne-Rhône-Alpes
- Coordinates: 45°20′03″N 5°29′10″E
- Country: France
- Region: Auvergne-Rhône-Alpes
- Department: Isère
- Arrondissement: Grenoble
- Canton: Tullins
- Intercommunality: Bièvre Est

Government
  - Mayor (2020–2026): Amélie Girerd
- Area^{1}: 5.1 km^{2} (2.0 sq mi)
- Highest elevation: 464 m (1,522 ft)
- Lowest elevation: 229 m (751 ft)
- Population (2023): 3,348
  - Density: 660/km^{2} (1,700/sq mi)
- Time zone: UTC+01:00 (CET)
  - Summer (DST): UTC+02:00 (CEST)
- INSEE/Postal code: 38332 /38140
- ^{1} French Land Register data, which excludes lakes, ponds, glaciers > 1 km^{2} (0.386 sq mi or 247 acres) and river estuaries.

Renage (French pronunciation: [ʁənaʒ]) is a commune in the Isère department in southeastern France.

== Population ==
Historical population

Year	Pop.	±% p.a.
1793	1,049	—
1800	1,122	+0.97%
1806	1,146	+0.35%
1821	1,094	−0.31%
1831	1,204	+0.96%
1836	1,363	+2.51%
1841	1,494	+1.85%
1846	1,590	+1.25%
1851	1,630	+0.50%
1856	1,605	−0.31%
1861	1,700	+1.16%
1866	1,870	+1.92%
1872	1,830	−0.36%
1876	1,860	+0.41%
1881	2,173	+3.16%
1886	2,326	+1.37%
1891	2,330	+0.03%
1896	2,277	−0.46%
1901	2,305	+0.24%

Year	Pop.	±% p.a.
1906	2,507	+1.69%
1911	2,511	+0.03%
1921	2,393	−0.48%
1926	2,651	+2.07%
1931	2,468	−1.42%
1936	2,148	−2.74%
1946	2,004	−0.69%
1954	2,314	+1.81%
1962	2,708	+1.98%
1968	3,000	+1.72%
1975	3,055	+0.26%
1982	3,115	+0.28%
1990	3,277	+0.64%
1999	3,291	+0.05%
2007	3,596	+1.11%
2012	3,602	+0.03%
2017	3,464	−0.78%
2023	3,348	−0.57%

Source: EHESS and INSEE (1968-2023)

== See also ==
- Communes of the Isère department
