= Saint-Blaise-du-Buis =

- Commune
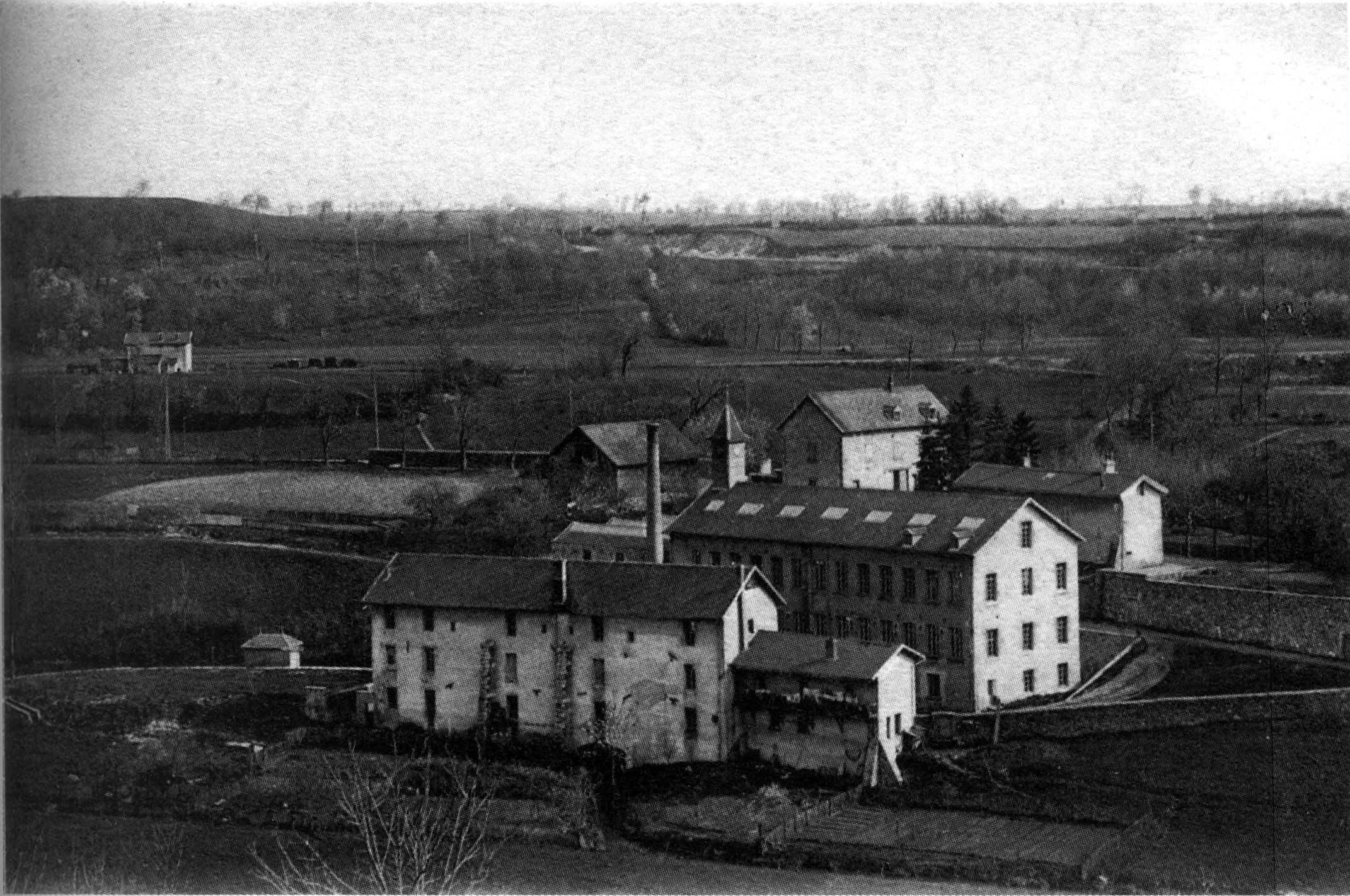
- Saint-Blaise-du-Buis in 1908
- Location of Saint-Blaise-du-Buis
- Location within France Location within Auvergne-Rhône-Alpes
- Coordinates: 45°22′39″N 5°31′09″E
- Country: France
- Region: Auvergne-Rhône-Alpes
- Department: Isère
- Arrondissement: Grenoble
- Canton: Tullins
- Intercommunality: CA Pays Voironnais

Government
  - Mayor (2020–2026): Nathalie Faure
- Area^{1}: 5.44 km^{2} (2.10 sq mi)
- Highest elevation: 492 m (1,614 ft)
- Lowest elevation: 372 m (1,220 ft)
- Population (2023): 1,062
  - Density: 195/km^{2} (506/sq mi)
- Time zone: UTC+01:00 (CET)
  - Summer (DST): UTC+02:00 (CEST)
- INSEE/Postal code: 38368 /38140
- ^{1} French Land Register data, which excludes lakes, ponds, glaciers > 1 km^{2} (0.386 sq mi or 247 acres) and river estuaries.

Saint-Blaise-du-Buis (French pronunciation: [sɛ̃ blɛz dy bɥi]) is a commune in the Isère department in southeastern France.

== Population ==
Historical population
Year	Pop.	±% p.a.
1968	379	—
1975	556	+5.63%
1982	738	+4.13%
1990	826	+1.42%
1999	853	+0.36%
2007	987	+1.84%
2012	996	+0.18%
2017	1,062	+1.29%
2023	1,062	+0.00%
Source: INSEE

== See also ==
- Communes of the Isère department
