= Saint-Quentin-sur-Isère =

- Commune
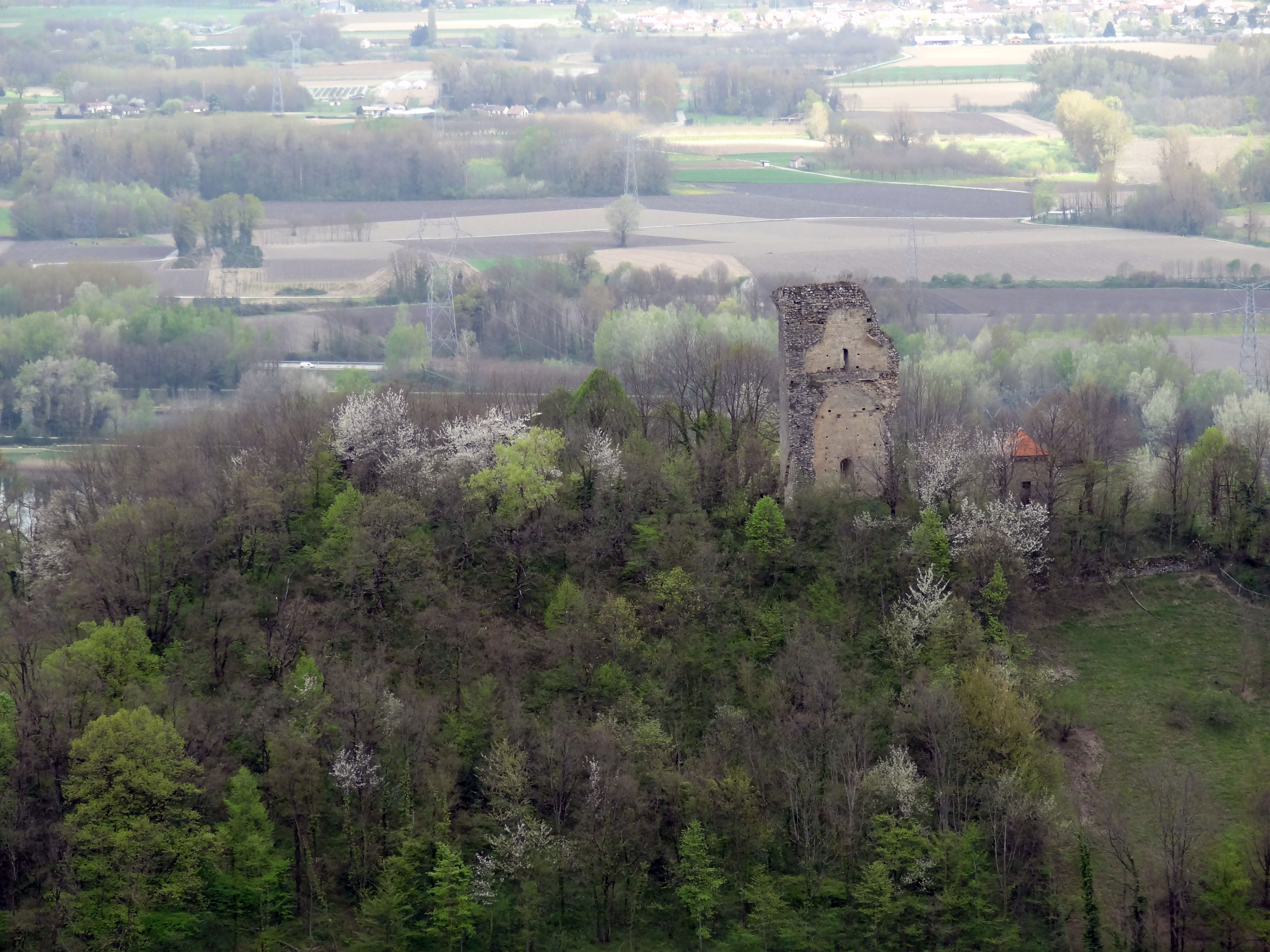
- Chateau

- Coat of arms
- Location of Saint-Quentin-sur-Isère
- Location within France Location within Auvergne-Rhône-Alpes
- Coordinates: 45°16′48″N 5°32′34″E
- Country: France
- Region: Auvergne-Rhône-Alpes
- Department: Isère
- Arrondissement: Grenoble
- Canton: Tullins

Government
  - Mayor (2020–2026): Jean-Pierre Faure
- Area^{1}: 19.45 km^{2} (7.51 sq mi)
- Elevation: 262 m (860 ft)
- Highest elevation: 1,008 m (3,307 ft)
- Lowest elevation: 176 m (577 ft)
- Population (2023): 1,466
  - Density: 75.37/km^{2} (195.2/sq mi)
- Time zone: UTC+01:00 (CET)
  - Summer (DST): UTC+02:00 (CEST)
- INSEE/Postal code: 38450 /38210
- ^{1} French Land Register data, which excludes lakes, ponds, glaciers > 1 km^{2} (0.386 sq mi or 247 acres) and river estuaries.

Saint-Quentin-sur-Isère (French pronunciation: [sɛ̃ kɑ̃tɛ̃ syʁ izɛʁ], literally Saint-Quentin on Isère) is a commune in the Isère department in southeastern France.

== Population ==
Historical population
Year	Pop.	±% p.a.
1968	722	—
1975	783	+1.17%
1982	937	+2.60%
1990	1,090	+1.91%
1999	1,231	+1.36%
2007	1,288	+0.57%
2012	1,330	+0.64%
2017	1,451	+1.76%
2023	1,466	+0.17%
Source: INSEE

== See also ==
- Communes of the Isère department
- Parc naturel régional du Vercors
