= Jean-Baptiste Pâris de Meyzieu =

Jean-Baptiste Paris de Meyzieu (16 May 1718 – 6 September 1778, Paris) was an 18th-century French bibliophile and a member of the rich family of the Pâris brothers

== Biography ==
The son of Claude Pâris la Montagne (1670–1745) and Elisabeth de la Roche, he was the penultimate of their children and had four brothers and one sister: Claude Geoffroy Paris (1709-?), Antoine Paris d'Illins (?-?), Pierre Paris de la Tour (1713–1730), Anne-Emilie Paris la Montagne (1716-?) and François Joseph Paris de Moirans (1719–1744). He was the nephew of financier Joseph Paris Duverney.

Jean-Baptiste Pâris Meyzieu left the service with the rank of lieutenant colonel and obtained the survival of the post of intendant of the École royale militaire, a position occupied by his uncle Joseph Paris Duverney (one of the instigators of the creation of this establishment in 1751).

He published a Lettre about this institution and provided the Encyclopédie by Diderot and D’Alembert an article related to schools.

To him is attributed le Tremblement de terre de Lisbonne, a play, according to Abbot Laporte, he would have written with Du Coin, his secretary.

A former adviser to Parlement, he had assembled a library whose catalog was printed in Paris in 1779, in-8°. According to Gabriel Peignot, the famous library was auctioned in London in 1791 for 54,000 pounds. The catalog, that he presumably established himself, was published under the title Bibliotheca elegantissima Parisina.

He maintained a friendly relationship with Pierre Beaumarchais.

== Sources ==
- Ferdinand Hoefer, Nouvelle Biographie générale, t. 39, Paris, Firmin-Didot, 1862, (p. 208).
