= Canton of Tullins =

Coordinates: 45.30°N 5.48°E

The canton of Tullins is an administrative division of the Isère department, eastern France. Its borders were modified at the French canton reorganisation which came into effect in March 2015. Its seat is in Tullins.

It consists of the following communes:

1. Beaucroissant
2. Charnècles
3. Moirans
4. Montaud
5. Poliénas
6. Réaumont
7. Renage
8. Rives
9. Saint-Blaise-du-Buis
10. Saint-Jean-de-Moirans
11. Saint-Quentin-sur-Isère
12. Tullins
13. Vourey
