= Rives, Isère =

Rives
- Commune
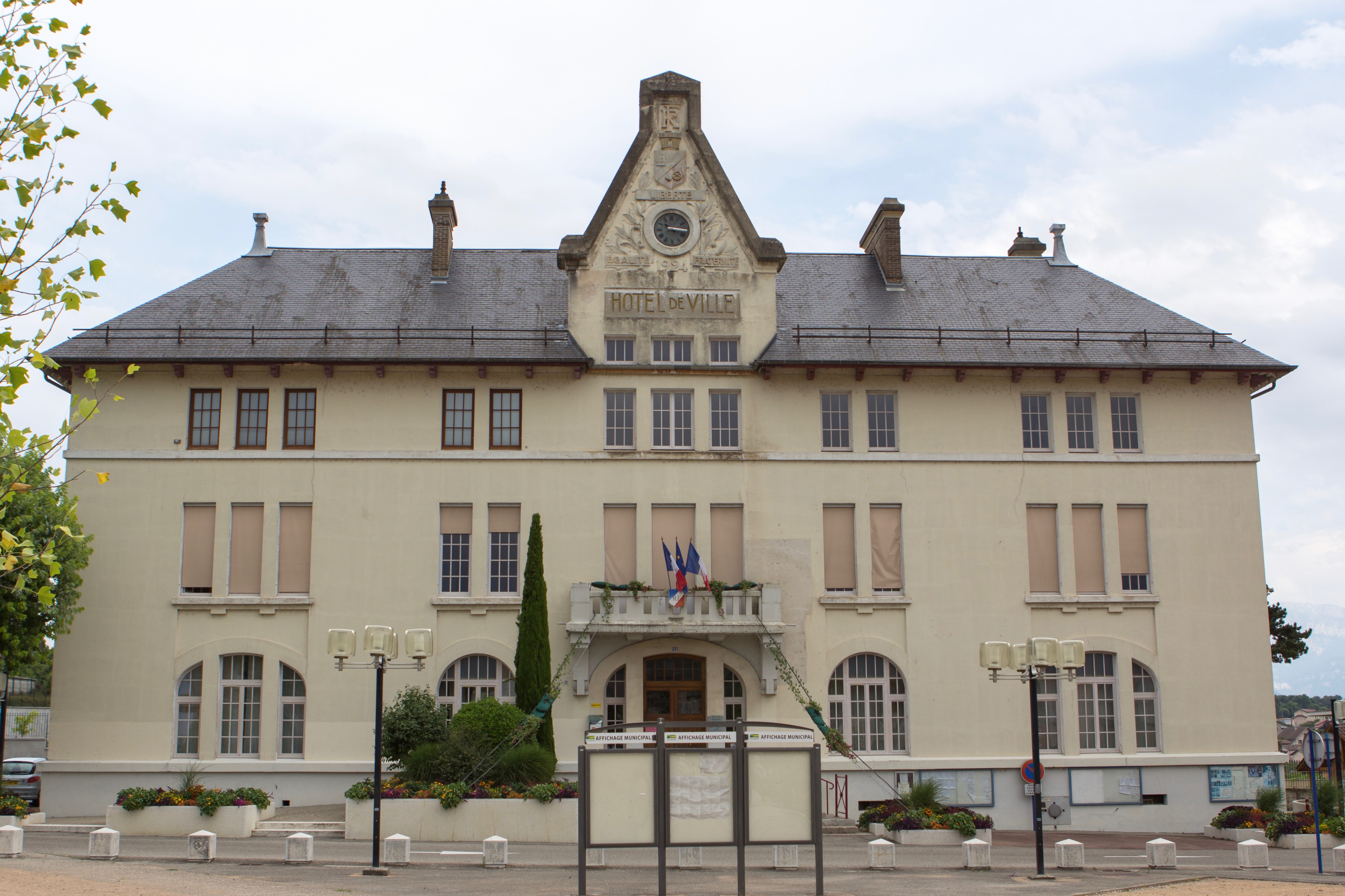
- Town hall

- Coat of arms
- Location of Rives
- Location within France Location within Auvergne-Rhône-Alpes
- Coordinates: 45°21′06″N 5°30′11″E
- Country: France
- Region: Auvergne-Rhône-Alpes
- Department: Isère
- Arrondissement: Grenoble
- Canton: Tullins
- Intercommunality: CA Pays Voironnais

Government
  - Mayor (2020–2026): Julien Stevant
- Area^{1}: 10.93 km^{2} (4.22 sq mi)
- Highest elevation: 469 m (1,539 ft)
- Lowest elevation: 314 m (1,030 ft)
- Population (2019): 6,670
  - Density: 610/km^{2} (1,580/sq mi)
- Time zone: UTC+01:00 (CET)
  - Summer (DST): UTC+02:00 (CEST)
- INSEE/Postal code: 38337 /38140
- ^{1} French Land Register data, which excludes lakes, ponds, glaciers > 1 km^{2} (0.386 sq mi or 247 acres) and river estuaries.

Rives (French pronunciation: [ʁiv]) is a commune in the Isère department in southeastern France.

== Population ==
Historical population

Year	Pop.	±% p.a.
1793	1,429	—
1800	1,530	+0.98%
1806	1,715	+1.92%
1821	2,050	+1.20%
1831	2,014	−0.18%
1836	2,226	+2.02%
1841	2,270	+0.39%
1846	2,413	+1.23%
1851	2,339	−0.62%
1856	2,334	−0.04%
1861	2,506	+1.43%
1866	2,507	+0.01%
1872	2,543	+0.24%
1876	2,541	−0.02%
1881	2,975	+3.20%
1886	2,983	+0.05%
1891	3,083	+0.66%
1896	3,032	−0.33%
1901	3,110	+0.51%

Year	Pop.	±% p.a.
1906	3,178	+0.43%
1911	3,156	−0.14%
1921	3,033	−0.40%
1926	3,280	+1.58%
1931	3,139	−0.87%
1936	2,837	−2.00%
1946	2,842	+0.02%
1954	3,139	+1.25%
1962	3,902	+2.76%
1968	4,589	+2.74%
1975	5,007	+1.25%
1982	5,115	+0.31%
1990	5,403	+0.69%
1999	5,620	+0.44%
2007	5,794	+0.38%
2012	6,045	+0.85%
2017	6,476	+1.39%
2023	6,549	+0.19%

Source: EHESS and INSEE (1968-2023)

== Access ==
By road: By motorway (A48) or the Départemental Road, the D1085, between Lyon and Grenoble

By train: The TER Lyon Perrache/Saint André le Gaz/Grenoble line. Rives station is a terminus for some TER suburban trains of the Grenoble Metro

By plane: Saint Étienne de Saint Geoirs' airport (code GNB) is 15 kilometres away from Rives (20 minutes by car.)

== Transport ==
=== Pays Voironnais network ===
- The bus line n°10 goes from the railstation to the down-town (route de la Liampre)
- The bus line J stops at Rives
- Some buses of the line M stops at Rives

=== Transisère network ===
- The bus line 7300 (Beaurepaire-Grenoble) stops at the station "Rives le plan".
- Some buses of the line 2900 (Vienne-Grenoble) stops at the station "Rives le plan".

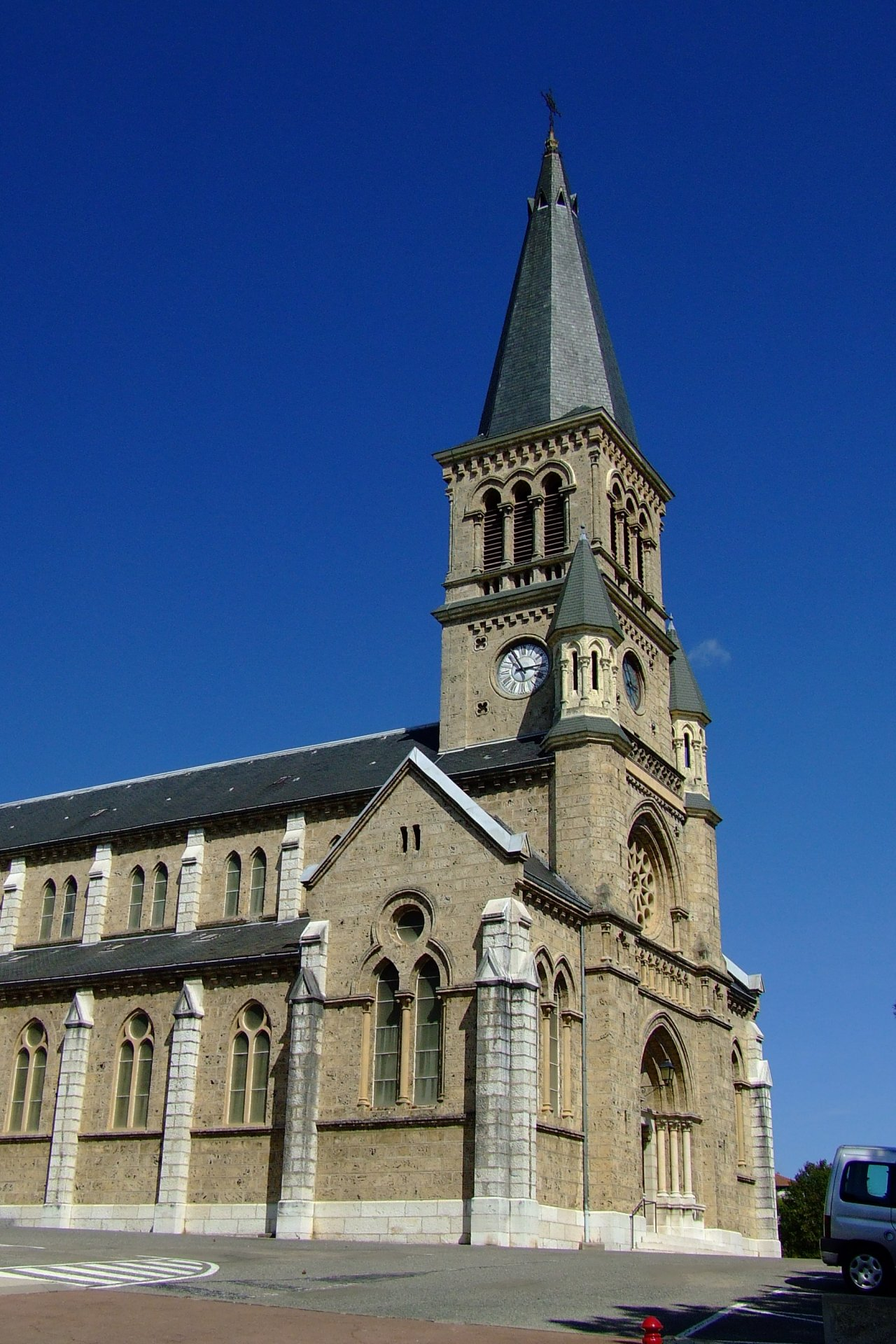
The church of Rives

== Personalities ==
- Napoleon Bonaparte spent a night in Rives, on his return from Elba, in a building that is now a bank. A plaque commemorates the visit.
- Luc Court, motor-car builder was born here in 1862.
- Jérémy Clément, footballer of Paris Saint-Germain was originally from Rives.
- Raphaël Poirée, biathlete was born here.

== International relations ==
- Forlì del Sannio, Italy
- Refojos de Basto, Portugal

== See also ==
- Communes of the Isère department
