= Sampigny =

- Commune
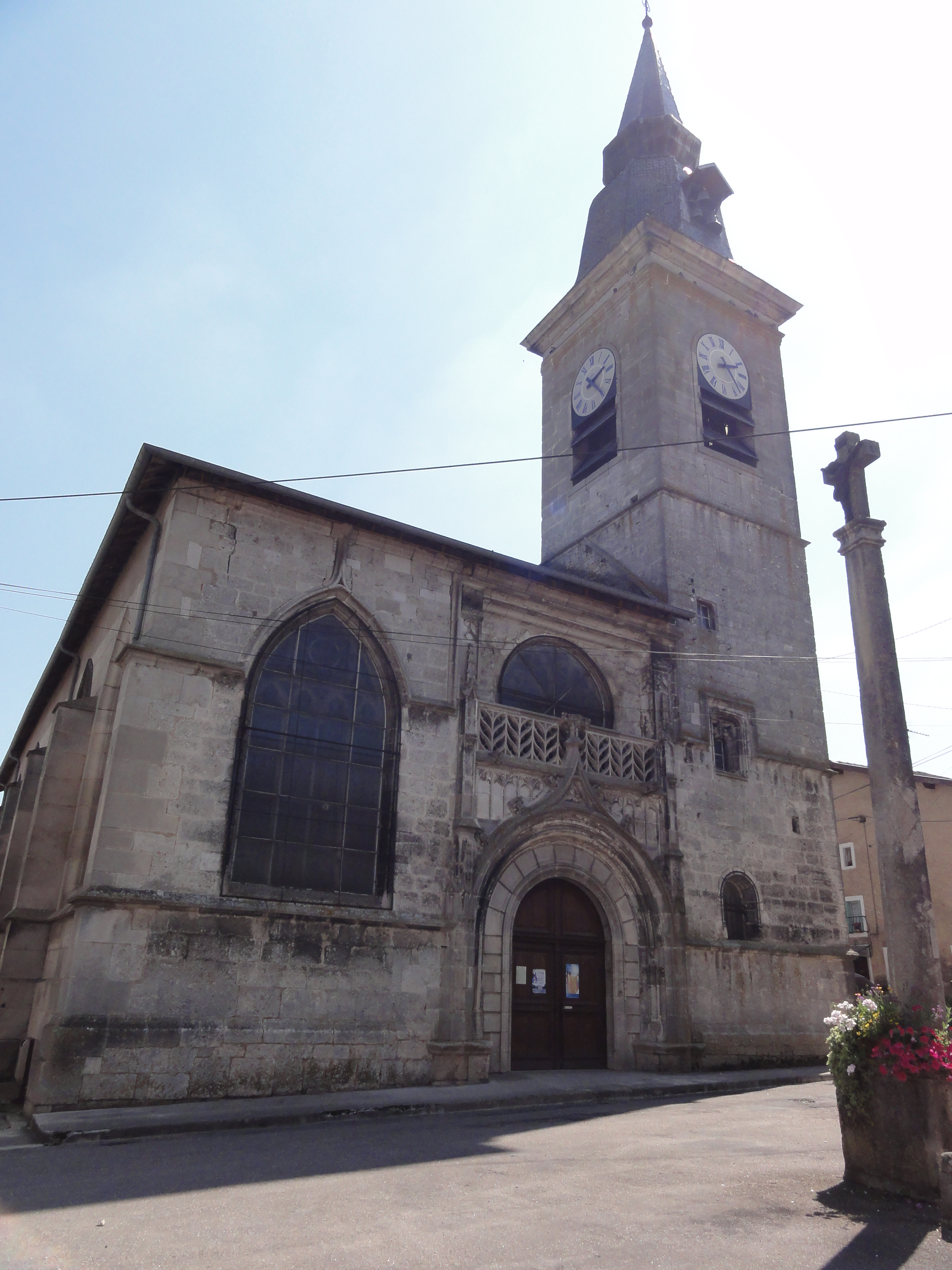
- The church in Sampigny

- Coat of arms
- Location of Sampigny
- Location within France Location within Grand Est
- Coordinates: 48°49′32″N 5°30′42″E
- Country: France
- Region: Grand Est
- Department: Meuse
- Arrondissement: Commercy
- Canton: Dieue-sur-Meuse
- Intercommunality: Sammiellois

Government
  - Mayor (2020–2026): François Vuillaume
- Area^{1}: 20.53 km^{2} (7.93 sq mi)
- Elevation: 227 m (745 ft)
- Highest elevation: 350 m (1,150 ft)
- Lowest elevation: 221 m (725 ft)
- Population (2023): 692
  - Density: 33.7/km^{2} (87.3/sq mi)
- Time zone: UTC+01:00 (CET)
  - Summer (DST): UTC+02:00 (CEST)
- INSEE/Postal code: 55467 /55300
- ^{1} French Land Register data, which excludes lakes, ponds, glaciers > 1 km^{2} (0.386 sq mi or 247 acres) and river estuaries.

Sampigny (French pronunciation: [sɑ̃piɲi]) is a commune in the Meuse department in Grand Est in north-eastern France.

== See also ==
- Communes of the Meuse department
- Antoine Pâris
