= Moirans =

- Commune
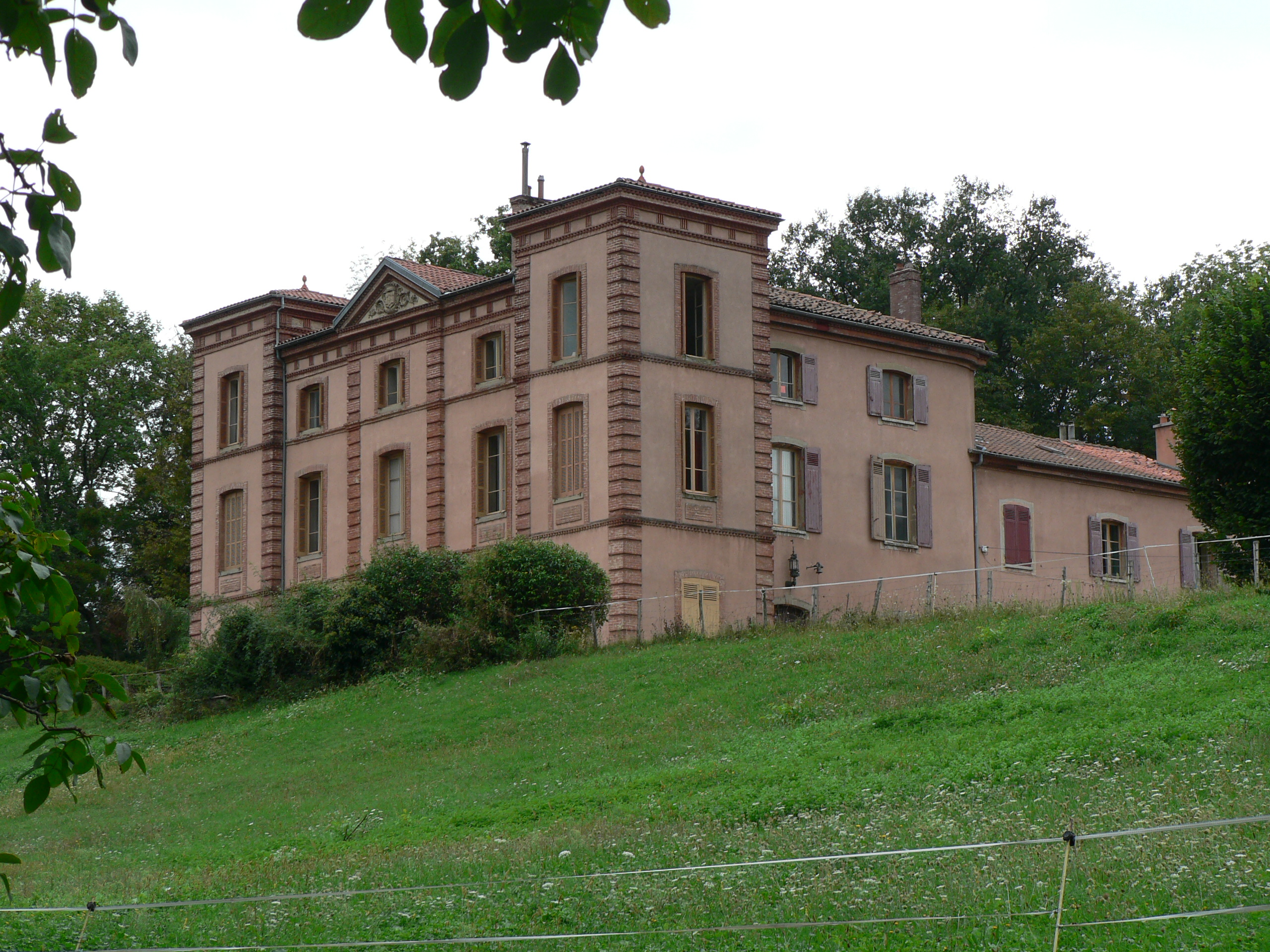
- Chateau of La Motte

- Coat of arms
- Location of Moirans
- Location within France Location within Auvergne-Rhône-Alpes
- Coordinates: 45°19′33″N 5°33′55″E
- Country: France
- Region: Auvergne-Rhône-Alpes
- Department: Isère
- Arrondissement: Grenoble
- Canton: Tullins
- Intercommunality: CA Pays Voironnais

Government
  - Mayor (2020–2026): Valérie Zulian
- Area^{1}: 20.06 km^{2} (7.75 sq mi)
- Highest elevation: 341 m (1,119 ft)
- Lowest elevation: 180 m (590 ft)
- Population (2023): 7,818
  - Density: 389.7/km^{2} (1,009/sq mi)
- Time zone: UTC+01:00 (CET)
  - Summer (DST): UTC+02:00 (CEST)
- INSEE/Postal code: 38239 /38430
- ^{1} French Land Register data, which excludes lakes, ponds, glaciers > 1 km^{2} (0.386 sq mi or 247 acres) and river estuaries.

Moirans (French pronunciation: [mwaʁ'ɑ̃]) is a commune in the Isère department in southeastern France.

== Population ==
Historical population

| Year | Pop. | ±% p.a. |
|---|---|---|
| 1793 | 2,006 | — |
| 1800 | 2,607 | +3.81% |
| 1806 | 2,482 | −0.82% |
| 1821 | 2,742 | +0.67% |
| 1831 | 2,765 | +0.08% |
| 1836 | 2,703 | −0.45% |
| 1841 | 2,769 | +0.48% |
| 1846 | 2,834 | +0.47% |
| 1851 | 2,765 | −0.49% |
| 1856 | 2,803 | +0.27% |
| 1861 | 2,789 | −0.10% |
| 1866 | 2,842 | +0.38% |
| 1872 | 2,844 | +0.01% |
| 1876 | 2,903 | +0.51% |
| 1881 | 3,227 | +2.14% |
| 1886 | 3,156 | −0.44% |
| 1891 | 3,186 | +0.19% |
| 1896 | 3,253 | +0.42% |
| 1901 | 3,479 | +1.35% |

| Year | Pop. | ±% p.a. |
|---|---|---|
| 1906 | 3,587 | +0.61% |
| 1911 | 3,805 | +1.19% |
| 1921 | 3,517 | −0.78% |
| 1926 | 3,816 | +1.65% |
| 1931 | 3,908 | +0.48% |
| 1936 | 3,484 | −2.27% |
| 1946 | 3,418 | −0.19% |
| 1954 | 3,840 | +1.47% |
| 1962 | 3,959 | +0.38% |
| 1968 | 4,536 | +2.29% |
| 1975 | 5,106 | +1.71% |
| 1982 | 6,313 | +3.08% |
| 1990 | 7,133 | +1.54% |
| 1999 | 7,495 | +0.55% |
| 2007 | 7,804 | +0.51% |
| 2012 | 7,845 | +0.10% |
| 2017 | 7,852 | +0.02% |
| 2023 | 7,818 | −0.07% |

Source: EHESS and INSEE (1968-2023)

== See also ==
- Communes of the Isère department
- Claude Pâris la Montagne
