= Lac de Paladru =

Lake in France

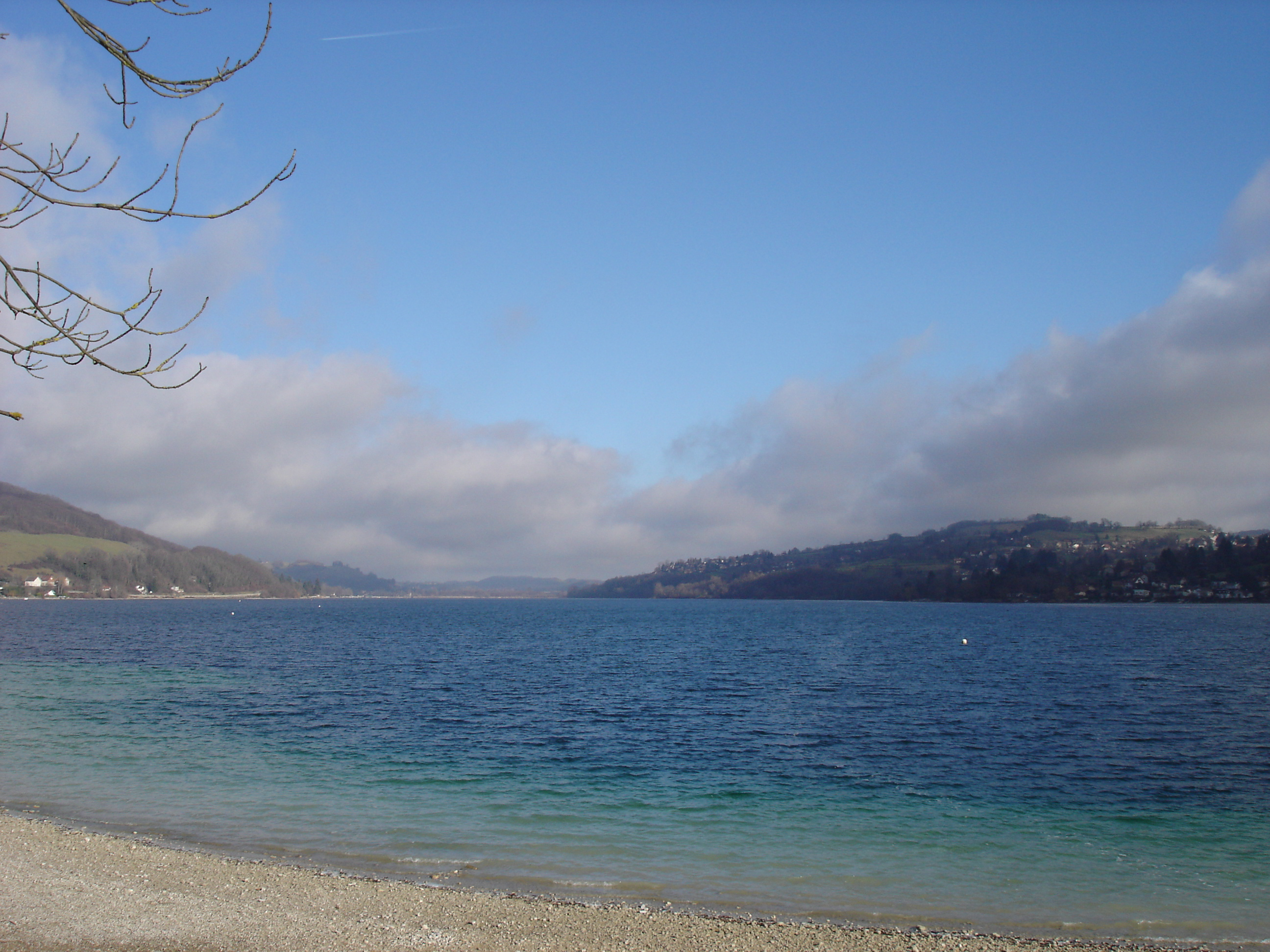

- Location within Auvergne-Rhône-Alpes
- Location: Isère
- Coordinates: 45°27′N 5°32′E
- Primary inflows: Courbon, Pin
- Primary outflows: la Fure
- Basin countries: France
- Max. length: 5,300 m (17,400 ft)
- Max. width: 950 m (3,120 ft)
- Surface area: 3.9 km^{2} (1.5 sq mi)
- Average depth: 25 m (82 ft)
- Max. depth: 33 m (108 ft)
- Water volume: 97 million cubic metres (79,000 acre⋅ft)
- Residence time: 3.6 years
- Settlements: Paladru, Charavines, Le Pin, Bilieu, Montferrat

Lake Paladru (Lac de Paladru, nicknamed "Lac Bleu" by local residents) is a small lake located in the Isère département of Auvergne-Rhône-Alpes, near Charavines, in France.

The lake was formed by the glacier of the Rhône. It is 5.3 kilometres long and 1.2 kilometres wide when full. The maximum depth is 36 metres. The lake is shared among four municipalities and two cantons. It is the fifth largest natural lake of glacier origin in France.

It is a major archaeological site, with several protected natural areas that are inaccessible to the public.

== Geography ==
=== Location ===
Lake Paladru is located in the Isère département, in the region of the Miocene hills of Bas-Dauphiné called "Terres froides" and between the towns of Voiron and La Tour-du-Pin. It extends in a north-east or south-west orientation over 5.3 kilometres for a width of 650 metres. The average depth is 25 metres, with a maximum depth of 36 metres, when full. The lake contains 97 million m³ of water, and is located 492 metres above sea level.

Four municipalities share the lake; Charavines to the south, Villages du Lac de Paladru (merge of Le Pin and Paladru in 2017) to the west and north, and Montferrat and Bilieu to the east.

The main beaches are located at the northern and southern ends, the shores on the side have a steeper gradient.

=== Access ===
The lake is bordered by two departmental roads which allow access:

- The route départementale 50 (D50) which connects the town of La Bâtie-Divisin (at a junction with the D1075) to the town of La Murette (at a junction with the D520)
- The route départementale 90 (D90) which connects the town of Charavines with Villages du Lac de Paladru along the eastern shore.

The lake is located about 5 kilometres from the A48 autoroute, which connects the A43 to Grenoble. The lake can be accessed from either junction 9 for Rives, or junction 10 for Voiron.

=== Hydrography ===
==== Water source ====
The lake is fed by two streams which are two tributaries of La Fure:

- the Courbon, a 3.7 kilometre long stream which originates at Montferrat and joins the lake at Paladru.
- the Surand, also known as Chantabot or Marais stream. This is an outlet from the Vivier pond, a body of water located in the municipality of Valencogne.

==== The source of La Fure ====
La Fure enters the lake at Charavines. This river joins the Isère at Tullins, after 20 kilometres having crossed Rives.

=== Weather ===
The lake area has a cool temperate climate. The north–south orientation and relatively high altitude means the average temperature is around 10 °C. Rainfall is irregular, with most rain occurring in June and October with the rise of humid air masses from the Mediterranean. January is the coldest month, with freezing occurring frequently.

== Toponymy ==
There are two possibilities to explain the origin of the name:

- the word palud (sometimes written palue) means "marais" (marsh in English) in ancient French. The term Paladru, attached to the village of the same name, is similar to this term. A marsh is located north of the lake.
- According to Dauphinois historian Nicolas Chorier, the term Paladru could refer to the presence of oaks ("δρύς" drús in Greek).

== History ==
Between 1909 and 1913, the lake served as an experimental ground for prototype seaplanes built by Raymond de Montgolfier, from the family of aviation pioneers the Montgolfier brothers.
