= La Bâtie-Divisin =

- Part of Les Abrets en Dauphiné
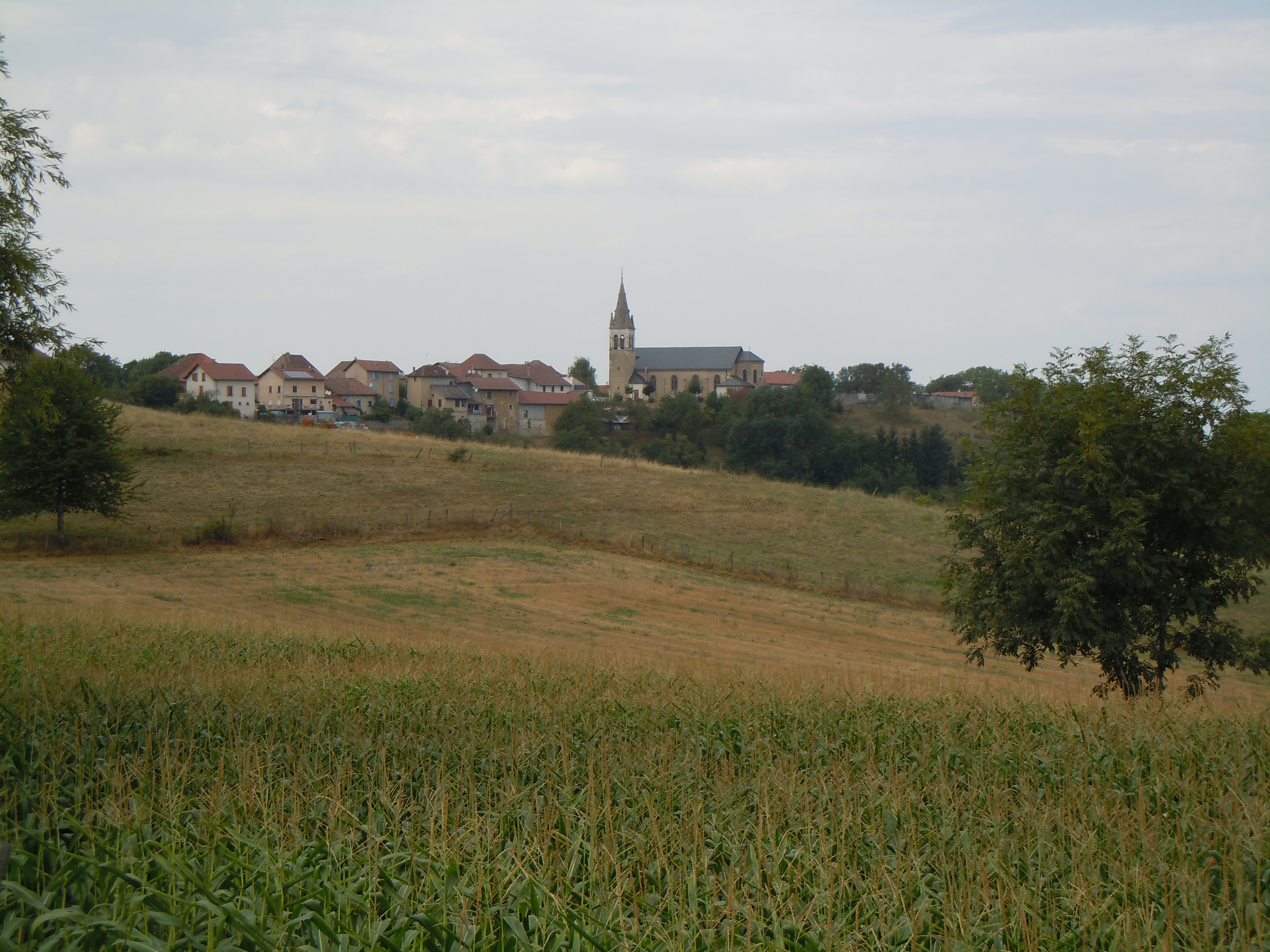
- Location of La Bâtie-Divisin
- Location within France Location within Auvergne-Rhône-Alpes
- Coordinates: 45°30′39″N 5°35′55″E
- Country: France
- Region: Auvergne-Rhône-Alpes
- Department: Isère
- Arrondissement: La Tour-du-Pin
- Canton: Chartreuse-Guiers
- Commune: Les Abrets en Dauphiné
- Area^{1}: 10.51 km^{2} (4.06 sq mi)
- Highest elevation: 615 m (2,018 ft)
- Lowest elevation: 360 m (1,180 ft)
- Population (2022): 1,041
  - Density: 99.05/km^{2} (256.5/sq mi)
- Time zone: UTC+01:00 (CET)
  - Summer (DST): UTC+02:00 (CEST)
- Postal code: 38490
- ^{1} French Land Register data, which excludes lakes, ponds, glaciers > 1 km^{2} (0.386 sq mi or 247 acres) and river estuaries.

La Bâtie-Divisin (French pronunciation: [la bati divizɛ̃]; Arpitan: La Bâtia-Devesins) is a former commune in the Isère department in the Auvergne-Rhône-Alpes region of south-eastern France. It was created in 1790 from a merger of the parishes of Chapelle de Peyrin and Recoin. On 1 January 2016, it was merged into the new commune of Les Abrets en Dauphiné.

The inhabitants of the commune are known as Récugnots or Récugnotes.

== Geography ==
La Bâtie-Divisin is located some 23 km east by south-east of Bourgoin-Jallieu and 15 km north of Voiron. Access to the commune is by the D1075 from Les Abrets in the north which passes through the village and continues south to Montferrat. The D28 goes south-east from the village to Saint-Geoire-en-Valdaine. The D50C links the south of the commune to Montferrat. The D50 branches from the D1075 at the southern border and goes south-west to Paladru. Apart from the village there are the hamlets of La Chapelle in the north and La Charrière in the south. The commune is mostly farmland with a little forest.

The Ruisseau de Corbassière rises in the south of the commune and flows north through the centre of the commune from south to north to join the Bièvre north-east of the commune. The Ruisseau des Rajans forms the south-eastern border of the commune as it flows north-east to join the Ruisseau de Gorgeat, which rises in the commune, and it becomes the Ruisseau de la Corbière.

== Toponymy ==
La Bâtie-Divisin appears as Recoing on the 1750 Cassini Map and the same on the 1790 version.

== Administration ==
List of Successive Mayors

| From | To | Name |
|---|---|---|
| 2001 | 2016 | Yvonne Rateau |

== Demography ==
Historical population

| Year | Pop. | ±% p.a. |
|---|---|---|
| 1793 | 773 | — |
| 1800 | 970 | +3.30% |
| 1806 | 1,101 | +2.13% |
| 1821 | 1,203 | +0.59% |
| 1831 | 1,234 | +0.25% |
| 1836 | 1,290 | +0.89% |
| 1841 | 1,364 | +1.12% |
| 1846 | 1,426 | +0.89% |
| 1851 | 1,415 | −0.15% |
| 1856 | 1,318 | −1.41% |
| 1861 | 1,303 | −0.23% |
| 1866 | 1,321 | +0.27% |
| 1872 | 1,281 | −0.51% |
| 1876 | 1,260 | −0.41% |
| 1881 | 1,165 | −1.56% |
| 1886 | 1,131 | −0.59% |
| 1891 | 1,101 | −0.54% |
| 1896 | 1,067 | −0.63% |

| Year | Pop. | ±% p.a. |
|---|---|---|
| 1901 | 986 | −1.57% |
| 1906 | 961 | −0.51% |
| 1911 | 907 | −1.15% |
| 1921 | 770 | −1.62% |
| 1926 | 739 | −0.82% |
| 1931 | 700 | −1.08% |
| 1936 | 668 | −0.93% |
| 1946 | 655 | −0.20% |
| 1954 | 611 | −0.87% |
| 1962 | 563 | −1.02% |
| 1968 | 546 | −0.51% |
| 1975 | 560 | +0.36% |
| 1982 | 589 | +0.72% |
| 1990 | 685 | +1.91% |
| 1999 | 802 | +1.77% |
| 2007 | 852 | +0.76% |
| 2012 | 892 | +0.92% |
| 2022 | 1,041 | +1.56% |

Source: EHESS and INSEE

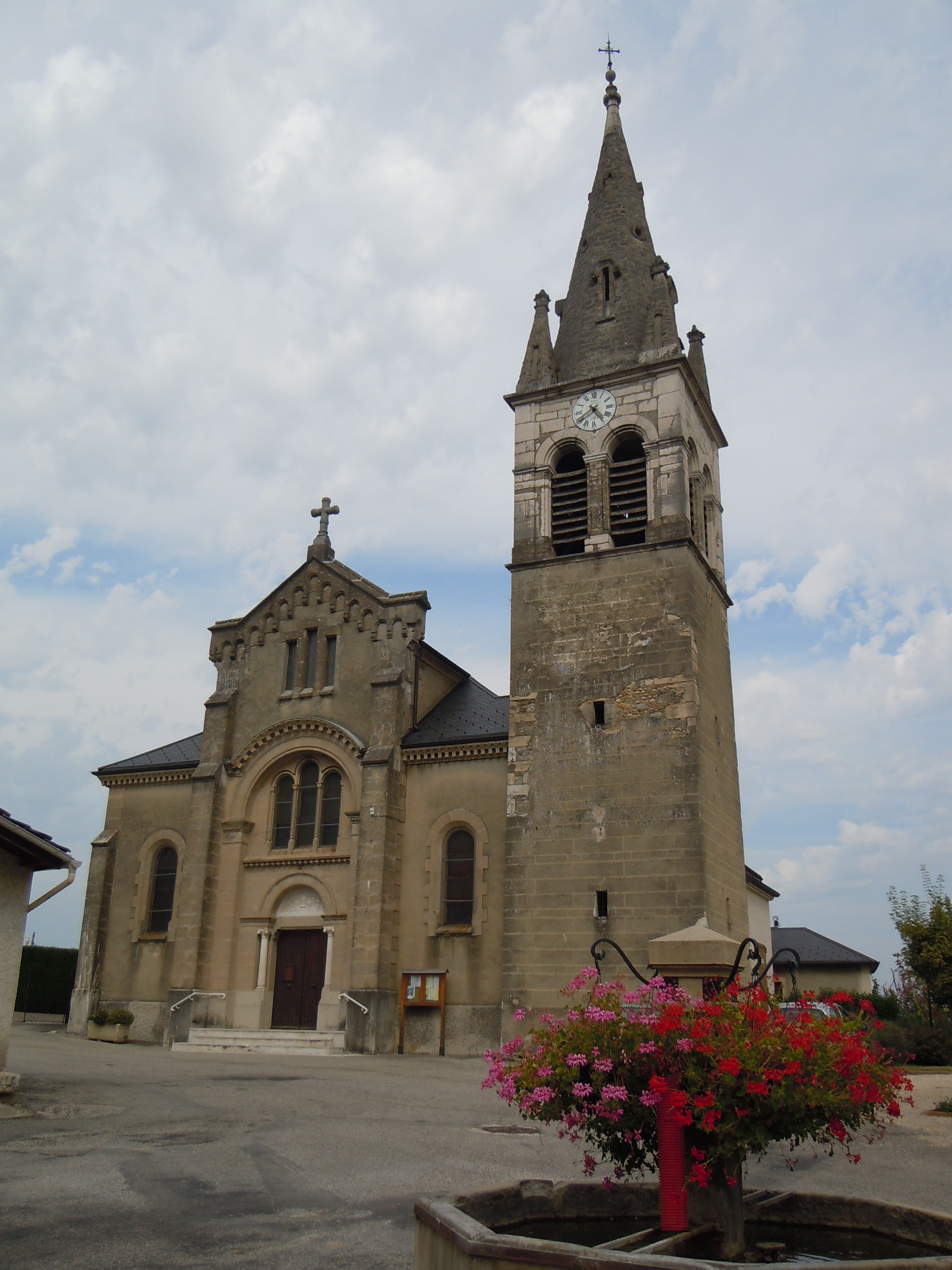
The Parish Church

== Culture and Heritage ==
=== Religious heritage ===
- The Parish Church

=== Environmental heritage ===
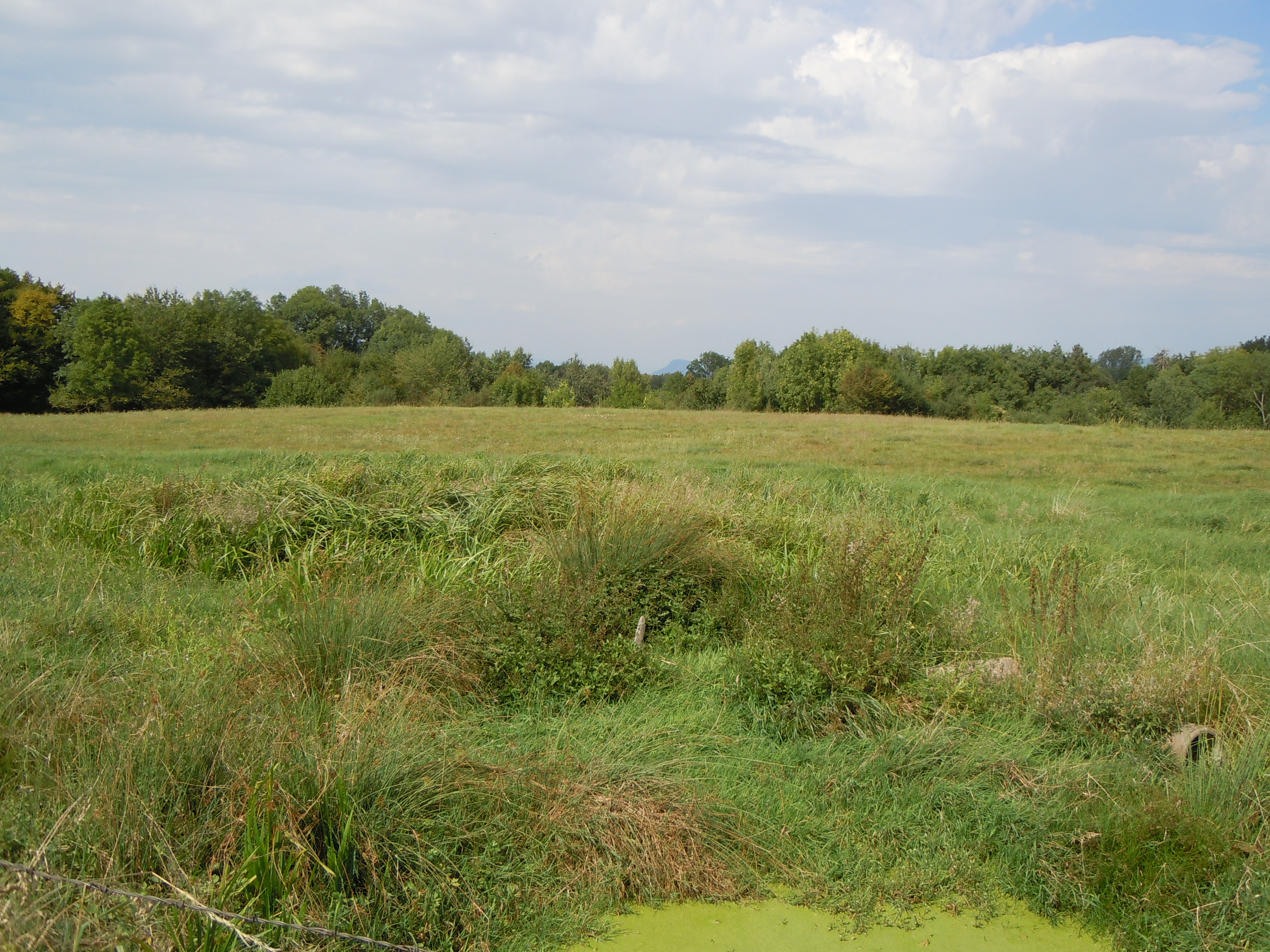
The Ruisseau de la Corbassière Valley

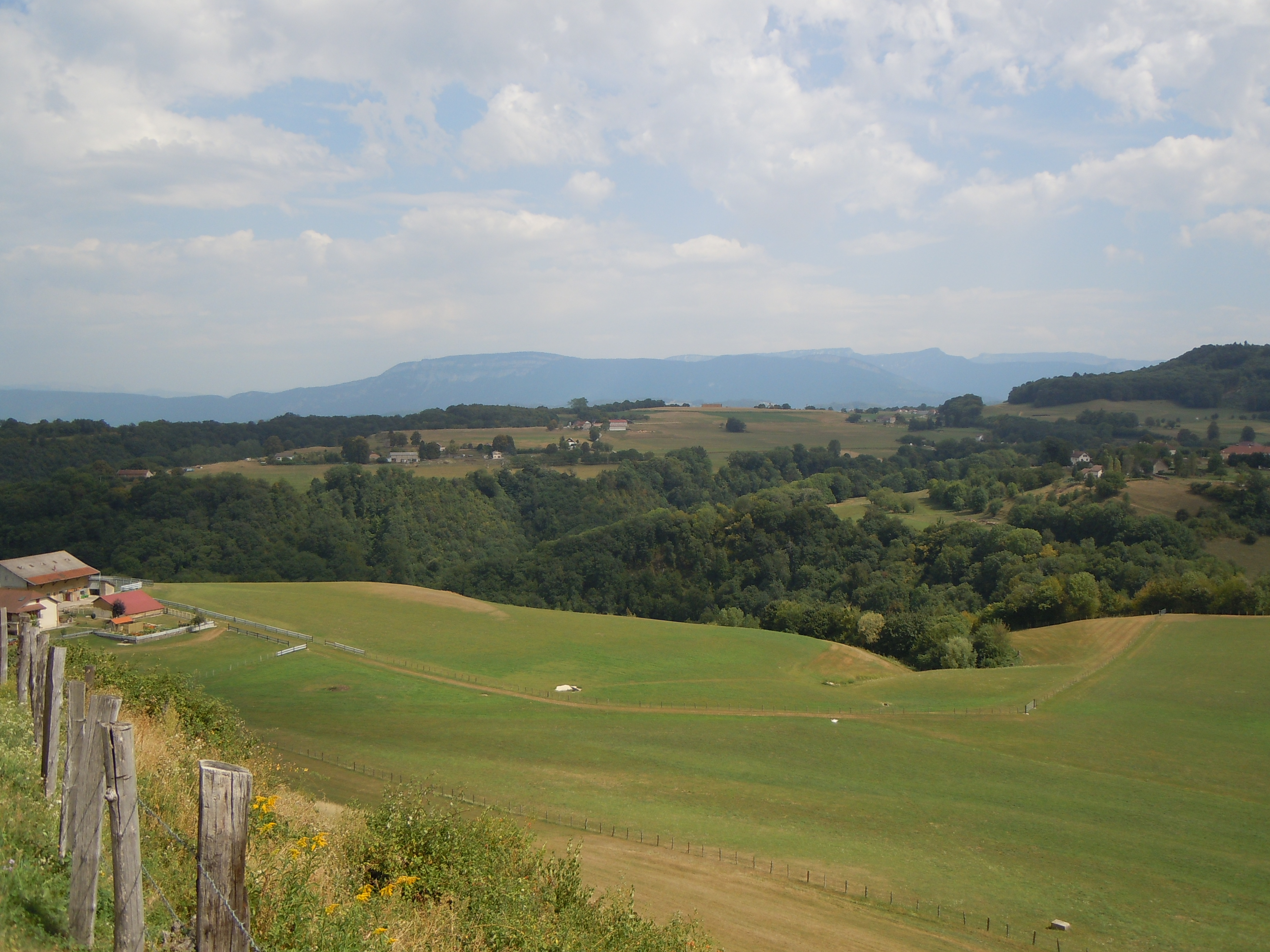
The Rajan and Combe Pigna from Mount Rond

The commune has two Zones of natural ecological interest, flora and faune:

- The Humid woodlands of the Ruisseau de la Corbassière
- The Forests bordering the Rajans, Caron, and la Combe Pigna streams

== See also ==
- Communes of the Isère department
