= Adolphe Pégoud =

French flying ace (1889–1915)

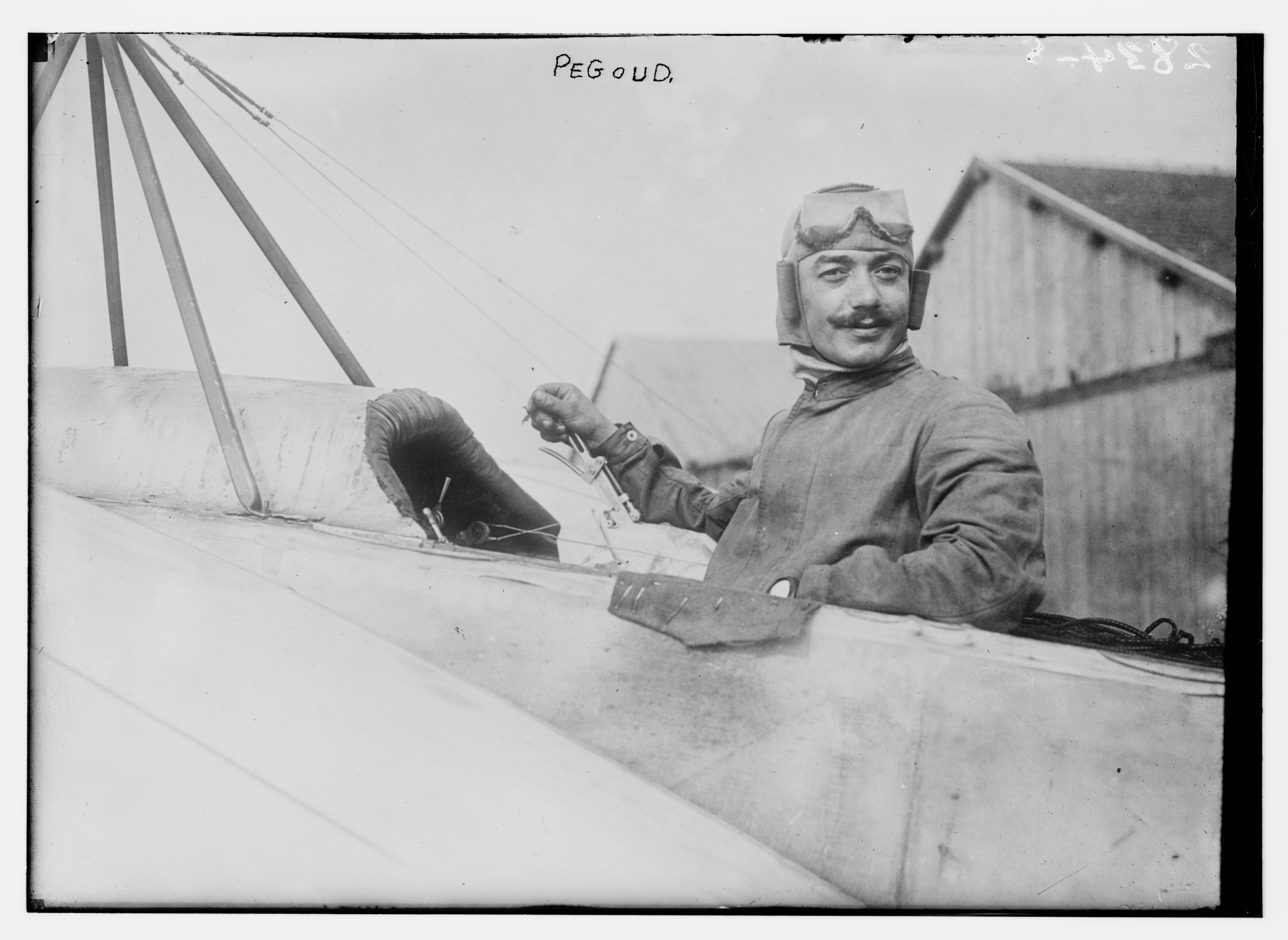
- Adolphe Pégoud
- Nickname: Roi du ciel (King of the sky)
- Born: Adolphe Célestin Pégoud; 13 June 1889; Montferrat, France
- Died: 31 August 1915 (aged 26) Petit-Croix, France
- Allegiance: France
- Branch: French Army
- Service years: 1907–1915
- Rank: Second lieutenant
- Conflicts: World War I
- Awards: Knight of the Legion of Honour; Médaille militaire Croix de guerre 1914–1918
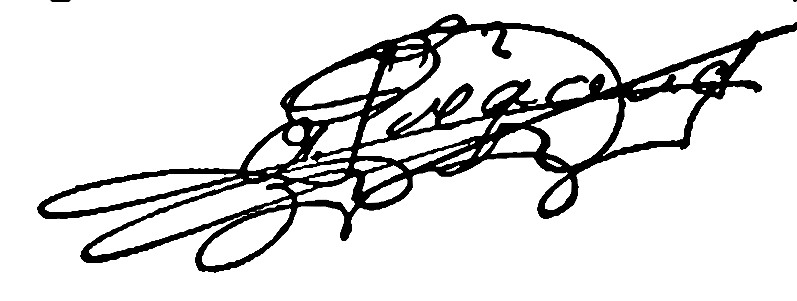
- Signature

Adolphe Célestin Pégoud (French pronunciation: [adɔlf peɡu]; 13 June 1889 – 31 August 1915) was a French aviator and flight instructor who became the first fighter ace in history during World War I.

== Biography ==
Adolphe Célestin Pégoud was born 13 June 1889 in Montferrat, France. Pégoud served in the French Army from 1907 to 1913. Discharged on 13 February 1913, he immediately began flying, and earned his pilot's certificate 1 March 1913. Using a sacrifice aircraft, Pégoud was the first pilot to make a parachute jump from an airplane. During the first jump, observing the unexpected path of the plane and particularly a loop-like trajectory, he was convinced he could reproduce and control the same in flight. After landing, Pégoud addressed reporters: "I've seen him, alone, looping the loop. So you see that this is possible. Also, I will try!"

As a test pilot for Louis Blériot, he devoted himself to this goal with a Blériot model XI monoplane in a series of test flights exploring the limits of airplane maneuvers. Having modified his airplane, and after realistic "head down" ground training, he then flew the first inverted flight on 1 September 1913.

Then, on 21 September he flew a loop, believing it to be the world's first. Pégoud's feat was consequently widely publicized and believed by many to be the first loop, although Pyotr Nesterov, a Russian army pilot, had already flown the first loop on 9 September 1913, 12 days earlier in a Nieuport IV monoplane at an army airfield near Kiev. Soon after his feat, Pégoud was invited by the Czar of Russia to perform in Moscow a series of demonstrations followed by student training.

Pégoud became a popular instructor of French and other European fledgling pilots.

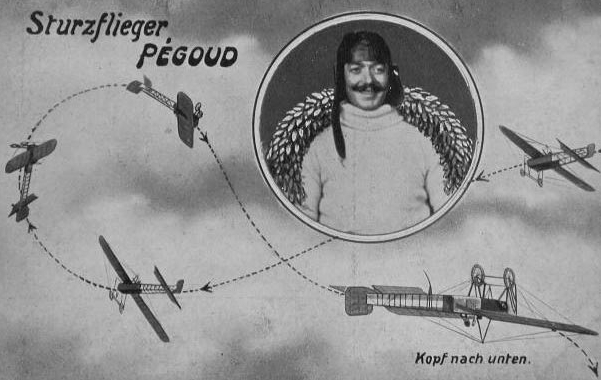
German pre-war postcard depicting Pégoud's loop

At the start of World War I, Pégoud volunteered for flying duty and was immediately accepted as an observation pilot. On 5 February 1915, he and his gunner were credited with shooting down two German aircraft and forcing another to land. Soon he was flying single-seat aircraft and in April claimed two further victories. His sixth success came in July.

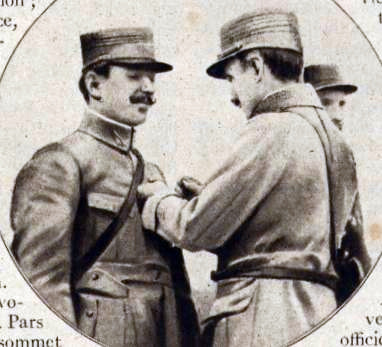
Pégoud being awarded the Croix de Guerre

It is not known how many of Pégoud's victories involved destruction of enemy aircraft, as early air combat was rare enough to warrant credit for a forced landing. However, it is certain that Pégoud, rather than Roland Garros (four documented victories, and later), was the first pilot to achieve ace status of any sort. (Note: This title appeared for the first time when newspapers described Pégoud as a "flying ace" after his five victories)

On 31 August 1915, Pégoud was shot down and killed by Unteroffizier Otto Kandulski, who had been his pupil, while intercepting a German reconnaissance aircraft. He was 26 years old. The same German crew later dropped a funeral wreath behind the French lines. Two weeks later, Kandulski was shot down by the French pilot Roger Ronserail, earning Ronserail the title "Le Vengeur de Pégoud" ("The avenger of Pégoud").

First buried in Petit-Croix, his remains were later moved in 1920 to Montparnasse Cemetery in Paris.

== Sources ==
- Norman Franks & Frank Bailey - Over the Front: A Complete Record of the Fighter Aces and Units of the United States and French Air Services, 1914-1918. (1992).
- Annette Carson - Flight Fantastic: The Illustrated History of Aerobatics.(1986)

Preceded by none	Top Flying Ace; France, WWI	Succeeded by Eugene Gilbert
