= Les Abrets =

Commune in Isère, France

- Delegated commune of Les Abrets-en-Dauphiné
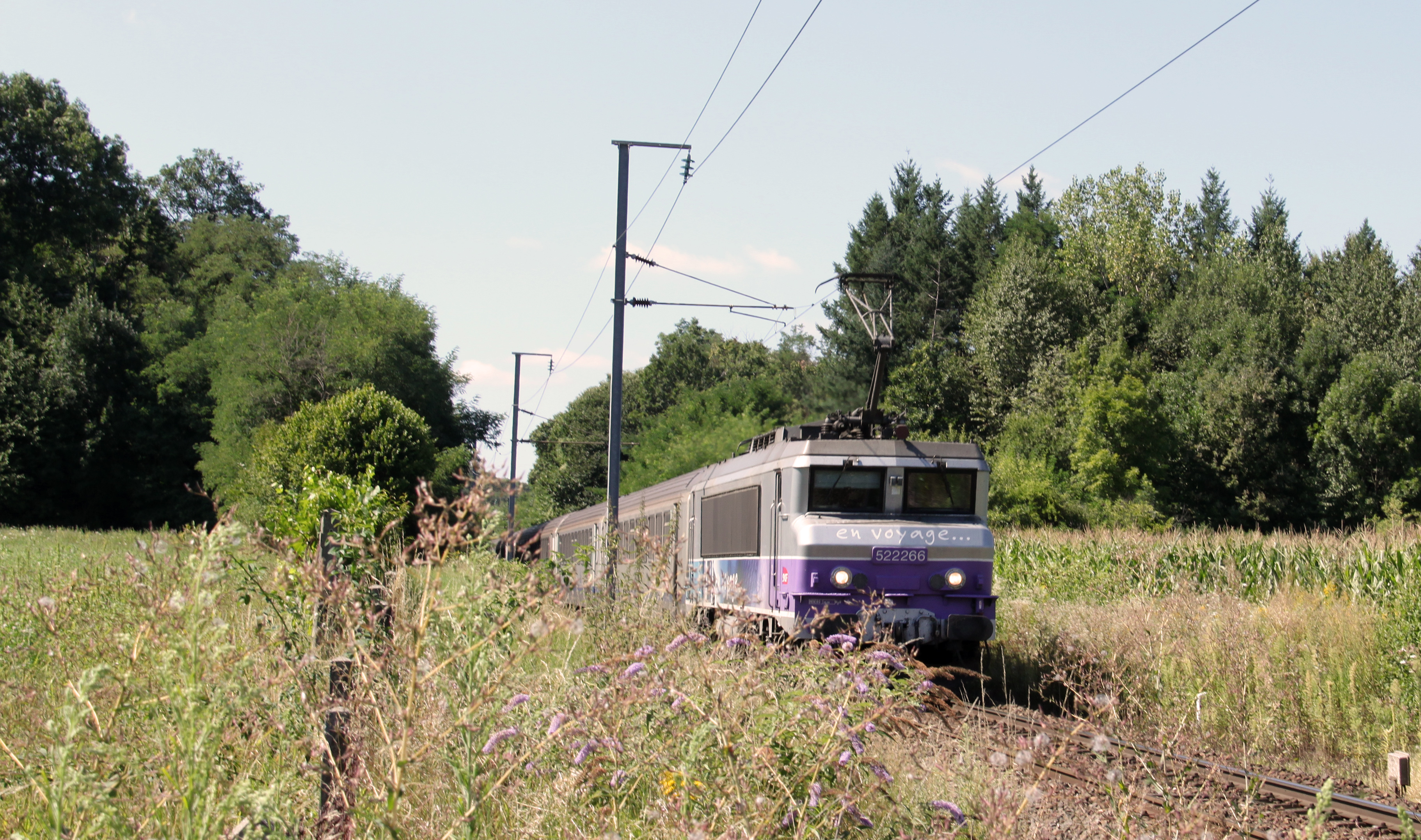
- SNCF train in Les Abrets

- Coat of arms
- Location of Les Abrets
- Location within France Location within Auvergne-Rhône-Alpes
- Coordinates: 45°32′15″N 5°35′09″E
- Country: France
- Region: Auvergne-Rhône-Alpes
- Department: Isère
- Arrondissement: La Tour-du-Pin
- Canton: Chartreuse-Guiers
- Commune: Les Abrets-en-Dauphiné
- Area^{1}: 6.89 km^{2} (2.66 sq mi)
- Highest elevation: 434 m (1,424 ft)
- Lowest elevation: 261 m (856 ft)
- Population (2022): 3,601
  - Density: 523/km^{2} (1,350/sq mi)
- Time zone: UTC+01:00 (CET)
  - Summer (DST): UTC+02:00 (CEST)
- Postal code: 38490
- ^{1} French Land Register data, which excludes lakes, ponds, glaciers > 1 km^{2} (0.386 sq mi or 247 acres) and river estuaries.

Les Abrets (French pronunciation: [lez‿abʁɛ]; Arpitan: Los Âbrèts) is a former commune in the Isère department in the Auvergne-Rhône-Alpes region of southeastern France. On 1 January 2016, it was merged into the new commune of Les Abrets-en-Dauphiné, of which it became a delegated commune.

== Geography ==
Les Abrets is located some 30 km west of Chambery and 25 km east of Bourgoin-Jallieu. The commune can be accessed on the D1075 road from the north-west continuing through the commune and the village to La Bâtie-Divisin in the south. The D1006 highway comes from La Tour-du-Pin in the west and intersects the D1075 in the centre of the village then continues to Le Pont-de-Beauvoisin in the east. There is also the D142E road from the village going north-east, the D592 which goes north from the village continuing to Chimilin, and the D142 going north-west to Fitilieu. A railway passes through the commune from west to east with a station just outside the western edge of the commune. The urban area of Les Abrets covers a large portion of the commune with a belt of forest running north to south through the centre of the commune. With some forested areas in the east of the commune and some forest in the east, the balance of the land area is farmland.

The Bievre stream flows south down the eastern edge of the commune. Other streams flow near the village and to the south.

=== Neighbouring communes and villages ===
Source:

== Toponymy ==
The term Abrets comes from Albrez Albretum or Arbreta (from the Latin Arbor: relative to a tree). This wooded area was given to the "Poor Knights of Christ" in about 1124 who then became the Knights of the Temple of Jerusalem in 1128, known under the name of the Templars.

=== Heraldry ===
Arms of Les Abrets	Blazon: Gules, a chevron debased in Or, in chief to dexter two weaver's shuttles of argent saltirewise, to sinister a dolphin the same, in base three firs vert the middle higher.

== Administration ==
List of Successive Mayors of Les Abrets

Mayors from the French Revolution to 1935

From	To	Name
1792	1804	Paul Morand
1804	1816	Louis Boissier
1816	1830	Jacques Novel
1830	1834	Louis Boissier
1834	1837	Clément Morand
1837	1864	Jacques Novel
1864	1870	Joseph Comte
1870	1871	Félix Jamet
1871	1876	Pierre Landier
1876	1884	Joseph Badin
1884	1889	Benoît Orcel
1889	1893	Elisée Deschaux
1893	1895	Clément Humbert
1895	1901	Firmin Rabatel
1901	1904	Hippolyte Falquet
1904	1918	Philippe Barrier
1918	1919	Antoine Fougier
1919	1935	Eloi Cuchet

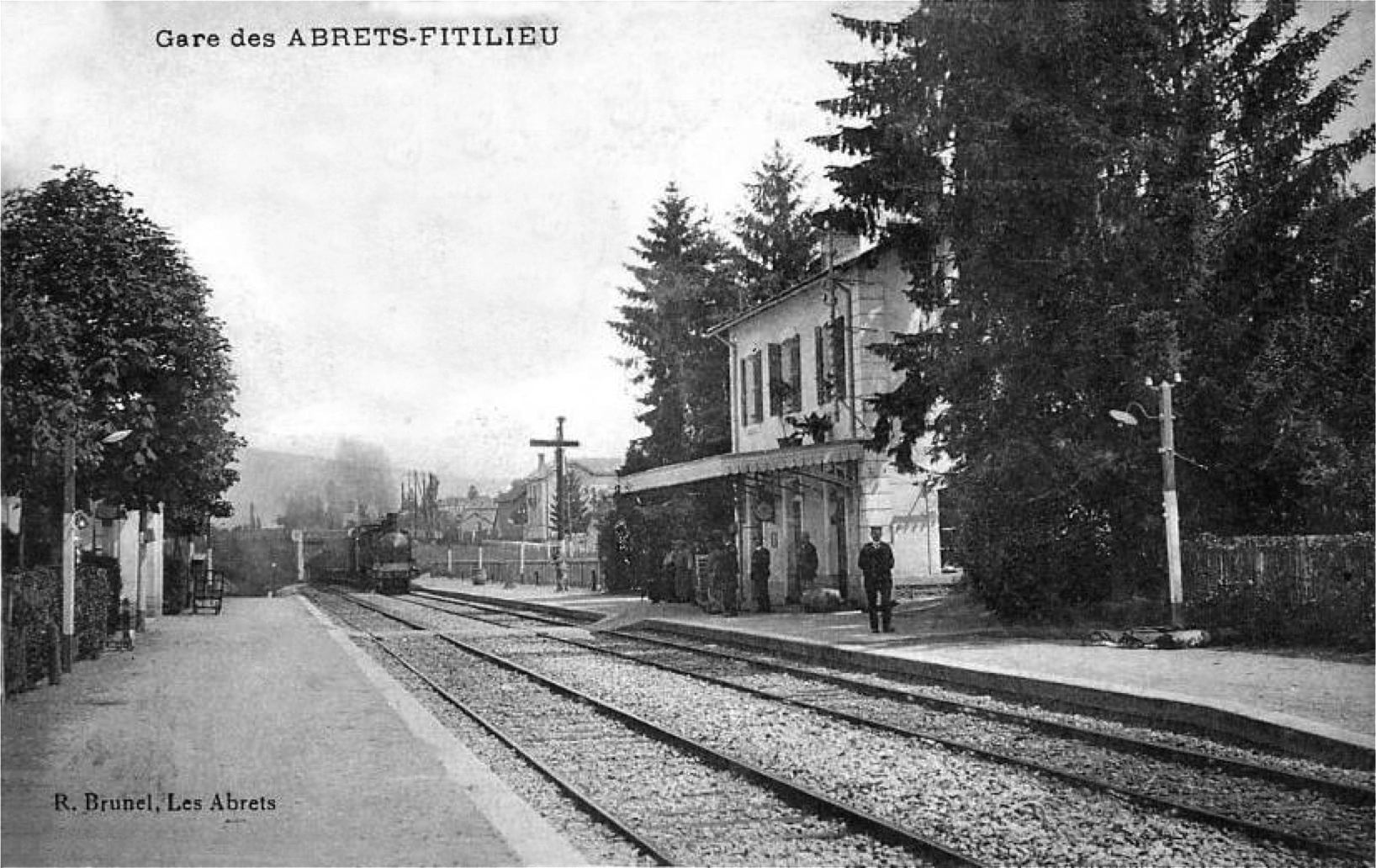
Les Abrets Station in the 1900s

Mayors from 1935

From	To	Name	Party
1935	1959	Pierre Collomb	
1959	1965	Maurice Bernard	
1965	1986	Jean Janin	
1986	1992	Maurice Gaillard	
1992	2008	Jean-Paul Gau	
2008	2014	Jean-Pierre Chabert	UMP
2014	2016	François Boucly	

== Population ==
The inhabitants of the commune are known as Abrésiens or Abrésiennes in French.

Historical population

Year	Pop.	±% p.a.
1793	763	—
1800	688	−1.47%
1806	834	+3.26%
1821	1,071	+1.68%
1831	1,203	+1.17%
1836	1,292	+1.44%
1841	1,347	+0.84%
1846	1,250	−1.48%
1851	1,297	+0.74%
1856	1,305	+0.12%
1861	1,343	+0.58%
1866	1,341	−0.03%
1872	1,440	+1.19%
1876	1,743	+4.89%
1881	1,826	+0.93%
1886	1,705	−1.36%
1891	1,754	+0.57%
1896	1,756	+0.02%

Year	Pop.	±% p.a.
1901	1,818	+0.70%
1906	1,923	+1.13%
1911	1,850	−0.77%
1921	1,773	−0.42%
1926	1,831	+0.65%
1931	1,954	+1.31%
1936	1,818	−1.43%
1946	1,890	+0.39%
1954	2,010	+0.77%
1962	2,215	+1.22%
1968	2,305	+0.67%
1975	2,437	+0.80%
1982	2,795	+1.98%
1990	2,804	+0.04%
1999	2,705	−0.40%
2007	3,050	+1.51%
2012	3,607	+3.41%
2022	3,601	−0.02%

Source: EHESS and INSEE

== Sites and Monuments ==
- A Church (19th century) contains a Chalice with Paten (17th century) which is registered as an historical object.
- The Domaine des Fauves (Abrets Zoological Park)
- Path of Pilgrimage to Saint-Jacques de Compostela: Les Abrets is located on one of the pilgrims trails
- The Bourgeat Factory makes catering equipment and stainless steel for professional kitchens
- The Centre Jean Jannin is an establishment for people with disabilities founded in 1977

The Zoo Picture Gallery

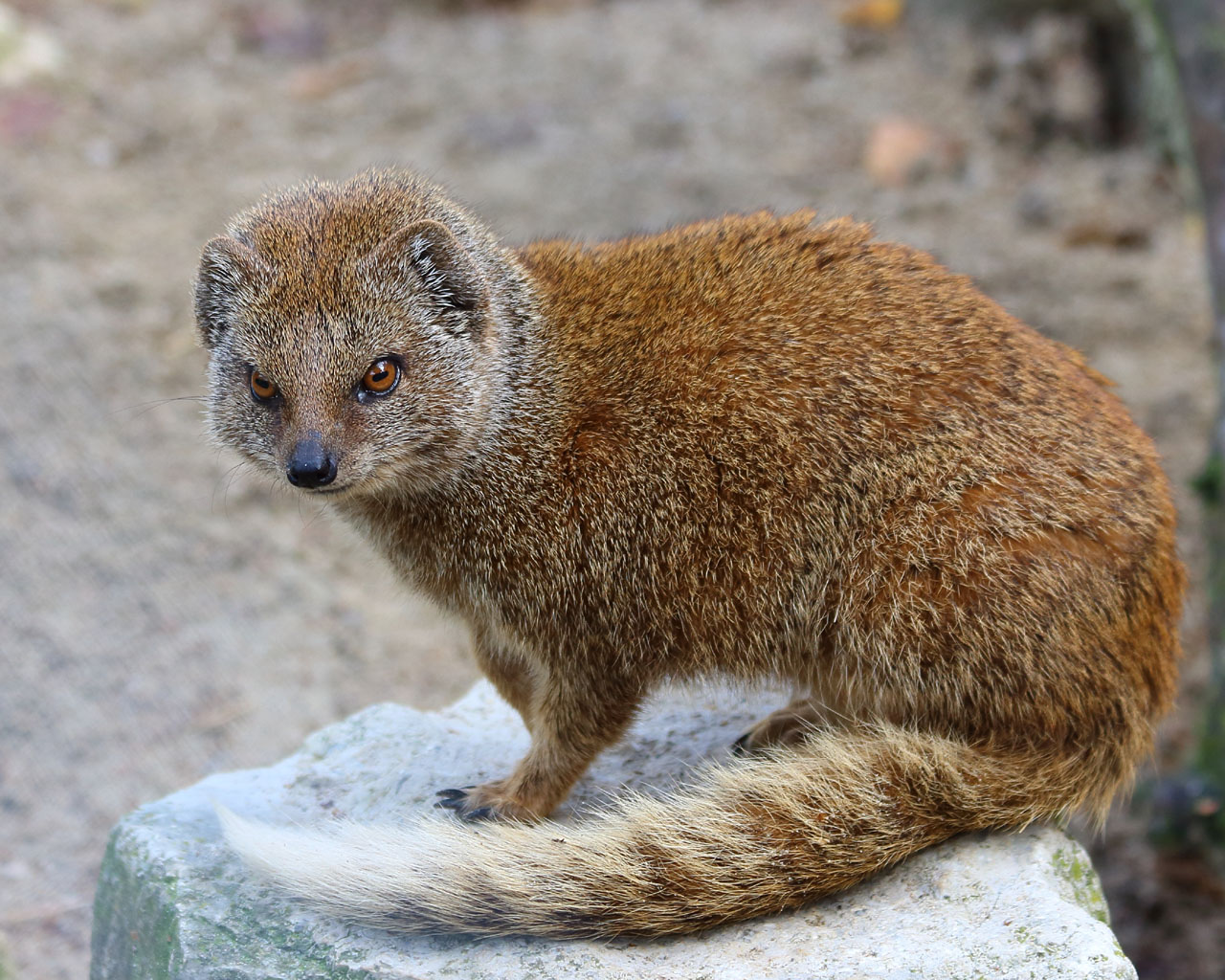
A Mongoose

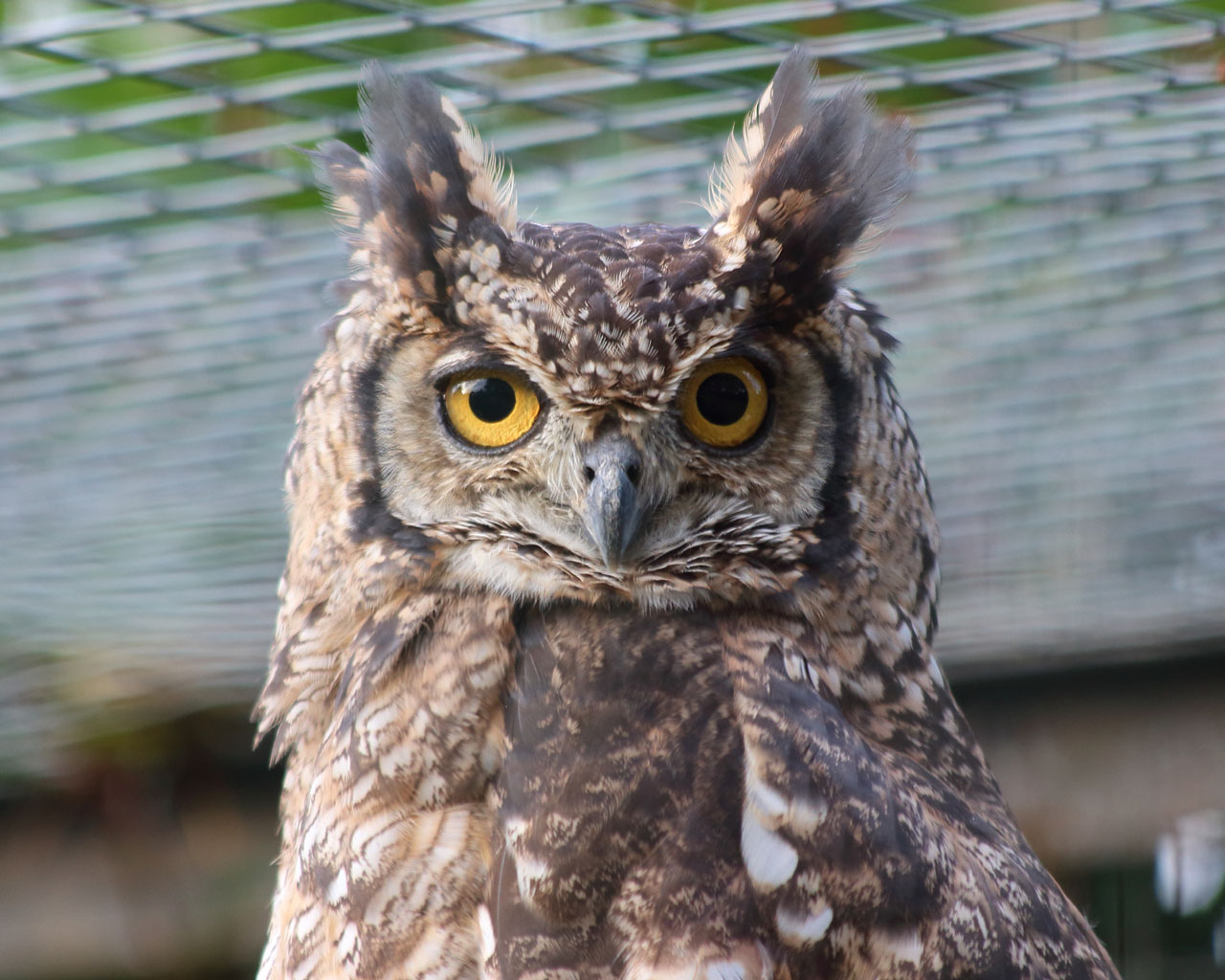
A Grand Duke African Owl

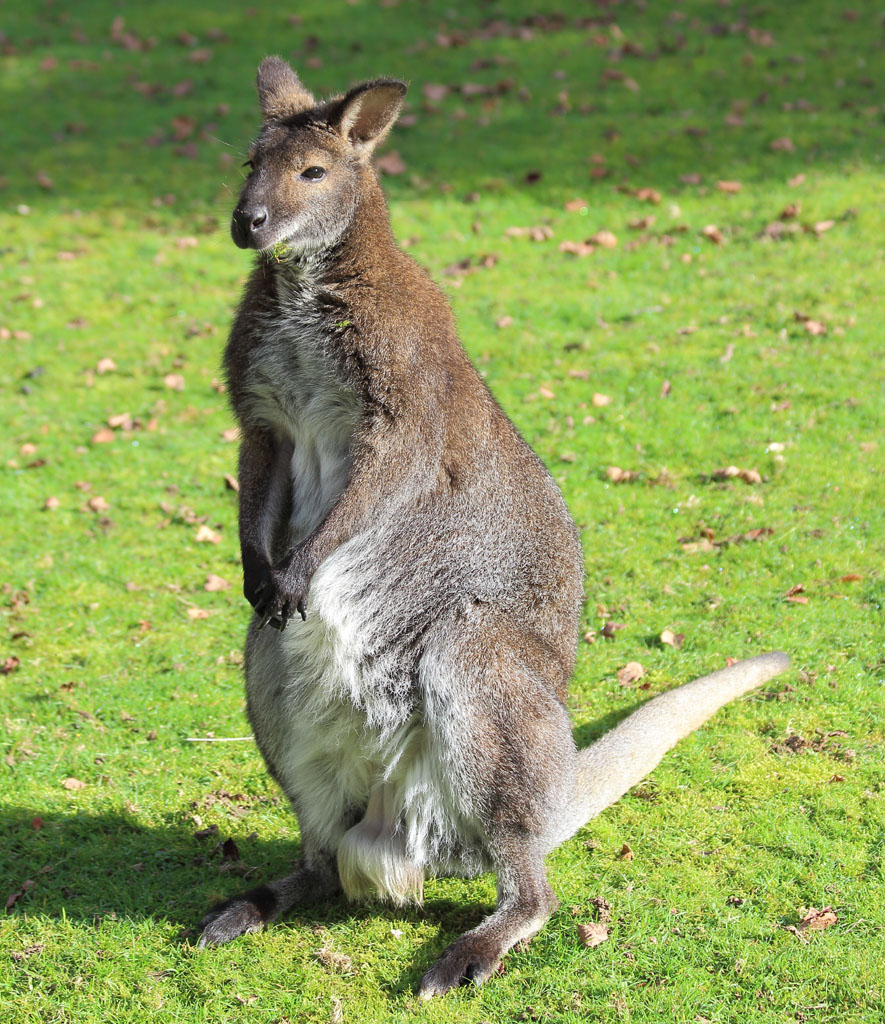
A Bennett's Wallaby

== Notable People linked to the commune ==
- Thomas Joseph-Armand Caillat, religious goldsmith, lived in the commune.

== See also ==
- Communes of the Isère department
