= Les Abrets en Dauphiné =

- Commune
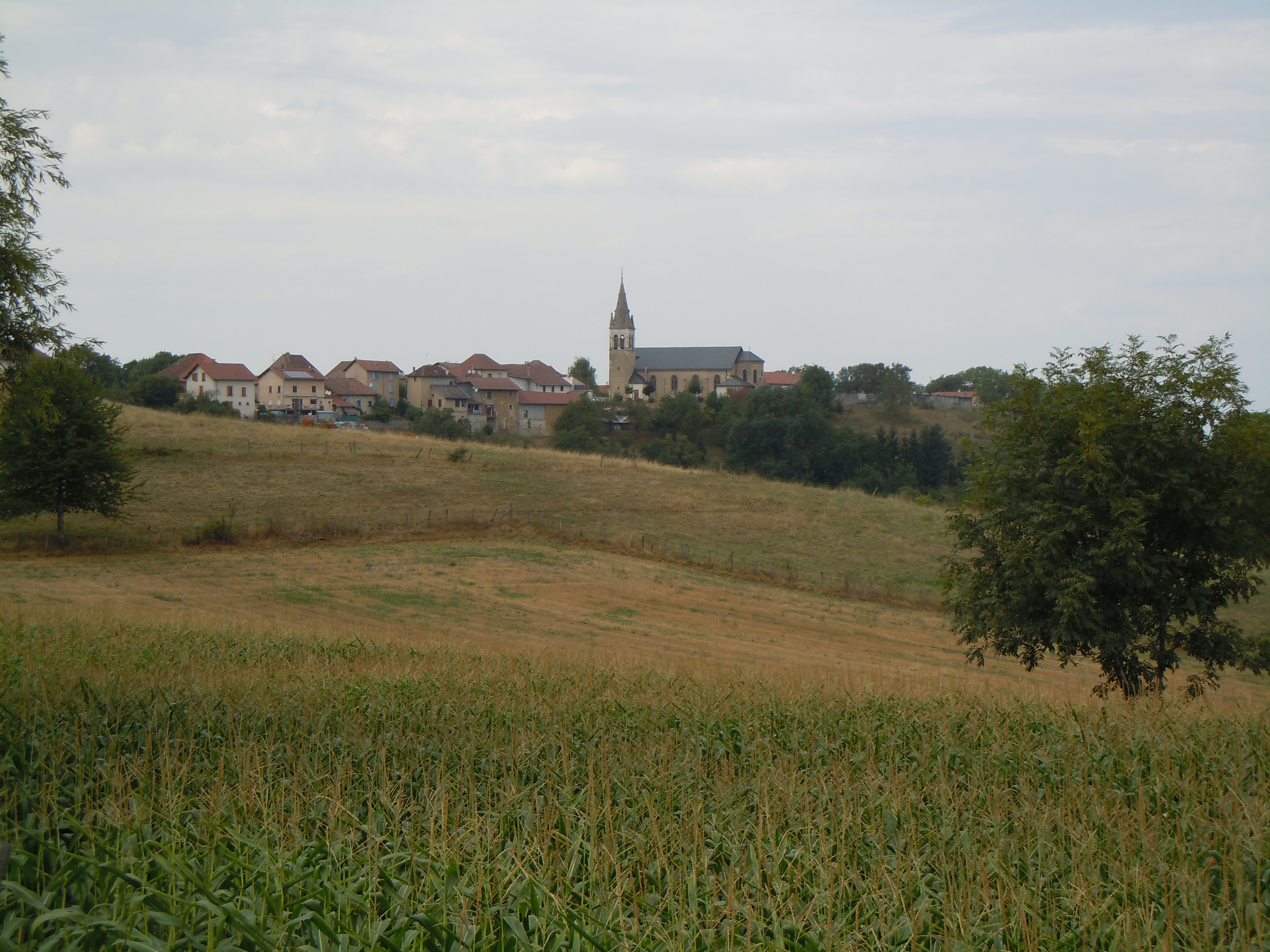
- A general view of the village of La Bâtie-Divisin
- Location of Les Abrets en Dauphiné
- Location within France Location within Auvergne-Rhône-Alpes
- Coordinates: 45°32′13″N 5°35′10″E
- Country: France
- Region: Auvergne-Rhône-Alpes
- Department: Isère
- Arrondissement: La Tour-du-Pin
- Canton: Chartreuse-Guiers
- Intercommunality: CC Les Vals du Dauphiné

Government
  - Mayor (2020–2026): Benjamin Gastaldello
- Area^{1}: 27.41 km^{2} (10.58 sq mi)
- Population (2023): 6,850
  - Density: 250/km^{2} (647/sq mi)
- Time zone: UTC+01:00 (CET)
  - Summer (DST): UTC+02:00 (CEST)
- INSEE/Postal code: 38001 /38490
- ^{1} French Land Register data, which excludes lakes, ponds, glaciers > 1 km^{2} (0.386 sq mi or 247 acres) and river estuaries.

Les Abrets en Dauphiné (French pronunciation: [lez‿abʁɛ ɑ̃ dofine], literally Les Abrets in Dauphiné; Arpitan: Los Âbrèts-en-Dôfenât) is a commune in the Isère department of southeastern France. The municipality was established on 1 January 2016 and consists of the former communes of Les Abrets, La Bâtie-Divisin and Fitilieu.

== Population ==
Population data refer to the commune in its geography as of January 2025.

Historical population
Year	Pop.	±% p.a.
1968	3,897	—
1975	4,080	+0.66%
1982	4,608	+1.75%
1990	4,751	+0.38%
1999	4,782	+0.07%
2007	5,452	+1.65%
2012	6,298	+2.93%
2017	6,311	+0.04%
2023	6,850	+1.38%
Source: INSEE

== See also ==
- Communes of the Isère department
