= Hôtel de Ville, Voiron =

Town hall in Voiron, France

Hôtel de Ville
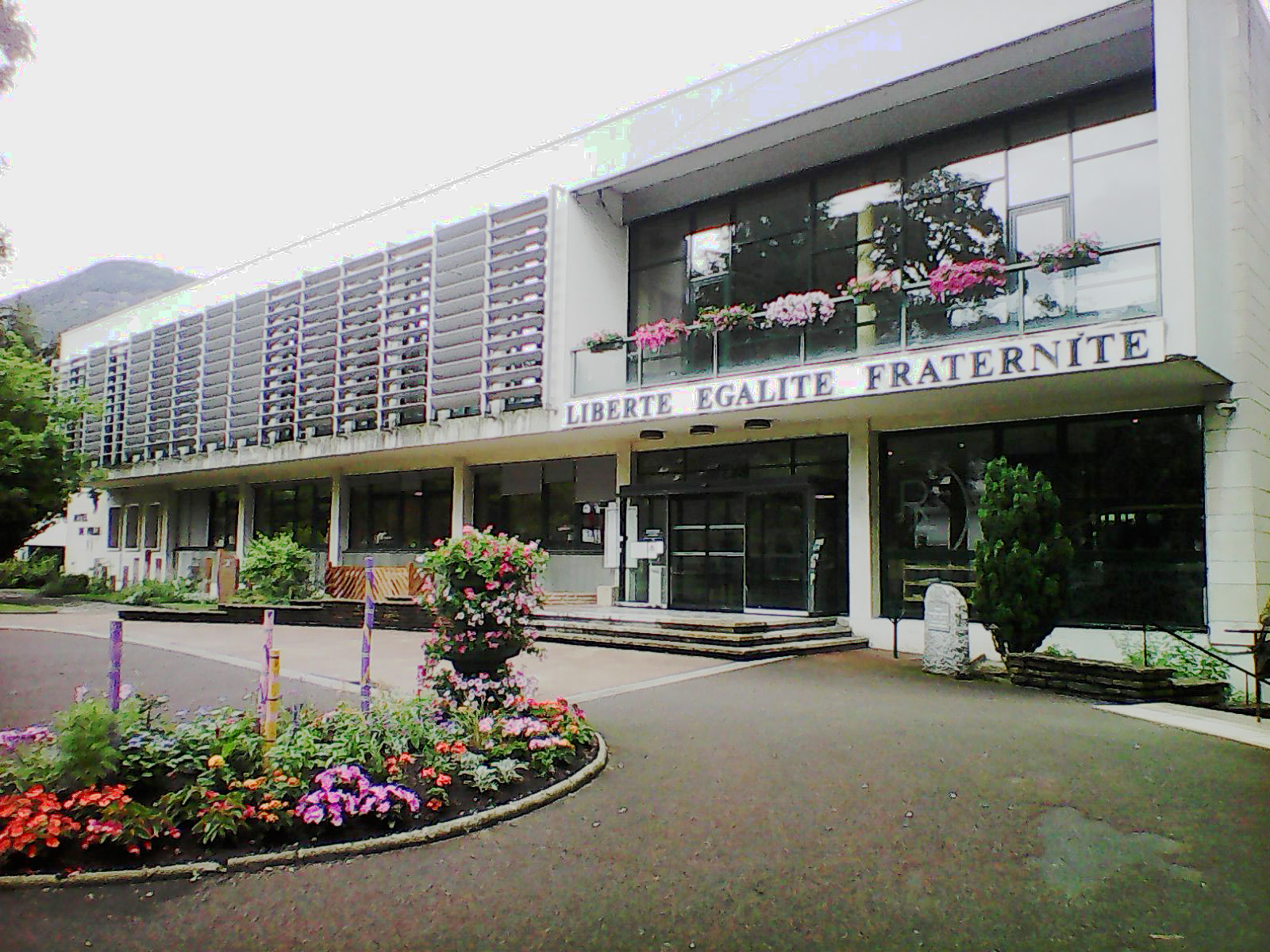
- The main frontage of the Hôtel de Ville in June 2018
- Interactive map of the Hôtel de Ville area

General information
- Type: City hall
- Architectural style: Modern style
- Location: Voiron, France
- Coordinates: 45.3627°N 5.5915°E
- Completed: 1966

The Hôtel de Ville (French pronunciation: [otɛl də vil], City Hall) is a municipal building in Voiron, Isère, in southeastern France, standing on Rue Mainssieux.

== History ==
The old town hall

Under the ancien régime, the consuls rented premises on the Grand Rue. This arrangement continued until 1751, when they decided to lease a house known as the Maison des Dauphins on what is now Place Stalingrad from Canon Gaspar Penon. In 1782, ownership of the house passed by inheritance to the treasurer-general of the province of Dauphiny, Charles Aubin Rage de Voissant, and his son, Jean-Baptiste de Voissant. The consuls acquired ownership of the property outright in 1790 when Jean-Baptiste emigrated the United States to escape the French Revolution. The new elected town council then demolished the Maison des Dauphins and commissioned a new building on the same site. The new building, which originally consisted of a single block, was designed in the neoclassical style, built in brick with a cement render finish and was formally accepted by the council on 17 June 1793.

The complex was expanded by adding a second block at some point in the 19th century. There were then two blocks, one facing onto the street and the other one projected forward. Both blocks were arcaded on the ground floor with large Doric order columns supporting the upper two floors, which were fenestrated with casement windows. The complex was initially used as a market hall but was enhanced, in 1925, by a curved entrance façade at the corner of the two blocks. It contained a doorway flanked by a pair of oculi on the ground floor, three square-headed windows on the first floor and three segmental-headed windows on the second floor, all surmounted by a clock with a segmental pediment. In 1953, the ground floor was enclosed to create accommodation for council officials, and part of the building was allocated for garaging the fire engines.

In 1960, following significant population growth, the council led by the mayor, Raymond Tézier, decided to commission a modern town hall. The site they selected was occupied by the former home of a major benefactor to the town, Marie-Thérèse Castelbon, who had left her house and garden to the council before she died in 1920. The house was located at the north end of the Parc Castelbon (now le Jardin de Ville), a large park with 300 species of trees spread out over 30,000 square metres (320,000 sq ft). A war memorial, intended to commemorate the lives of local service personnel who had died in the First World War had been installed at the south end of the park in October 1924, and a swimming pool had been installed at the north end of the park in 1954.

Marie-Thérèse Castelbon's home was demolished to make way for the new town hall. The new building was designed in the modern style, built in concrete and glass and was officially opened on 8 July 1966. The design of the new building involved an asymmetrical main frontage of seven bays facing onto Cours Becquart Castelbon. On the ground floor, the entrance was in the second bay on the right and the remainder of the floor was fenestrated by plate glass. The first floor was jettied out over the pavement: the left-hand section of five bays was fenestrated by casement windows with horizontal slats, while the right-hand section of two bays was recessed and fenestrated by plate glass. Internally, the principal room was the Salon d'Honneur (room of honour). A likeness of Marie-Thérèse Castelbon, in the form of a bust on a pedestal, was installed in front of the town hall to commemorate her generosity to the town.
