= Bilieu =

- Commune
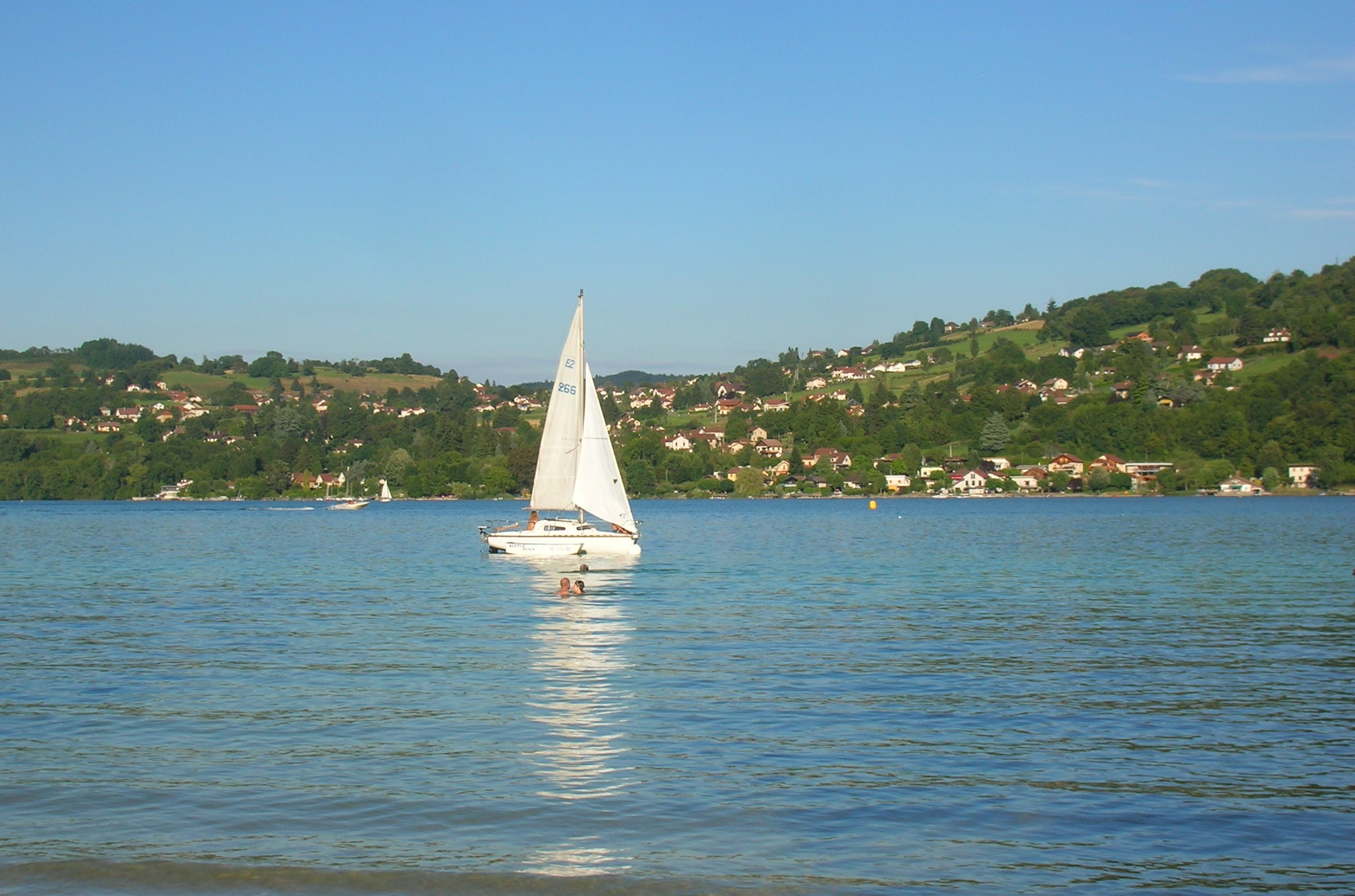
- The Lac de Paladru with Bilieu in the background
- Location of Bilieu
- Location within France Location within Auvergne-Rhône-Alpes
- Coordinates: 45°27′00″N 5°33′02″E
- Country: France
- Region: Auvergne-Rhône-Alpes
- Department: Isère
- Arrondissement: La Tour-du-Pin
- Canton: Le Grand-Lemps
- Intercommunality: CA Pays Voironnais

Government
  - Mayor (2020–2026): Jean-Yves Penet
- Area^{1}: 6.71 km^{2} (2.59 sq mi)
- Highest elevation: 810 m (2,660 ft)
- Lowest elevation: 488 m (1,601 ft)
- Population (2023): 1,578
  - Density: 235/km^{2} (609/sq mi)
- Time zone: UTC+01:00 (CET)
  - Summer (DST): UTC+02:00 (CEST)
- INSEE/Postal code: 38043 /38850
- ^{1} French Land Register data, which excludes lakes, ponds, glaciers > 1 km^{2} (0.386 sq mi or 247 acres) and river estuaries.

Bilieu (French pronunciation: [biljø]) is a commune in the Isère department in southeastern France.

== Population ==
Historical population

Year	Pop.	±% p.a.
1831	537	—
1841	634	+1.67%
1851	575	−0.97%
1861	549	−0.46%
1872	549	+0.00%
1881	491	−1.23%
1891	465	−0.54%
1901	437	−0.62%
1911	462	+0.56%
1921	417	−1.02%
1931	376	−1.03%
1946	313	−1.22%

Year	Pop.	±% p.a.
1954	290	−0.95%
1962	301	+0.47%
1968	296	−0.28%
1975	326	+1.39%
1982	510	+6.60%
1990	741	+4.78%
1999	922	+2.46%
2007	1,152	+2.82%
2012	1,359	+3.36%
2017	1,544	+2.59%
2023	1,578	+0.36%

Source: EHESS and INSEE

== See also ==
- Communes of the Isère department
- Lac de Paladru
