= Le Pin, Isère =

Le Pin
- Part of Villages du Lac de Paladru
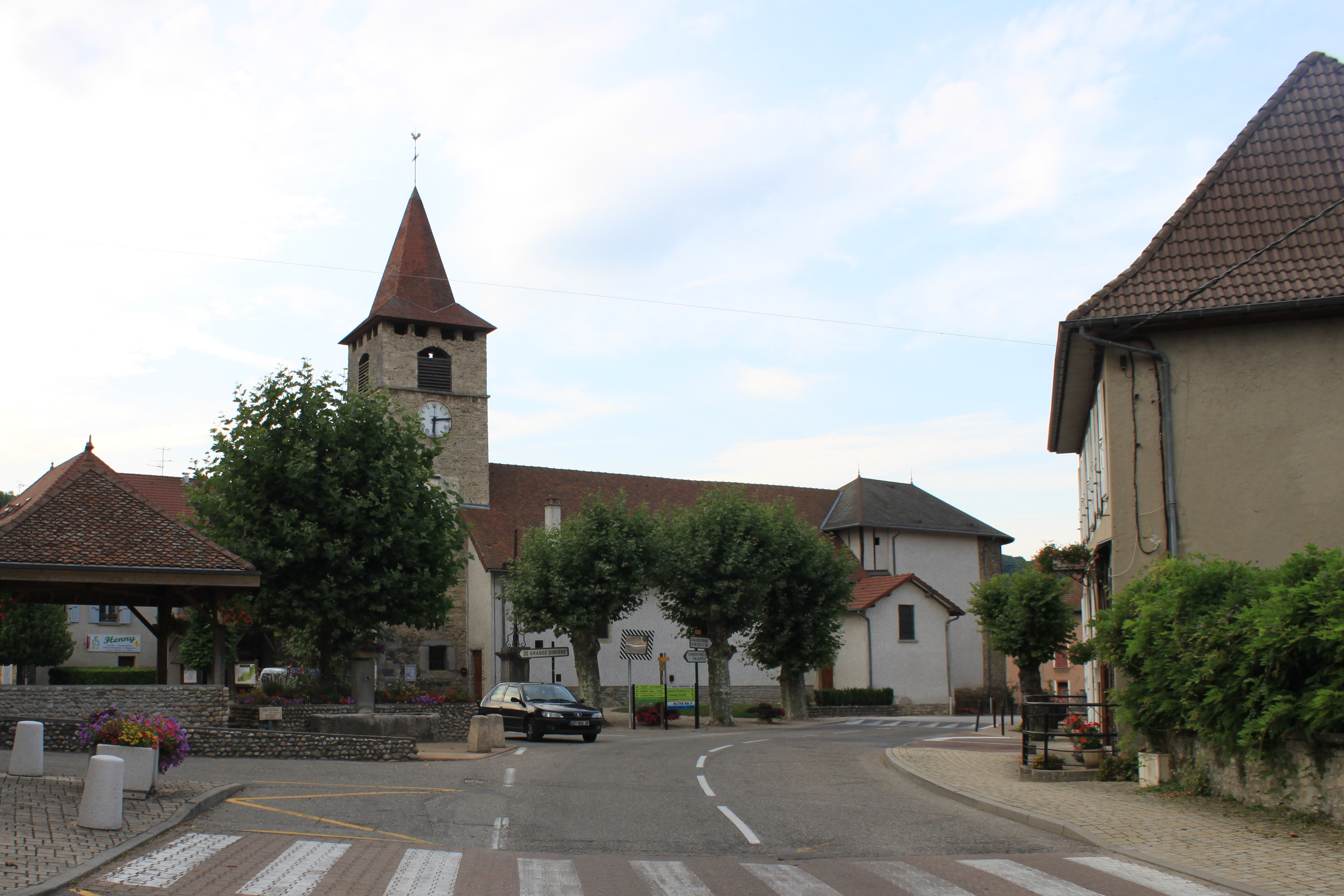
- Location of Le Pin
- Location within France Location within Auvergne-Rhône-Alpes
- Coordinates: 45°27′27″N 5°30′23″E
- Country: France
- Region: Auvergne-Rhône-Alpes
- Department: Isère
- Arrondissement: La Tour-du-Pin
- Canton: Le Grand-Lemps
- Commune: Villages du Lac de Paladru
- Area^{1}: 9.6 km^{2} (3.7 sq mi)
- Elevation: 510 m (1,670 ft)
- Highest elevation: 767 m (2,516 ft)
- Lowest elevation: 487 m (1,598 ft)
- Population (2022): 1,314
  - Density: 140/km^{2} (350/sq mi)
- Time zone: UTC+01:00 (CET)
  - Summer (DST): UTC+02:00 (CEST)
- Postal code: 38730
- ^{1} French Land Register data, which excludes lakes, ponds, glaciers > 1 km^{2} (0.386 sq mi or 247 acres) and river estuaries.

Le Pin (French pronunciation: [lə pɛ̃]) is a former commune in the Isère department in southeastern France. On 1 January 2017, it was merged into the new commune Villages du Lac de Paladru.

== Population ==
Historical population

| Year | Pop. | ±% p.a. |
|---|---|---|
| 1800 | 807 | — |
| 1821 | 980 | +0.93% |
| 1846 | 1,140 | +0.61% |
| 1872 | 860 | −1.08% |
| 1901 | 738 | −0.53% |
| 1926 | 610 | −0.76% |
| 1946 | 615 | +0.04% |
| 1962 | 549 | −0.71% |

| Year | Pop. | ±% p.a. |
|---|---|---|
| 1968 | 553 | +0.12% |
| 1975 | 475 | −2.15% |
| 1982 | 636 | +4.26% |
| 1990 | 850 | +3.69% |
| 1999 | 974 | +1.52% |
| 2006 | 1,160 | +2.53% |
| 2022 | 1,314 | +0.78% |

Source: EHESS and INSEE

== See also ==
- Communes of the Isère department
- Lac de Paladru
