= Voiron =

Voiron Vouèron (Arpitan)
- Commune
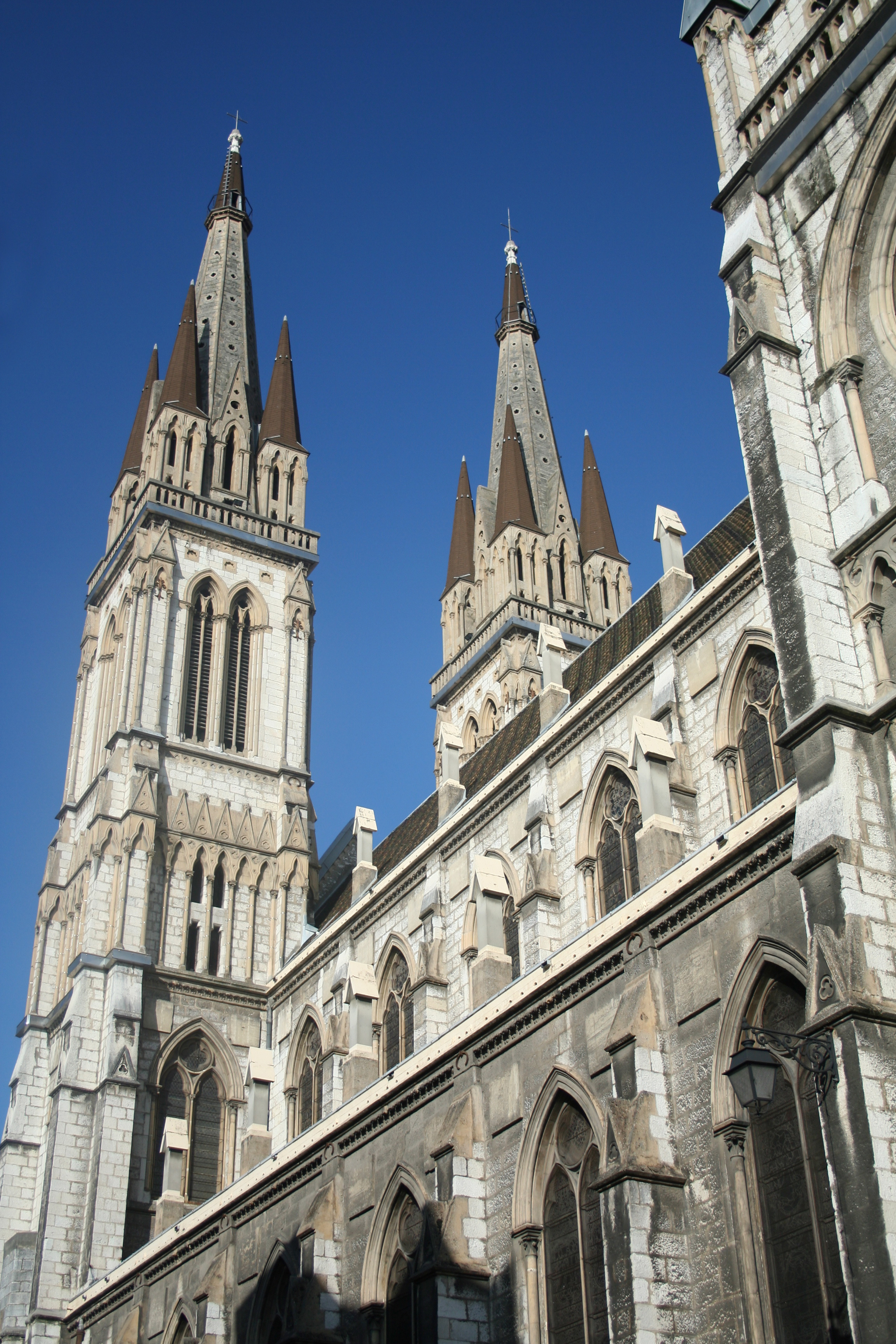
- Church of Saint-Bruno de Voiron

- Coat of arms
- Location of Voiron
- Location within France Location within Auvergne-Rhône-Alpes
- Coordinates: 45°21′51″N 5°35′26″E
- Country: France
- Region: Auvergne-Rhône-Alpes
- Department: Isère
- Arrondissement: Grenoble
- Canton: Voiron
- Intercommunality: Pays Voironnais

Government
  - Mayor (2020–2026): Julien Polat
- Area^{1}: 21.9 km^{2} (8.5 sq mi)
- Elevation: 290 m (950 ft)
- Highest elevation: 846 m (2,776 ft)
- Lowest elevation: 222 m (728 ft)
- Population (2023): 21,847
  - Density: 998/km^{2} (2,580/sq mi)
- Time zone: UTC+01:00 (CET)
  - Summer (DST): UTC+02:00 (CEST)
- INSEE/Postal code: 38563 /38500
- ^{1} French Land Register data, which excludes lakes, ponds, glaciers > 1 km^{2} (0.386 sq mi or 247 acres) and river estuaries.

Voiron (French pronunciation: [vwaʁˈɔ̃]; Arpitan: Vouèron) is a commune (French municipality) in the Isère department in southeastern France. It is the capital of the canton of Voiron and has been part of the Grenoble-Alpes Métropole since 2010. Voiron is located 25 km (16 mi) northwest of Grenoble and 85 km (53 mi) southeast of Lyon. Its roughly 20,000 inhabitants are named Voironnais in French.

Voiron, along with Chambéry and Grenoble, is a gateway city of the Chartreuse Mountains in the Auvergne-Rhône-Alpes region.

== History ==
Voiron had been a part of the County of Savoy in the Middle Ages. In the Treaty of Paris (1355) the count exchanged Voiron and the rest of the region between the rivers Rhône and Isère (watered by the Guiers Mort) for Faucigny and Gex from France.

=== 17th and 18th centuries ===
In 1700, the capital of the Chartreuse massif and its surrounding area had about 1,200 inhabitants and more than a hundred of them worked in the processing of hemp.

Since the beginning of the century, production had been organized around the Voironnaise factory and canvases were marked to certify their origin. The city acquired a great reputation thanks to its paintings resulting from a secular know-how. The privileges granted by Louis XII disappeared during the French Revolution. However, the production of canvas continued, and their reputation allowed Voiron to maintain this activity under the First Empire due in large part to purchases by the army.

=== 19th century ===
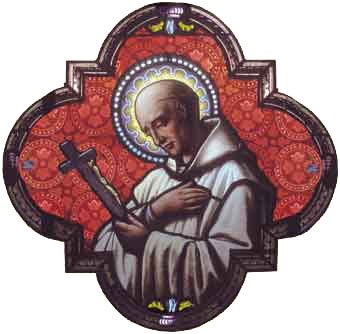
Saint Bruno, founder of the Carthusian Order to whom the church of Voiron is dedicated

The nineteenth century saw the decline of the era of canvas in Voiron because of the scarcity of linen and cotton, and because of the disappearance of the sailing navy which had been a large consumer of canvasses. Voiron came to be known for its fine silks, sought after by European royalties. Voiron then benefited from a female workforce, housed at the factory and often poorly paid. Voiron also gained religious influence marked by the 1876 erection of the Saint-Bruno church of Gothic Revival style by a first magistrate. A statue representing the Virgin Mary and the infant Jesus, a tribute to Notre-Dame-de-France Puy-en-Velay, was also erected.

=== 20th century ===
The company Skis Rossignol was founded in 1907 by Abel Rossignol. Entire families of Voiron, along with Italian immigrants who arrived en masse at the beginning of the century, worked in these factories. On the eve of the First World War, the silk-weaving business used nearly 3,000 looms. At the same time, the rise of paper mills on the banks of the Morge, the river crossing the small town, attracted workers to the city. The company Radiall was founded as well and the population of Voiron grew past 15,000.

=== 21st century ===
Voiron remains a significant economic and administrative center of the department of Isère. Voiron has sought to keep its independence from its much larger neighbor, the Grenoble conurbation. Voiron survived a difficult conversion after the departure of companies Rossignol and Johnson & Johnson. Pays Voironnais is working to attract new jobs aimed at limiting the dormitory phenomenon already affecting the suburbs of Voiron. However, because of the urban sprawl between Voreppe and Voiron, this town has been considered by the National Institute of Statistics and Economic Studies (INSEE) as belonging to the Grenoble-Alpes Métropole since 2010.

== Geography ==
The city is located 25 km (16 mi) northwest of Grenoble and 85 km (53 mi) southeast of Lyon. Voiron is at an altitude of 290 metres (950 feet), on the Morge (a tributary of the Isère).

== Population ==
Historical population

Year	Pop.	±% p.a.
1793	4,905	—
1800	5,399	+1.38%
1806	5,918	+1.54%
1821	6,175	+0.28%
1831	6,924	+1.15%
1836	7,571	+1.80%
1841	7,694	+0.32%
1846	8,255	+1.42%
1851	8,480	+0.54%
1856	8,852	+0.86%
1861	9,637	+1.71%
1866	10,089	+0.92%
1872	10,262	+0.28%
1876	11,064	+1.90%
1881	11,955	+1.56%
1886	11,954	−0.00%
1891	11,604	−0.59%
1896	12,022	+0.71%
1901	12,625	+0.98%

Year	Pop.	±% p.a.
1906	12,083	−0.87%
1911	12,503	+0.69%
1921	11,931	−0.47%
1926	12,746	+1.33%
1931	12,847	+0.16%
1936	12,444	−0.64%
1946	12,598	+0.12%
1954	13,551	+0.92%
1962	14,437	+0.79%
1968	17,587	+3.34%
1975	19,420	+1.43%
1982	18,911	−0.38%
1990	18,686	−0.15%
1999	19,794	+0.64%
2007	20,689	+0.55%
2012	19,925	−0.75%
2017	20,108	+0.18%
2023	21,847	+1.39%

Source: EHESS and INSEE (1968–2023)

== Sights ==
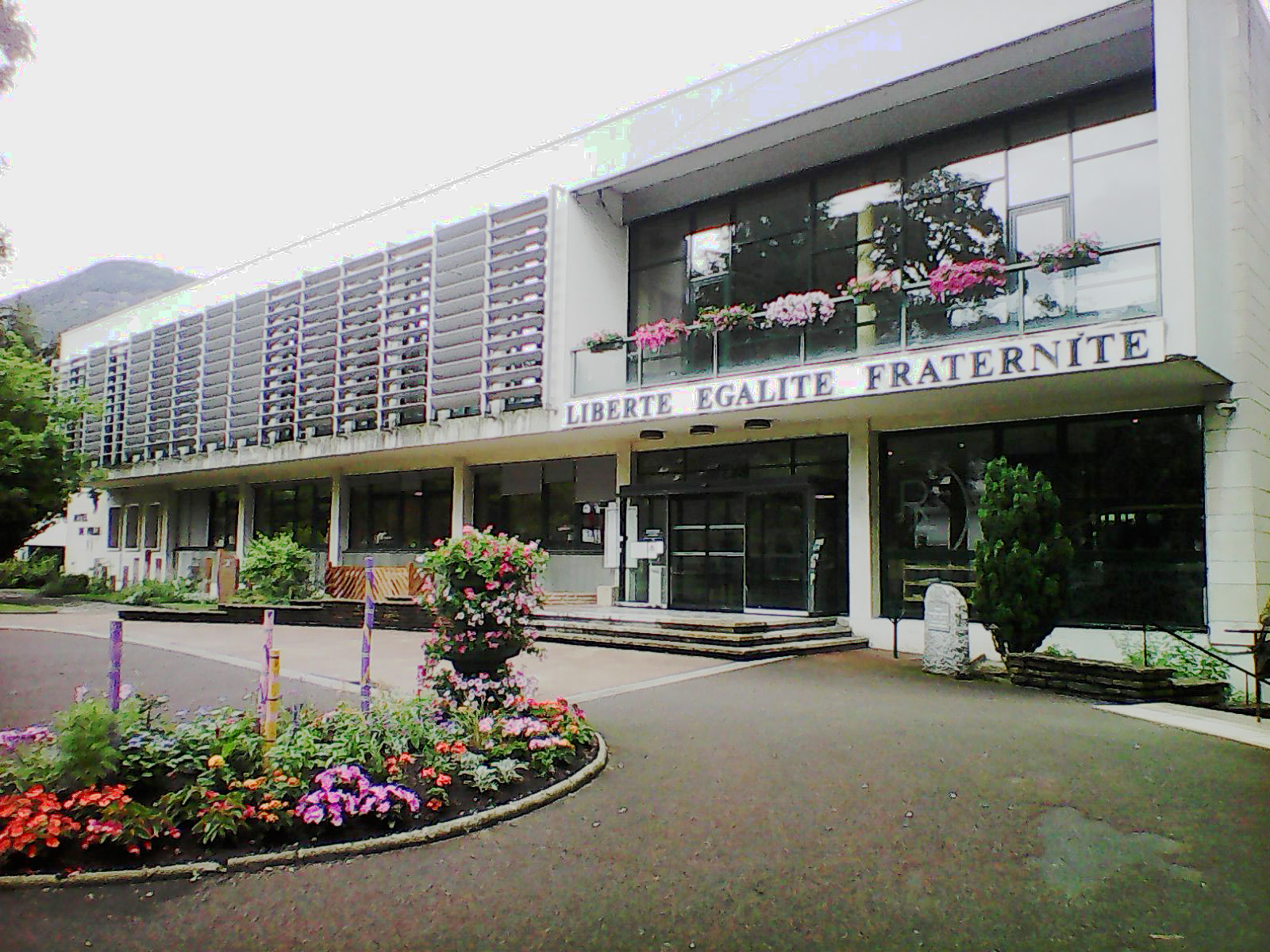
The Hôtel de Ville

The church of St Bruno was built between 1864 and 1873 at the expense of the monks of the Grande Chartreuse. Voiron was the starting-point of the steam tramways to Saint-Laurent-du-Pont, 12 miles (19 km) (for the Grande Chartreuse), and to Charavines, over 10 miles (16 km) (for the Lac de Paladru).

The distillery Chartreuse Cellars is a popular tourist destination. It is the longest liqueur cellar in the world. The cellar is open year-round with English guided tours available during June, July, and August.

The Hôtel de Ville was completed in 1966.

== Economy ==
Voiron is a manufacturing town, and it contains numerous factories. Companies include: Rossignol (skis), Radiall Connections, Antésite (a liquorice-flavored drink), Chartreuse liquor cellars, Bonnat Chocolatier (since 1884), and Allaman (manufacturing and transporting of petrol tanks).

== Education ==
Secondary (high school)

- Lycée Édouard Herriot
- Lycée Ferdinand Buisson
- Lycée agricole La Martelière

== Notable people ==
- Dantès Dailiang (born 1978), singer-songwriter
- Christophe Bouchut (born 1966), race driver, 24 Hours of Le Mans winner
- Mélina Robert-Michon (born 1979), discus thrower
- Fabien Centonze (born 1996), footballer

== Twin towns – sister cities ==
Voiron is twinned with:

- Bassano del Grappa, Italy
- Droitwich Spa, England, United Kingdom
- Herford, Germany
- Šibenik, Croatia

== See also ==
- SO Voiron – rugby union team
- Auguste Marie
