= Villages du Lac de Paladru =

- Commune
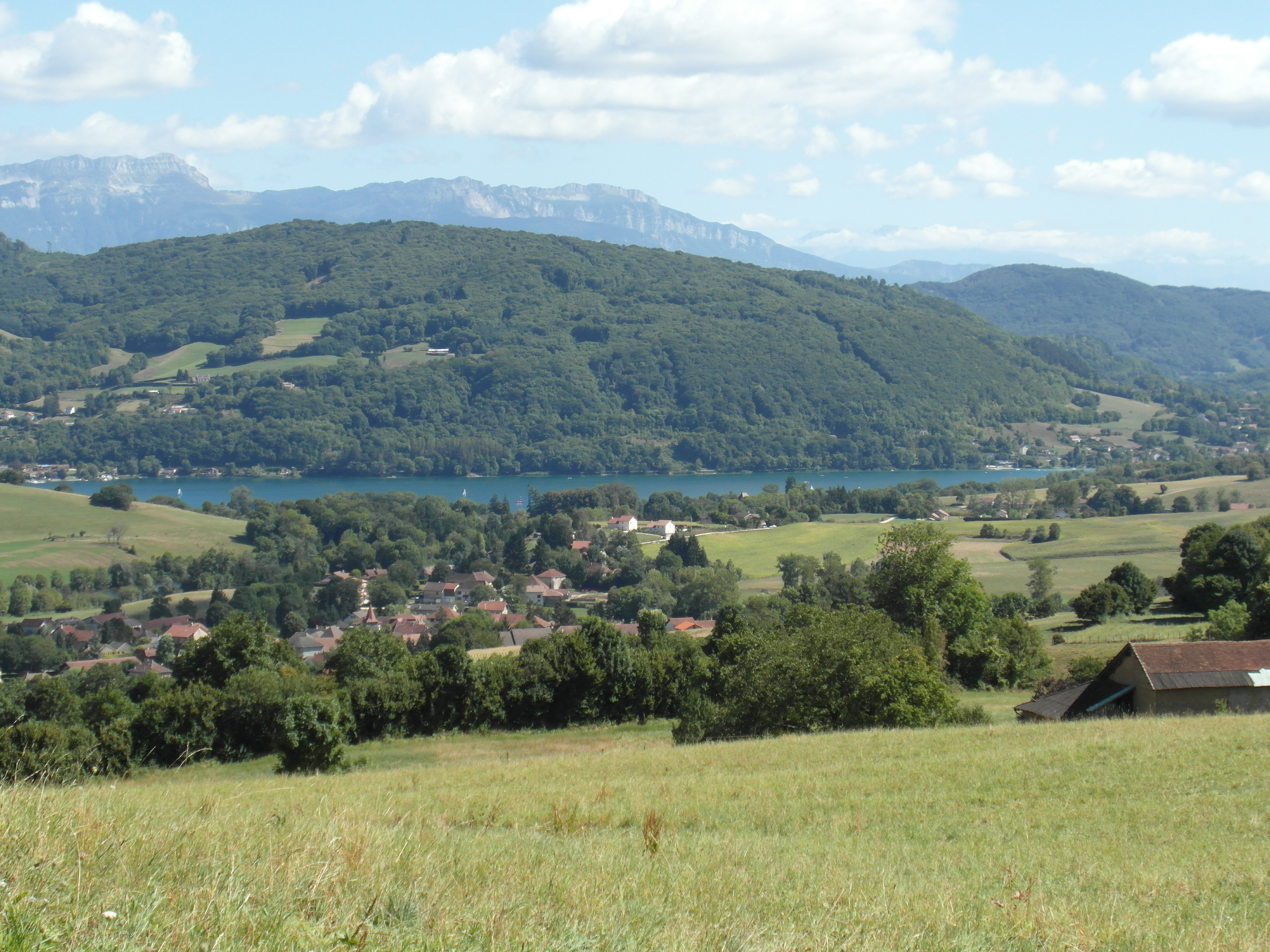
- Paladru in 2010
- Location of Villages du Lac de Paladru
- Location within France Location within Auvergne-Rhône-Alpes
- Coordinates: 45°28′26″N 5°33′04″E
- Country: France
- Region: Auvergne-Rhône-Alpes
- Department: Isère
- Arrondissement: La Tour-du-Pin
- Canton: Le Grand-Lemps
- Intercommunality: CA Pays Voironnais
- Area^{1}: 21.24 km^{2} (8.20 sq mi)
- Population (2023): 2,598
  - Density: 122.3/km^{2} (316.8/sq mi)
- Time zone: UTC+01:00 (CET)
  - Summer (DST): UTC+02:00 (CEST)
- INSEE/Postal code: 38292 /38850
- ^{1} French Land Register data, which excludes lakes, ponds, glaciers > 1 km^{2} (0.386 sq mi or 247 acres) and river estuaries.

Villages du Lac de Paladru is a commune in the department of Isère, southeastern France. The municipality was established on 1 January 2017 by merger of the former communes of Paladru (the seat) and Le Pin.

== Population ==
Population data refer to the commune in its geography as of January 2025.

Historical population
Year	Pop.	±% p.a.
1968	1,021	—
1975	978	−0.61%
1982	1,257	+3.65%
1990	1,620	+3.22%
1999	1,837	+1.41%
2007	2,221	+2.40%
2012	2,362	+1.24%
2017	2,485	+1.02%
2023	2,598	+0.74%
Source: INSEE

== See also ==
- Communes of the Isère department
