= Fitilieu =

Fitilieu Fetiliœ (Arpitan)
- Part of Les Abrets-en-Dauphiné
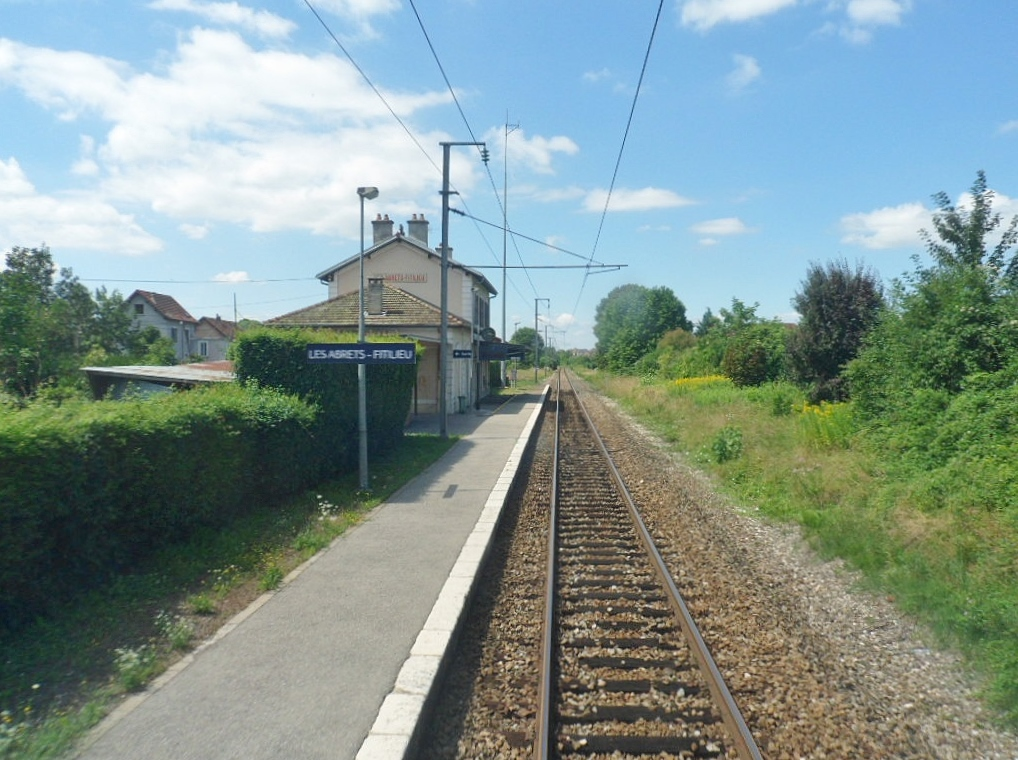
- Train station
- Location of Fitilieu
- Location within France Location within Auvergne-Rhône-Alpes
- Coordinates: 45°32′51″N 5°33′43″E
- Country: France
- Region: Auvergne-Rhône-Alpes
- Department: Isère
- Arrondissement: La Tour-du-Pin
- Canton: Chartreuse-Guiers
- Commune: Les Abrets-en-Dauphiné
- Area^{1}: 10.01 km^{2} (3.86 sq mi)
- Highest elevation: 407 m (1,335 ft)
- Lowest elevation: 280 m (920 ft)
- Population (2022): 2,071
  - Density: 206.9/km^{2} (535.9/sq mi)
- Time zone: UTC+01:00 (CET)
  - Summer (DST): UTC+02:00 (CEST)
- Postal code: 38490
- ^{1} French Land Register data, which excludes lakes, ponds, glaciers > 1 km^{2} (0.386 sq mi or 247 acres) and river estuaries.

Fitilieu (French pronunciation: [fitiljø]; Arpitan: Fetiliœ [fə.ti.ˈʎø]) is a former commune in the Isère department in southeastern France. On 1 January 2016, it was merged into the new commune of Les Abrets-en-Dauphiné.

== Geography ==
The Bourbre forms most of the commune's western border.

== Population ==
Historical population

| Year | Pop. | ±% p.a. |
|---|---|---|
| 1793 | 870 | — |
| 1821 | 1,078 | +0.77% |
| 1846 | 1,502 | +1.34% |
| 1872 | 1,246 | −0.72% |
| 1901 | 1,124 | −0.35% |
| 1926 | 939 | −0.72% |
| 1946 | 953 | +0.07% |
| 1962 | 1,102 | +0.91% |

| Year | Pop. | ±% p.a. |
|---|---|---|
| 1968 | 1,046 | −0.87% |
| 1975 | 1,083 | +0.50% |
| 1982 | 1,224 | +1.76% |
| 1990 | 1,262 | +0.38% |
| 1999 | 1,275 | +0.11% |
| 2007 | 1,550 | +2.47% |
| 2012 | 1,799 | +3.02% |
| 2022 | 2,071 | +1.42% |

Source: EHESS and INSEE

== Economy ==
Hermès leather goods factory

== Attractions ==
- Fauves Zoological Park
- Church of Saint-Pierre

== See also ==
- Communes of the Isère department
