= Paladru =

Commune in Isère, France

- Part of Villages du Lac de Paladru
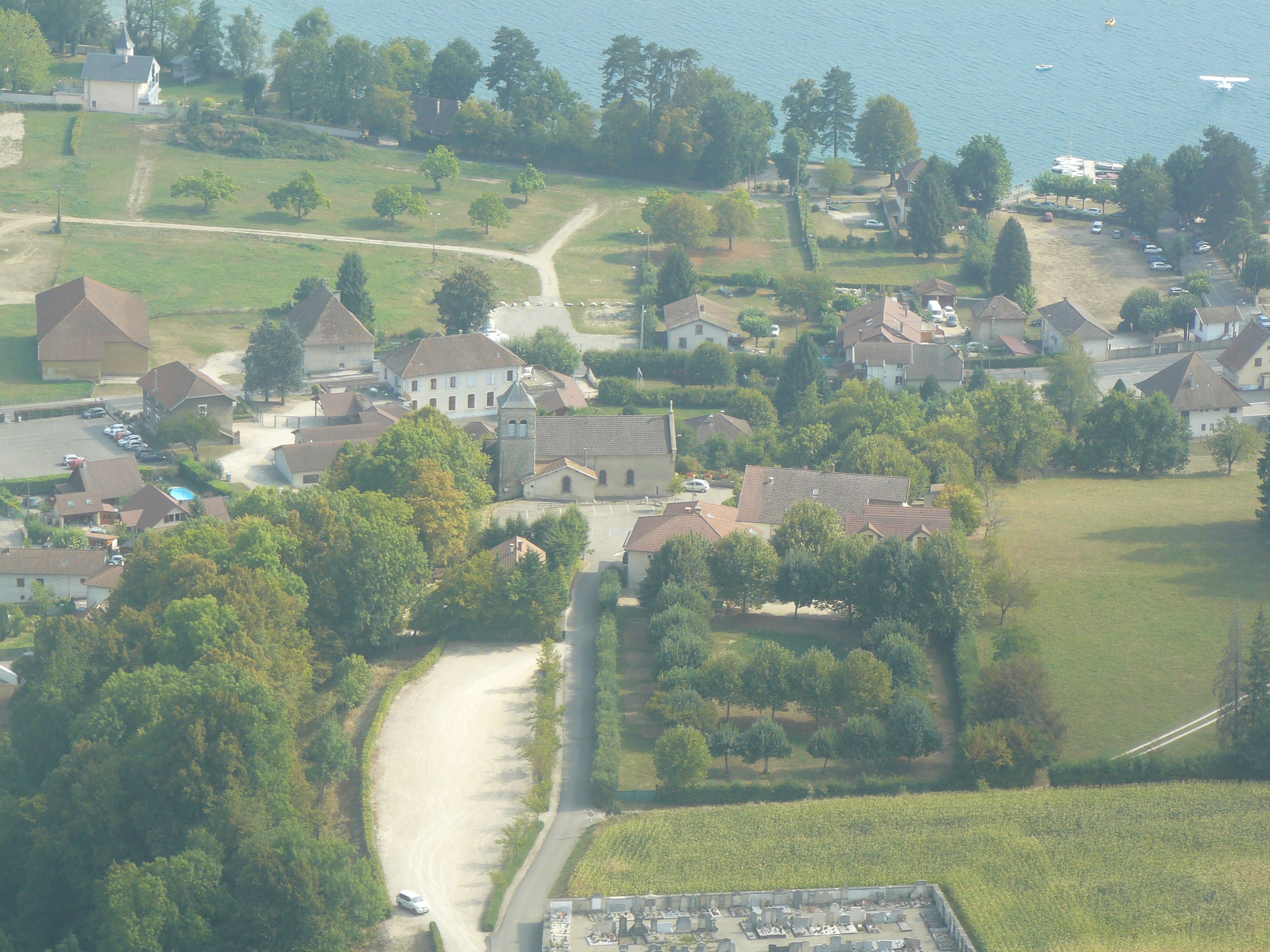
- VILLAGE DE PALADRU

- Coat of arms
- Location of Paladru
- Location within France Location within Auvergne-Rhône-Alpes
- Coordinates: 45°28′34″N 5°33′14″E
- Country: France
- Region: Auvergne-Rhône-Alpes
- Department: Isère
- Arrondissement: La Tour-du-Pin
- Canton: Le Grand-Lemps
- Commune: Villages du Lac de Paladru
- Area^{1}: 11.64 km^{2} (4.49 sq mi)
- Elevation: 503 m (1,650 ft)
- Highest elevation: 711 m (2,333 ft)
- Lowest elevation: 488 m (1,601 ft)
- Population (2022): 1,300
  - Density: 110/km^{2} (290/sq mi)
- Time zone: UTC+01:00 (CET)
  - Summer (DST): UTC+02:00 (CEST)
- Postal code: 38850
- ^{1} French Land Register data, which excludes lakes, ponds, glaciers > 1 km^{2} (0.386 sq mi or 247 acres) and river estuaries.

Paladru (French pronunciation: [paladʁy]) is a former commune in the Isère department in southeastern France. On 1 January 2017, it was merged into the new commune Villages du Lac de Paladru.

== Population ==
Historical population

| Year | Pop. | ±% p.a. |
|---|---|---|
| 1793 | 599 | — |
| 1821 | 1,023 | +1.93% |
| 1846 | 1,043 | +0.08% |
| 1872 | 908 | −0.53% |
| 1901 | 662 | −1.08% |
| 1926 | 501 | −1.11% |
| 1946 | 489 | −0.12% |
| 1962 | 408 | −1.13% |

| Year | Pop. | ±% p.a. |
|---|---|---|
| 1968 | 468 | +2.31% |
| 1975 | 503 | +1.04% |
| 1982 | 621 | +3.06% |
| 1990 | 770 | +2.72% |
| 1999 | 863 | +1.27% |
| 2006 | 1,002 | +2.16% |
| 2022 | 1,300 | +1.64% |

Source: EHESS and INSEE

== See also ==
- Communes of the Isère department
