= Charavines =

- Commune
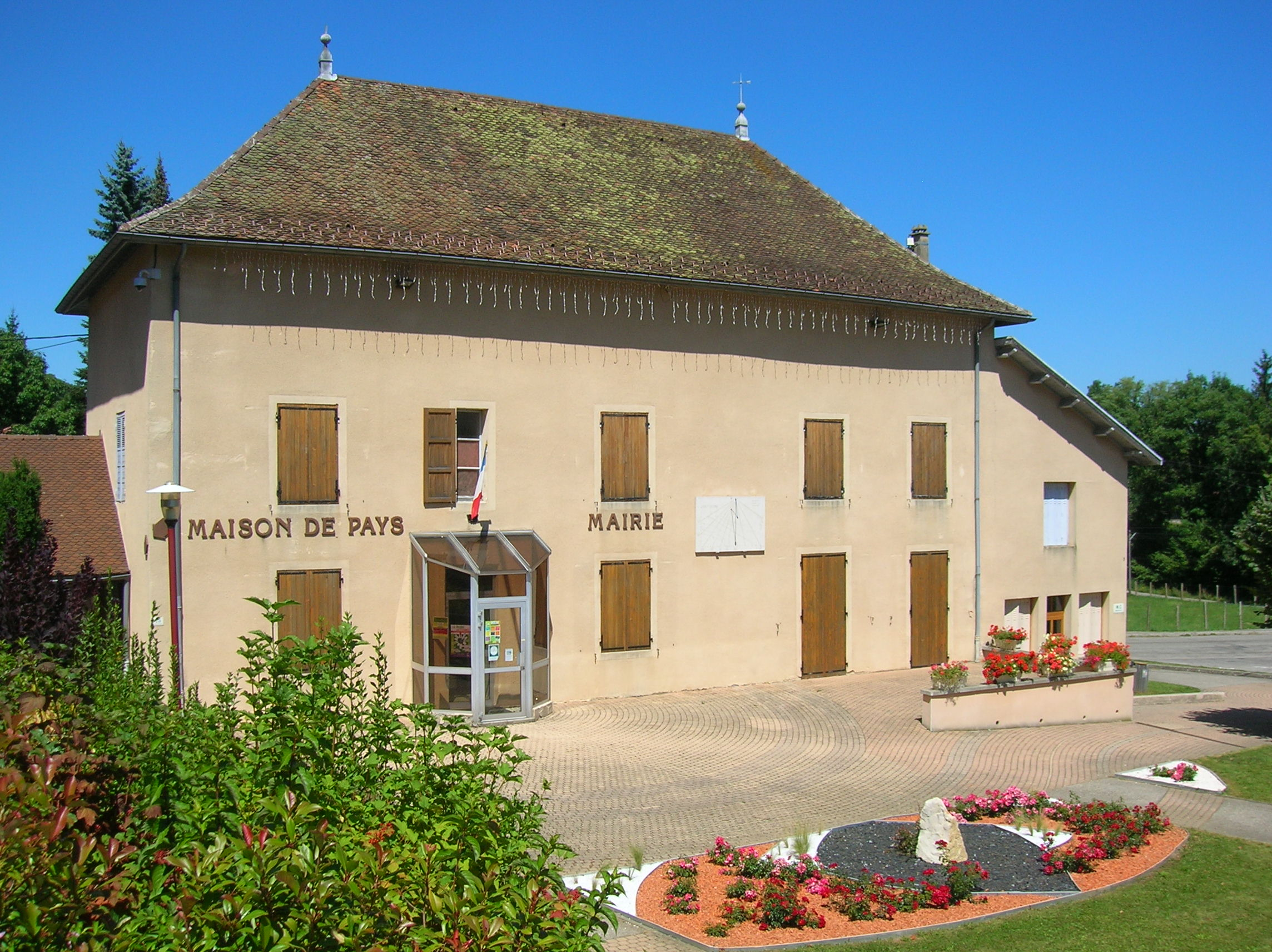
- The town hall of Charavines
- Location of Charavines
- Location within France Location within Auvergne-Rhône-Alpes
- Coordinates: 45°25′54″N 5°30′51″E
- Country: France
- Region: Auvergne-Rhône-Alpes
- Department: Isère
- Arrondissement: La Tour-du-Pin
- Canton: Le Grand-Lemps
- Intercommunality: CA Pays Voironnais

Government
  - Mayor (2020–2026): Bruno Guillaud-Bataille
- Area^{1}: 7.52 km^{2} (2.90 sq mi)
- Elevation: 516 m (1,693 ft)
- Highest elevation: 800 m (2,600 ft)
- Lowest elevation: 440 m (1,440 ft)
- Population (2023): 2,003
  - Density: 266/km^{2} (690/sq mi)
- Time zone: UTC+01:00 (CET)
  - Summer (DST): UTC+02:00 (CEST)
- INSEE/Postal code: 38082 /38850
- ^{1} French Land Register data, which excludes lakes, ponds, glaciers > 1 km^{2} (0.386 sq mi or 247 acres) and river estuaries.

Charavines (French pronunciation: [ʃaʁavin]) is a commune in the Isère department in southeastern France.

== Population ==
Historical population
Year	Pop.	±% p.a.
1968	1,250	—
1975	1,142	−1.28%
1982	1,163	+0.26%
1990	1,251	+0.92%
1999	1,423	+1.44%
2007	1,701	+2.26%
2012	1,823	+1.39%
2017	1,925	+1.09%
2023	2,003	+0.66%
Source: INSEE

== See also ==
- Communes of the Isère department
