= Montferrat, Isère =

Montferrat
- Commune
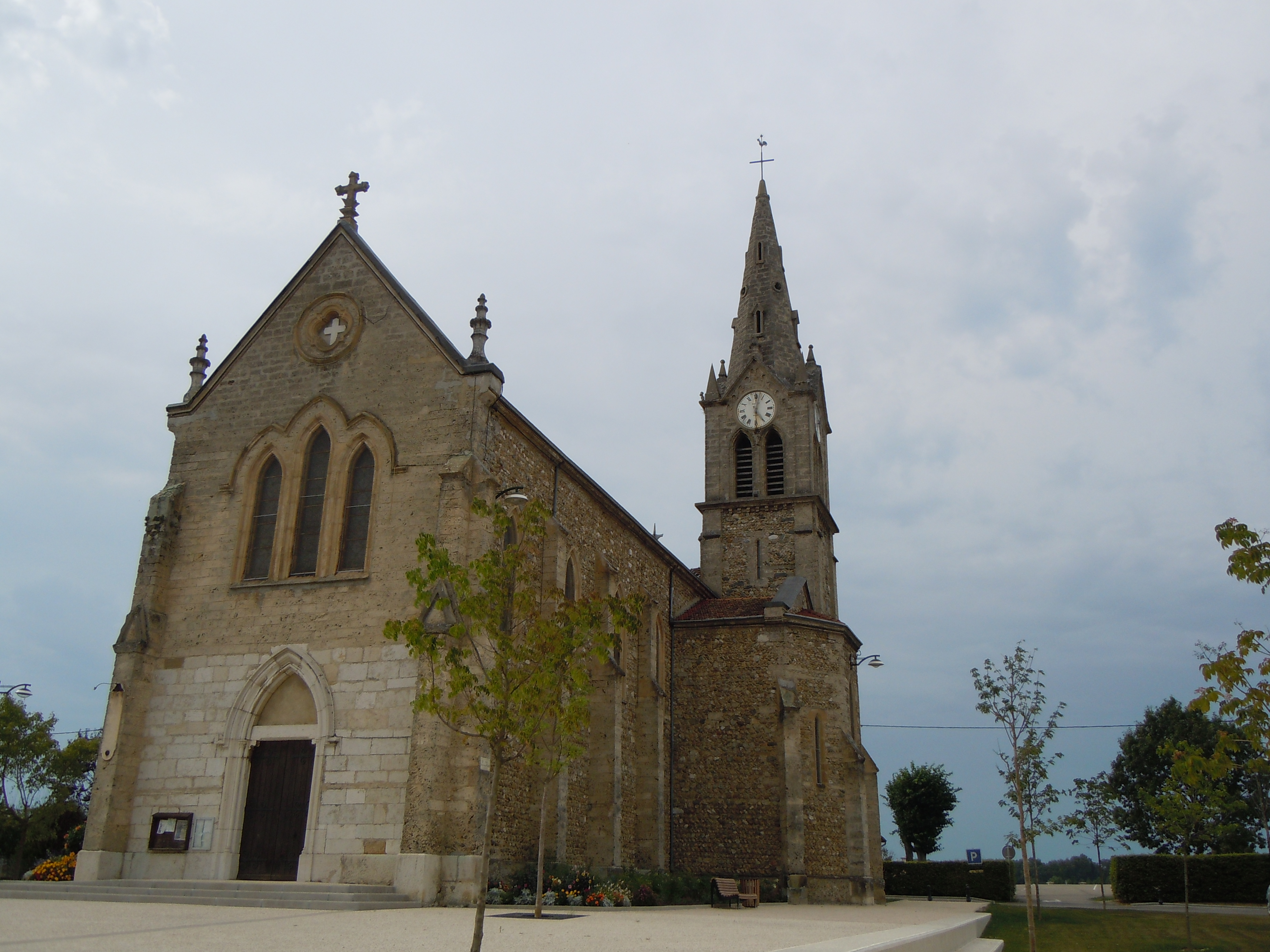
- The church of Montferrat
- Location of Montferrat
- Location within France Location within Auvergne-Rhône-Alpes
- Coordinates: 45°29′19″N 5°35′29″E
- Country: France
- Region: Auvergne-Rhône-Alpes
- Department: Isère
- Arrondissement: La Tour-du-Pin
- Canton: Le Grand-Lemps
- Intercommunality: CA Pays Voironnais

Government
  - Mayor (2020–2026): Roland Perrin-Cocon
- Area^{1}: 12.26 km^{2} (4.73 sq mi)
- Elevation: 557 m (1,827 ft)
- Highest elevation: 721 m (2,365 ft)
- Lowest elevation: 488 m (1,601 ft)
- Population (2023): 1,846
  - Density: 150.6/km^{2} (390.0/sq mi)
- Time zone: UTC+01:00 (CET)
  - Summer (DST): UTC+02:00 (CEST)
- INSEE/Postal code: 38256 /38620
- ^{1} French Land Register data, which excludes lakes, ponds, glaciers > 1 km^{2} (0.386 sq mi or 247 acres) and river estuaries.

Montferrat (French pronunciation: [mɔ̃fɛʁa]) is a commune in the Isère department in southeastern France.

== Population ==
Historical population
Year	Pop.	±% p.a.
1968	669	—
1975	680	+0.23%
1982	981	+5.37%
1990	1,249	+3.07%
1999	1,286	+0.32%
2007	1,472	+1.70%
2012	1,646	+2.26%
2017	1,786	+1.65%
2023	1,846	+0.55%
Source: INSEE

== See also ==
- Communes of the Isère department
- Lac de Paladru
