= Grande Sure =

Touristic mountain in France

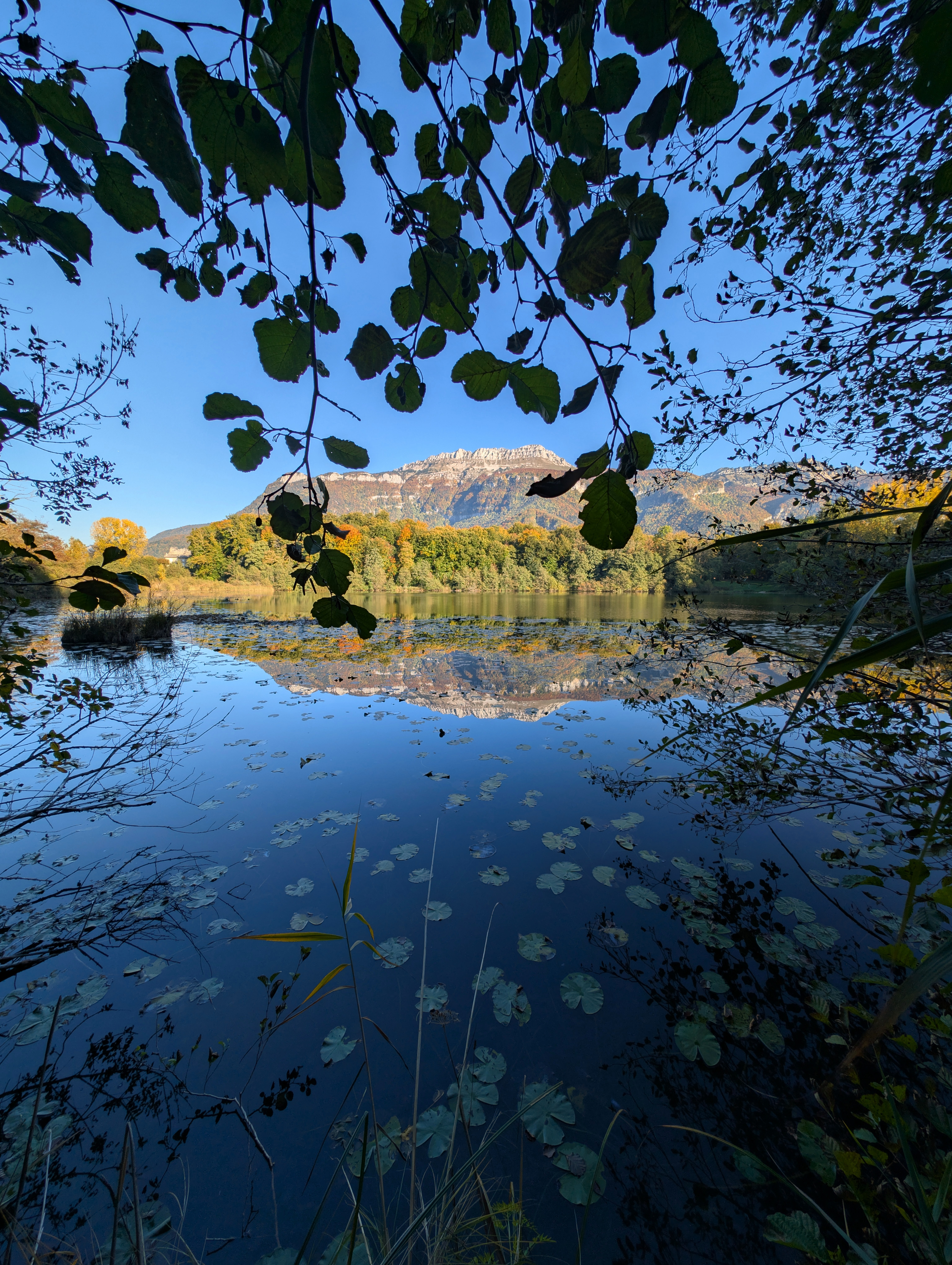
- West view of La Grande Sure, from Saint-Julien-de-Ratz

Highest point
- Elevation: 6,299 ft (1,920 m)
- Coordinates: 45°20′07″N 05°42′11″E

Geography
- Grande Sure (France)
- Country: France
- Region: Auvergne-Rhône-Alpes
- Department: Isère
- Parent range: The Chartreuse Mountain Chain (Alpes)

Geology
- Mountain type: Hogback
- Rock type: Limestone

Climbing
- Easiest route: From the Charmette mountain pass.

The Grande Sure (French pronunciation: [ɡʁɑ̃d syʁ]; Occitan: Gran Segur) is a mountain in the French department of Isère, rising to an altitude of 1,920 meters in the Chartreuse mountain chain, in the Alps, overlooking the Pays Voironnais. Located on the western border of the mountain chain, it is composed of Fontanil limestone. It can be climbed from the eastern side via the Charmette mountain pass via the Grande Vache mountain pass, or from the Placette mountain pass via the western side, which is more strenuous and has a higher difficulty. This mountain is part of the Chartreuse Regional Nature Park as well as a natural zone of ecological, faunistic and floristic interest. The species of the chamois (Rupicapra rupicapra) is particularly present in steep parts of the alpine tundra.

== Toponymy ==
Sure, like Suretta, means "mountain, heap, pile". This word roots from the umbrian surum. The origin would be common with thur and thura, in which the th, far from being an occlusive consonant, is a fricative one, along with turraz, tuglia and tauern. In the case of the latter, as in High Tauern or Lower Tauern, taur would mean "mountain", but also "mountain pass" and would have originated from Slavic languages, where tur signifies a height, a hill. If the Grande and Petite Vache's mountain passes or even if the Valley des Veaux, could indicate a long-established presence of mountain livestock breeding, the explanation according to which Sure derives from the chtiure or stiure, regionalism for "goat" would appear very unlikely.

The Grande Vache pastures and the Petite Vache valley are shown on the Cassini map, but it wasn't until the 18th-century État-Major maps that the Rochers de la Sure were mentioned, with an altitude of 1,924 meters. The Brittany-born Antonin Macé, who had become a professor of history at Grenoble University, published a series of articles, particularly in the Bulletin officiel des chemins de fer, mentioning La Grande Sure in 1860.

== Geography ==
=== Location ===
La Grande Sure is located in south-eastern France, in the Auvergne-Rhône-Alpes region and the Isère department, within the commune of Saint-Julien-de-Ratz. The northern end of the mountain belongs to the commune of Saint-Joseph-de-Rivière, while the southern end is part of the territory of Pommiers-la-Placette. It is situated around ten kilometers east-southeast of Voiron, around 17 kilometers north of Grenoble and over 80 kilometers southeast of Lyon. It is part of the French Prealps Chartreuse mountain chain.

It extends to the south, through the western crest of the mountain chain, passing by the Rocher de Lorzier (1,838 mts) and the Rochers de Chalves (1,845 mts); beyond the Crête d'Hurtières, to the east, rises the Charmant Som (1,867 mts). To the west, La Grande Sure dominates Jura's plateau du Grand-Ratz (942 mts at its highest point).

Topographic Map of La Grande Sure.

=== Topography ===
The mountain rises to an altitude of 1,920 meters. At its base, to the north, lies the Plaine du Guiers (approx. 400 mts), to the west, the Placette mountain pass (587 mts) which it towers over with a fall of almost 1,500 meters; and to the southeast, the Charmette mountain pass (1,261 mts). To the east are the Sure (1,675 mts) and Grande Vache (1,712 mts) mountain passes, and to the northeast, the Petite Vache (1,643 mts) and Charmille (1,605 mts) mountain passes.

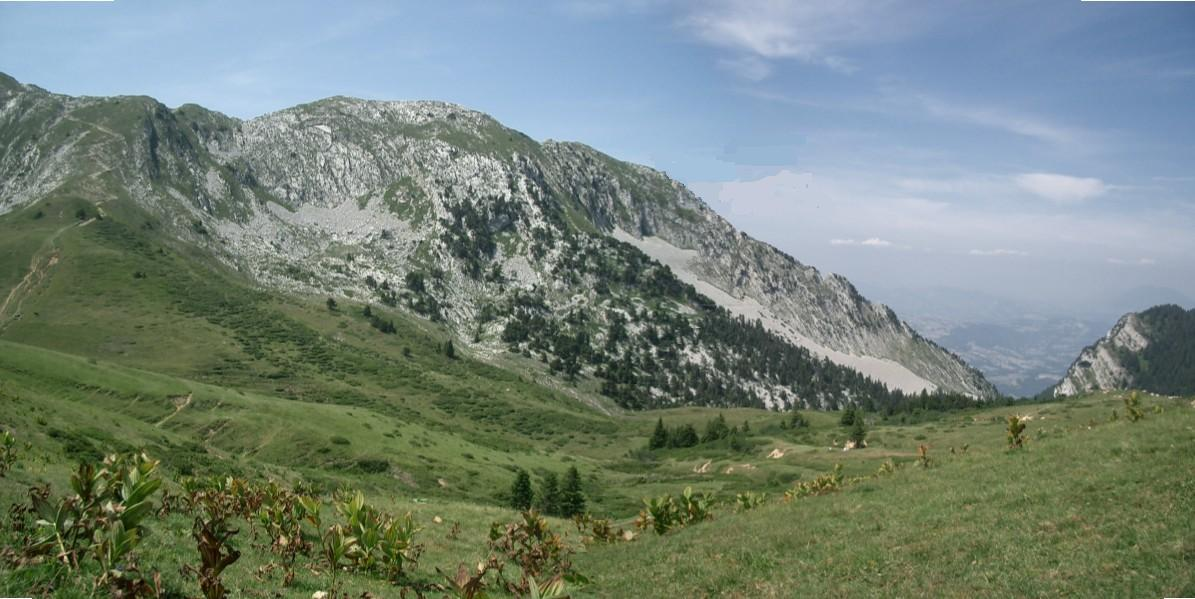
Northwards view from La Grande Sure mountain pass.

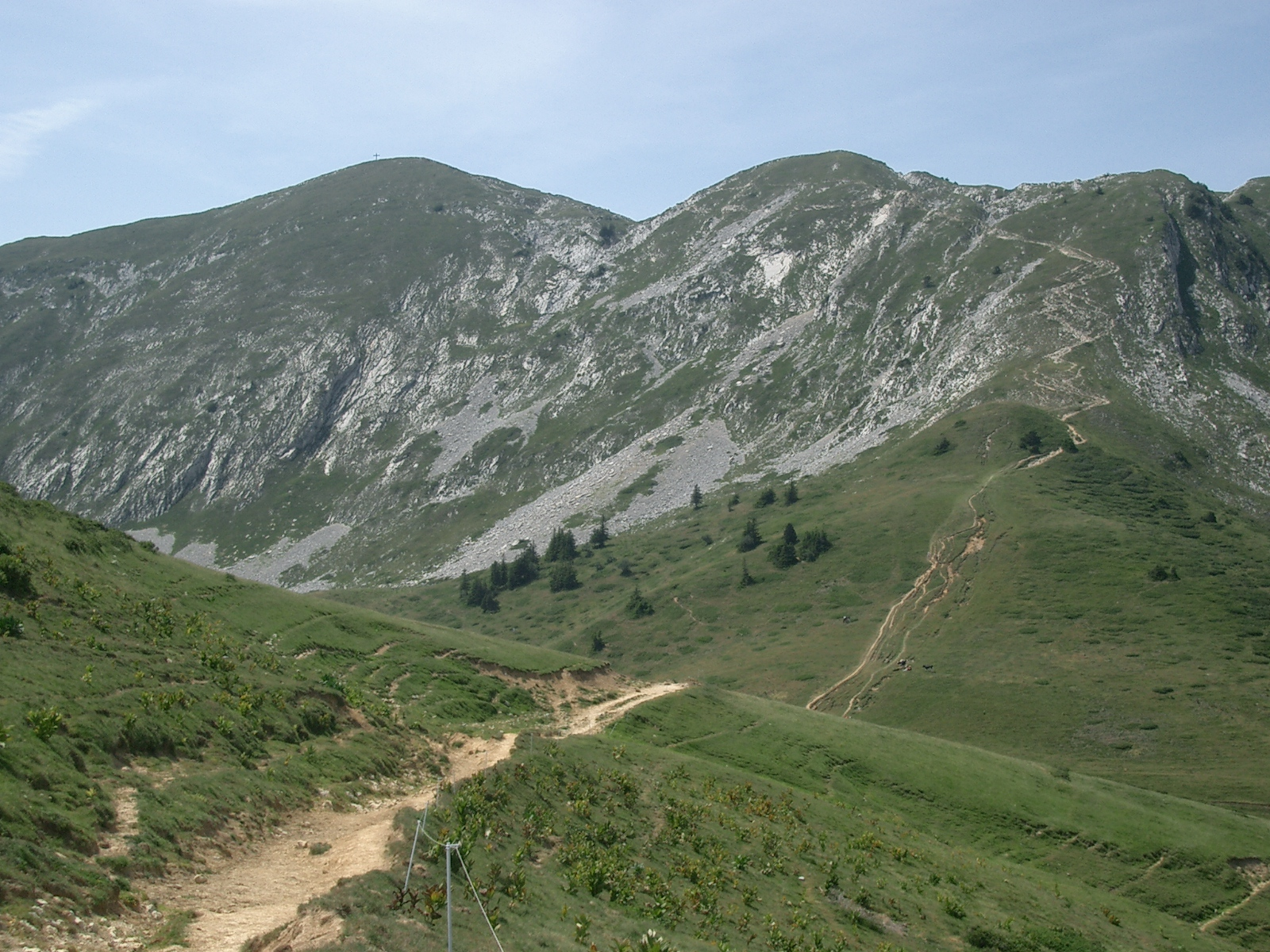
View of the mountain from La Grande Sure mountain pass.

In the Pays Voironnais region, from where it is particularly visible, La Grande Sure is shaped like a molar, leaning slightly to the east due to the inflection at the ends of its summit crest. Looking eastwards, its appearance is sharper. Its walls dominate high meadows covered by scree situated above the timberline between 1,500 and 1,600 meters of altitude. Several torrents flow down the mountain's western hillside: the stream of Chorolant to the north, the stream of Grand Moulin from which the Pisserotte waterfall springs, the Petit Ruisseau also known as the stream of Bouzes, and, to the south, the stream of Grépy also known as the stream of l'Hérétang.

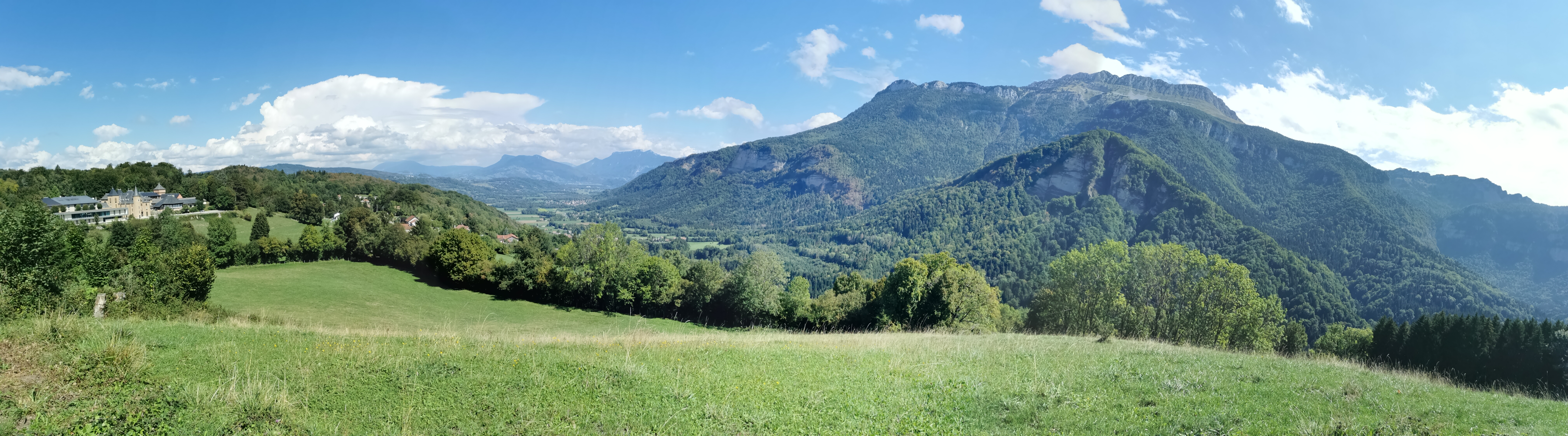
View of La Grande Sure from plateau du Grand-Ratz.

=== Geology ===
La Grande Sure is composed of Fontanil limestone corresponding to the Valanginian stage, formed by marine sedimentation in the Alpine Tethys during the Early Cretaceous. The upper Hauterivian stage forms the western talus of the Hurtières crest, to the east. The Urgonian Limestone, characteristic of the other main summits of the Chartreuse, is present here only on the eastern side of the Hurtières crest. In the opposite direction from the summit, the western side of La Grande Sure is composed of Berriasian limestone and limestone-marl alternations. To the west, it is dominated by Late Jurassic Tithonian limestone and Miocene molasse sandstone.

La Grande Sure is formed by the western side of the vast Proveysieux syncline, centered on the Charmette mountain pass. The rocky promontories to the west of the summit, at the level of Pierre Taillée and Les Trois Fontaines, form an anticline that straddles the Voreppe syncline. The discovery of rocks lower than the Urgonian period in La Grande Sure's region can be explained by one or two phases of peneplanation, with the most recent dating back to the Villafranchian period (late Pliocene-early Pleistocene), while Alpine orogeny was still in progress. Traces of this flattening are clearly visible at the summit of La Grande Sure and along the eastern side of the Hurtières crest. Late tectonic folding of the Voreppe overlap, followed by differential erosion in the Quaternary period, completed the exposure of the older rocks. The valleys to the north and south of the Sure mountain pass reveal the presence of ancient glaciers on the eastern side of the mountain.

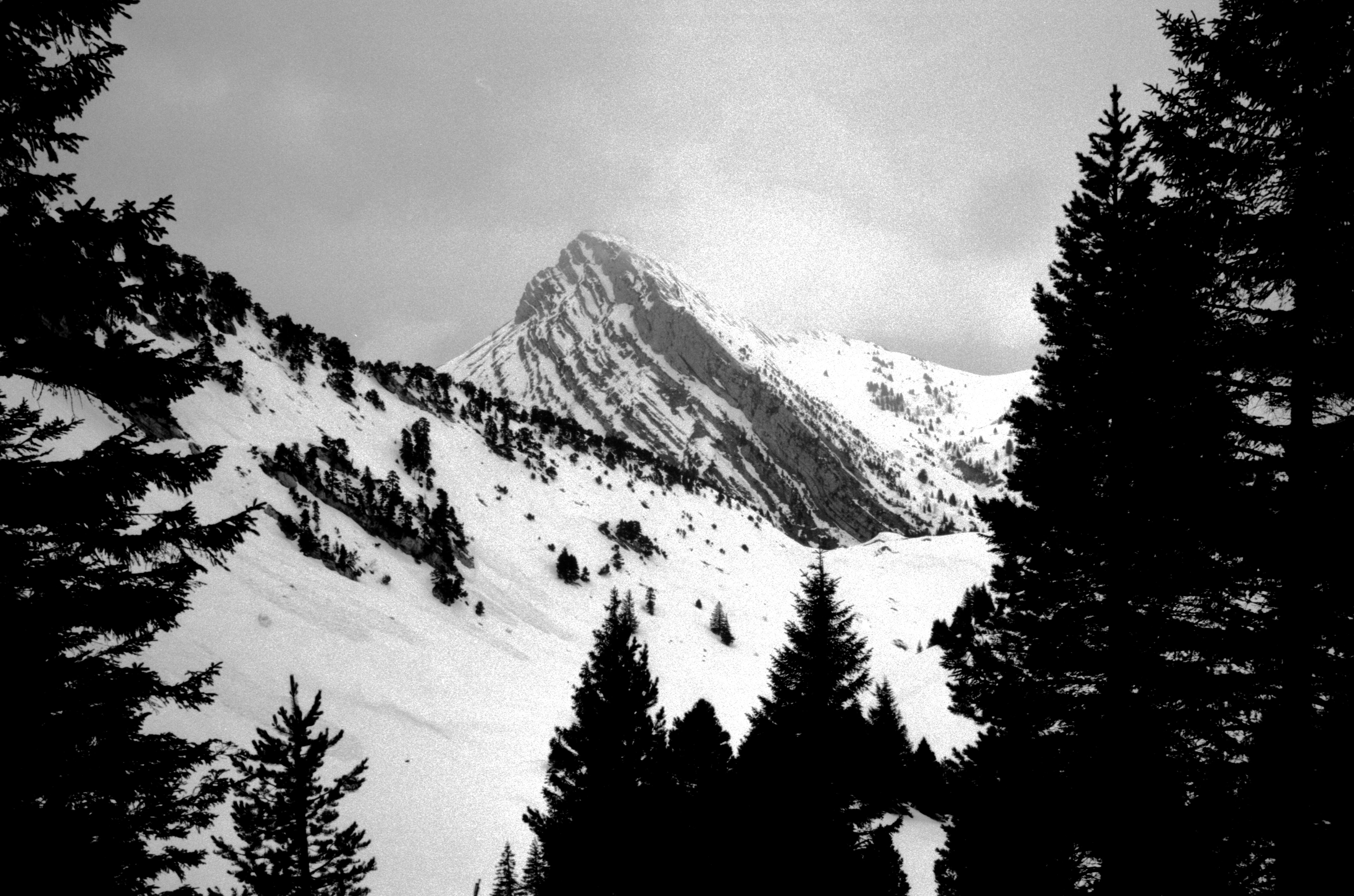
View of La Grande Sure on winter, under the snow.

=== Weather ===
The Chartreuse mountain chain is characterized by an oceanic-alpine climate. It acts as a barrier to the strong westerly winds from the Atlantic Ocean, and thus receives a large amount of precipitation, with a peak in early spring and another in early autumn. A third of this precipitation comes in the form of snow. As a result, the snowpack depth at the Porte mountain pass (1,326 m) is around one meter at the end of February but has reached record levels of 200 to 230 centimeters during the same period in 1979, 1982, and 1985. However, average snow cover, which has decreased by half over the last fifty years, has reached an average of fifty centimeters over the last ten years. As a result, since the 2000s, there has been an average of 150 days of snow per year on the Porte mountain pass, that is, thirty days less than in the 1960s; the presence of a snowpack depth above one meter has decreased to an average of fifteen days every ten years over the same period. This finding corresponds to a temperature rise of 1.4 °C (34.52 °F) over the past half-century, from December 1 to April 30.

=== Flora and Fauna ===
La Grande Sure is a sanctuary for chamois. The Corsican Mouflon was introduced in 1970 and has a population of around 100 individuals, moving from Charmant Som in summer to the outskirts of La Grande Sure in winter. Among the identified bird species are the Golden eagle and the Black grouse, protected under the Birds Directive, as well as the Alpine chough and the Eurasian woodcock.

The Lady's Slipper Orchid is protected under the Habitats Directive. Like this species, the Bear's Ear Primrose and the Variable Saxifrage are protected throughout the French metropolitan area. Other species include Montpellier Fringed Pink, the St John's Wort (also called Vulnéraire du Dauphiné), the Pink Cinquefoil, the Daphne alpina, the Epipactis leptochila Orchid, the Perennial Honesty, the Sermontain broomrape (Orobanche laserpitii-sileris) and a species of fern called the Hard Shield-fern.

== History ==
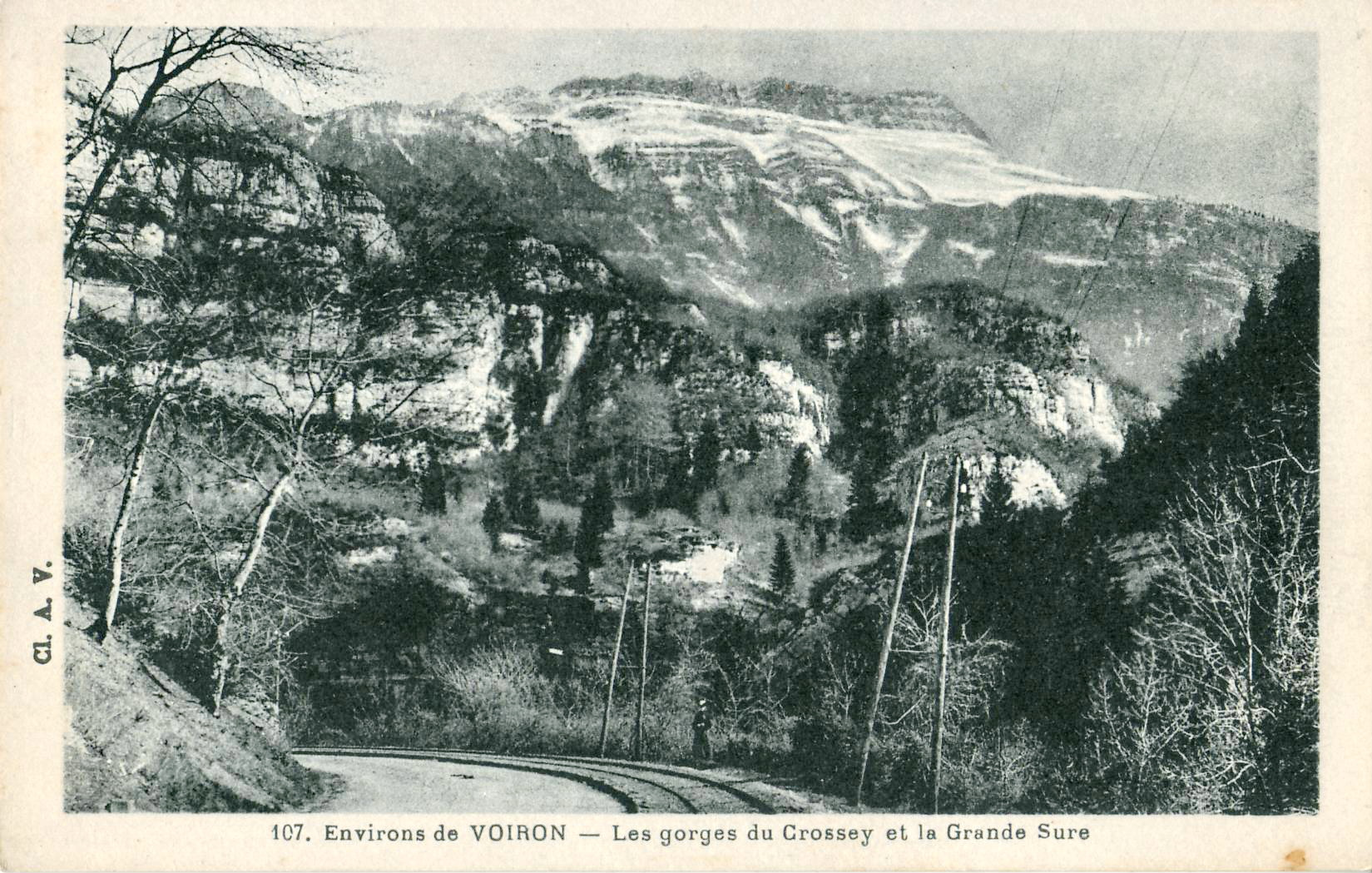
Postcard circa 1935 depicting the Crossey defile and La Grande Sure.

In the mid-19th century, there were reports of chalets, which have since been removed, at the Grande and the Petite Vache. La Grande Sure's pastures were also used for other purposes. In 1882, Émile Viallet wrote an article about this mountain in Le Dauphiné, which was subsequently published in a sixteen-page work entitled Ascension de la Grande Sure (massif de la Chartreuse) par Voreppe, Pommiers et le Pas de la Miséricorde, avec indications de divers itinéraires.

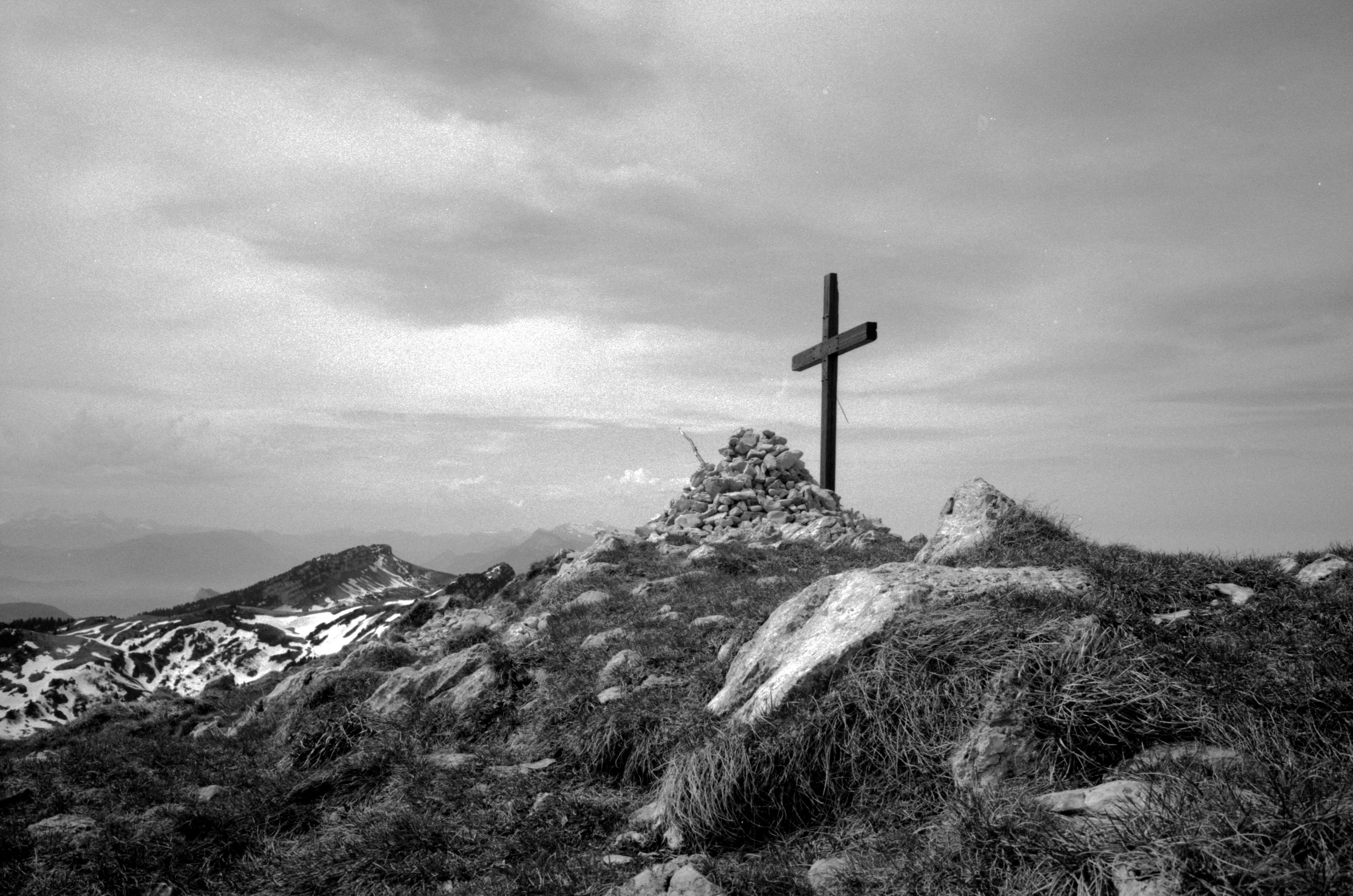
View of the summit cross and a cairn at La Grande Sure.

In April 2000, the summit cross of La Grande Sure was the first of many to be vandalized in the Chartreuse mountain chain. The following year, two new crosses were prepared for its summit. On June 10, 2001, a larger cross, made out of glued laminated timber, was installed to be visible from the Voironnais area. It was knocked down again ten days later when a cloud covered the summit. On July 21, it was uprighted but had lost 1.3 meters in height. The second, more elaborate cross was eventually placed on Chamechaude, which had lost its own several years earlier.

== Activities ==
=== Hiking ===
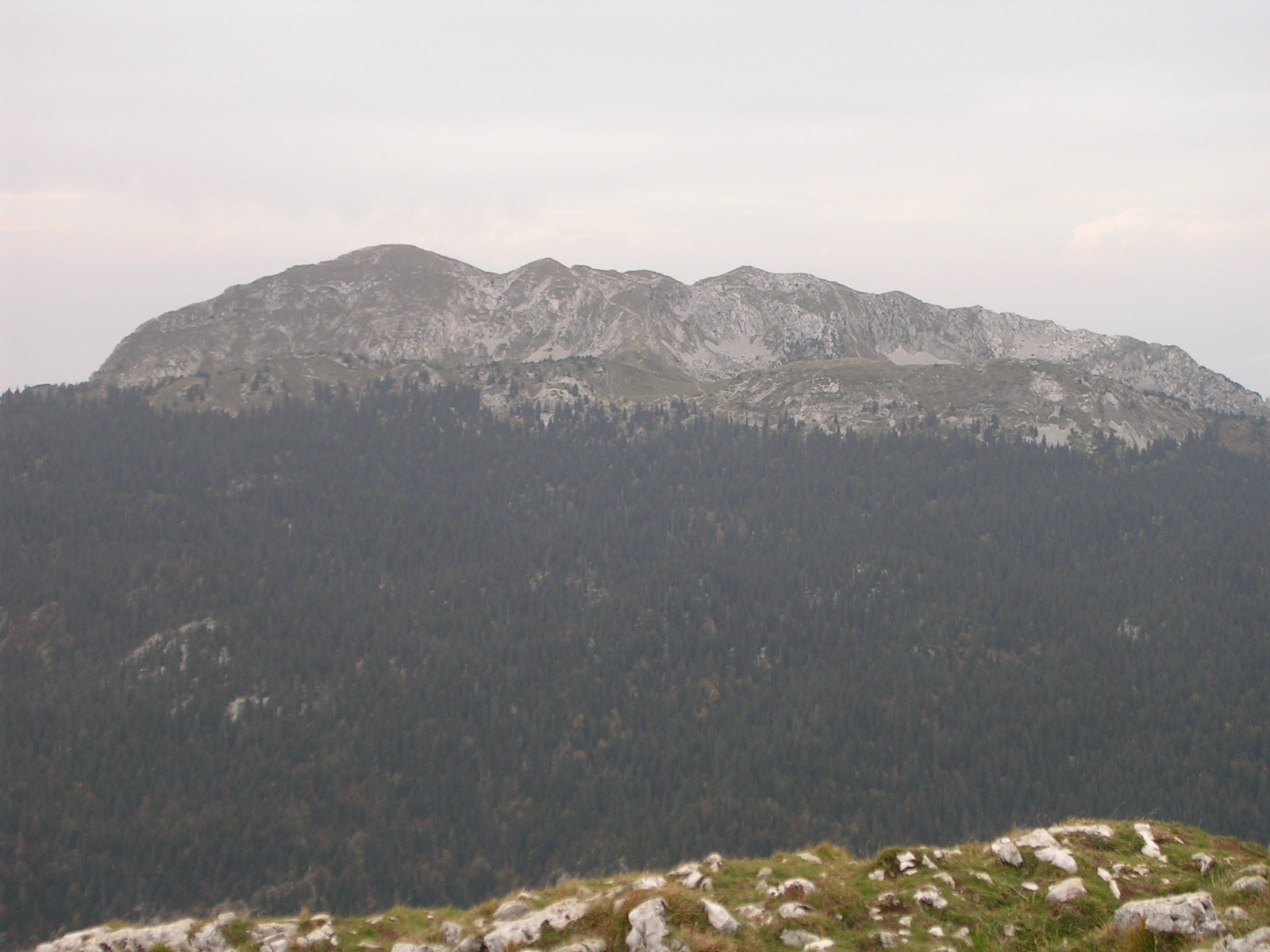
View of the western side of La Grande Sure from Charmant Som’s summit.

The classic hiking route starts at the Charmette mountain pass, accessible via Route Départementale 105 from Saint-Égrève and passing through Proveysieux. After the Chalet de la Charmette, 200 mts north of the pass, the forest road gradually turns into a simple pathway heading northwest. This lead, after about an hour and a half's walk, to the Grande Vache mountain pass. Following a short descent to the Sure mountain pass, the pathway climbs up along the eastern side of La Grande Sure until it reaches the summit, to the southwest, after an additional thirty minutes’ walk. This 660-meter-high hike is easy and suitable for everyone. You can return via the Hurtières Gut, south of the Grande Vache mountain pass.

The ascent can also be made from the west, from Les Trois Fontaines, on the eastern side of the Placette mountain pass, with an altitude of 1,350 meters. After a series of zigzags leading northwards, the pathway curves eastwards, passing a natural belvedere after around 45 minutes, and then the Pas de la Miséricorde, featuring a relatively long passageway, equipped with cables, which is exposed to both drops and rockfalls. Shortly afterwards, it is possible to head south through a natural cirque on the Charminelle pathway, which is marked in yellow for hikers according to the Charte Officielle du Balisage et de la Signalisation. It takes an additional hour to reach the meadow of the same name. From here, head east on a pathway that becomes relatively steep, even requiring you to use your hands to get stability through the cheminée de Lorzier. After 45 minutes, we reach the upper part of the Hurtières mountain pass. Head northwards through the alpine pastures, passing close to the Hurtières refuge, to reach the Sure mountain pass, in about an hour. The final ascent towards the summit is via the classic route. The refuge, at an altitude of 1,546 meters, is an annex of the sheep barn. While the building is in good condition, the interior offers a more basic level of comfort, with six beds. From the Pas de la Miséricorde, it is also possible to continue eastwards with a steady climb along the Hérétang stream up to Velouse, then either back up to the Sure mountain pass or up the southern ridge. An alternative route, shortly after the Pas de la Miséricorde, is to turn left at the Rocher du Coq along the Combe des Veaux, using your hands at times to climb up to the Chalet de Jusson. At 1,553 meters of altitude, this chalet has eight beds with mattresses. From here, it's up a steep meadow with the summit cross as a landmark. The final section is a passageway, which is signposted by a stele in the shape of a small metal cross and orange-yellow markers for hikers. The ascent up to the summit requires a few easy climbing moves. This variation takes around three hours to complete.

=== Climbing ===
A new climbing route called Une sauterelle à la Sure, with a height of 130 meters, has been opened in the pillar to the south of the summit. The access route is from the Chalet de Jusson. The bottom of the route is graded 5b, but the first ten meters can be avoided by climbing to the left and heading straight for the 4c graded passages. The top of the route alternates between 3b grade and 4a grade. This is a variation opened by Mathieu Michel on September 3, 2006, from a route of unknown origin.

=== Speleology ===
A number of pit caves have been discovered in the Valanginian limestones; the two most significant are the Loup Garou pit, (Note: The Loup Garou pit cave has the following coordinates: 45° 20′ 33″ N, 5° 42′ 48″ E.) which reaches a depth of 556 meters, and the Jacques Chalon cave system, (Note: The Jacques Chalon cave system has the following coordinates: 45° 20′ 32″ N, 5° 42′ 53″ E.) which extends over three kilometers and reaches a depth of 314 meters.

=== Environmental protection ===
La Grande Sure is located within the Chartreuse Regional Nature Park, which was created in 1995 and, since the revision of its charter in 2008, covers 767 km^{2}. The summit is also classified as a "Type I" natural zone of ecological, faunistic and floristic interest (ZNIEFF), which extends northwards across 1,555 hectares over the Rocher de la Petite Vache as well as the Rocher des Agneaux, and southwards to the Rocher de Chalves, including the Rocher de Lorzier.

== In popular culture ==
La Grande Sure was one of the favorite landscapes of the painter Lucien Mainssieux, who was born and died in Voiron (1885–1958).

== See also ==
- Isère's Geography
- Chartreuse Mountains
- Alps
- Cézallier Massif – Volcanic plateau from France
