= Coleophora nutantella =

Scientific classification
- Kingdom: Animalia
- Phylum: Arthropoda
- Class: Insecta
- Order: Lepidoptera
- Family: Coleophoridae
- Genus: Coleophora
- Species: C. nutantella

Binomial name
- Coleophora nutantella Muhlig & Frey, 1857

Synonyms
- List: Coleophora inflatae Stainton, 1857; Coleophora inflatella Doubleday, 1859 (Unjustified emendation of Coleophora inflatae Stainton, 1857); Coleophora amphibiella Guenée, 1877; Coleophora graminicolella Lhomme, 1951 (nec Heinemann, 1876)

Species of moth

Coleophora nutantella is a moth of the family Coleophoridae. It is found from Fennoscandia to Spain, Sicily and Greece and from France to the Baltic states, Poland, Slovakia, Hungary and Romania. It is also found in Asia Minor.

The wingspan is 14–18 mm. Adults are on wing from May to July.

The larvae feed on Silene nutans, Silene otites and Oberna behen. They feed on the generative organs of their host plant.
