= Coleophora musculella =

Scientific classification
- Kingdom: Animalia
- Phylum: Arthropoda
- Class: Insecta
- Order: Lepidoptera
- Family: Coleophoridae
- Genus: Coleophora
- Species: C. musculella

Binomial name
- Coleophora musculella Muhlig, 1864

Species of moth

Coleophora musculella is a moth of the family Coleophoridae. It is found from Poland to the Pyrenees and from France to Hungary.

The larvae feed on Dianthus carthusianorum and Dianthus superbus. Larvae can be found from September to May.
