= La Sure en Chartreuse =

- Commune
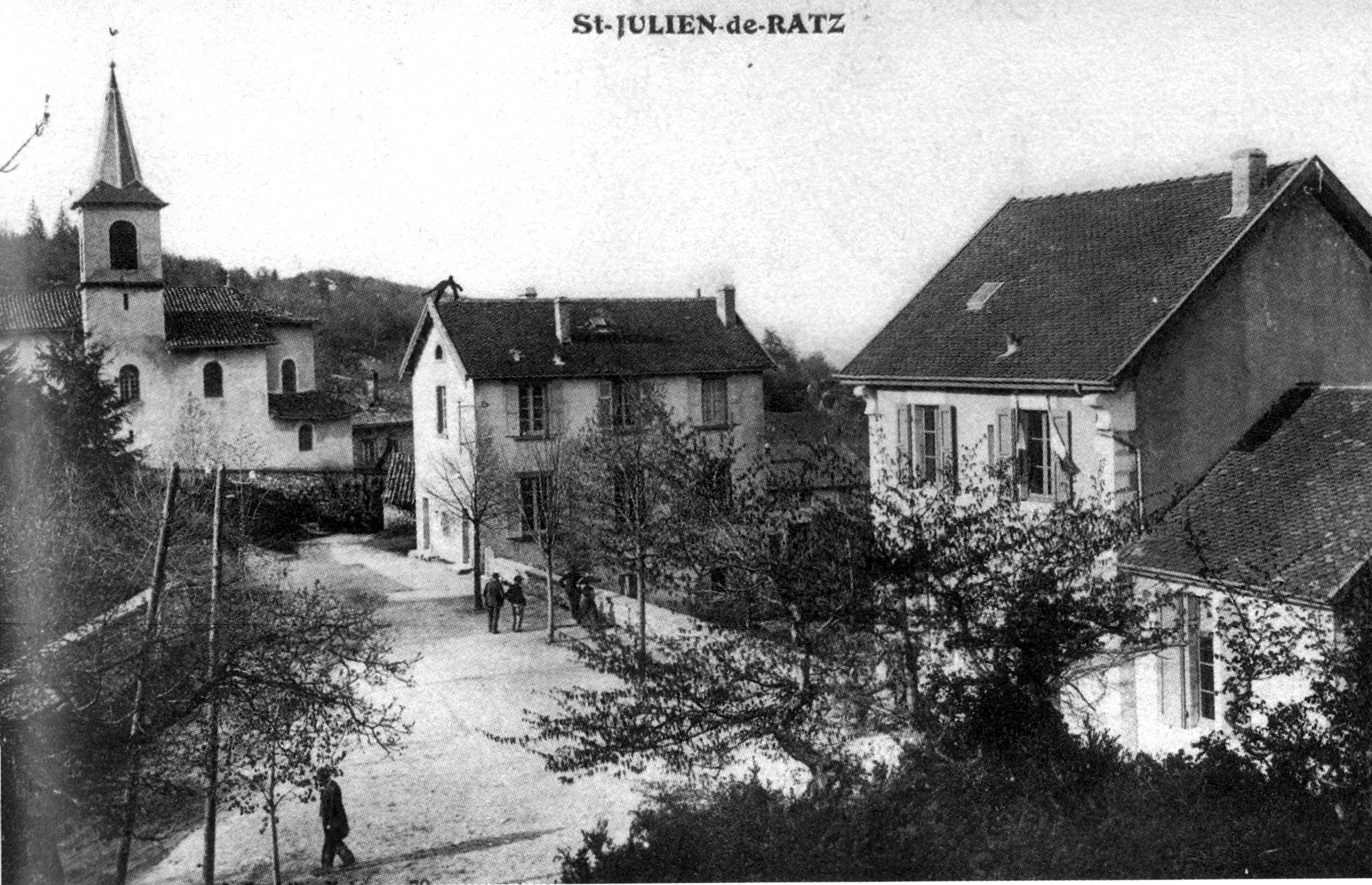
- Saint-Julien-de-Raz in 1906
- Location of La Sure en Chartreuse
- Location within France Location within Auvergne-Rhône-Alpes
- Coordinates: 45°21′04″N 5°39′47″E
- Country: France
- Region: Auvergne-Rhône-Alpes
- Department: Isère
- Arrondissement: Grenoble
- Canton: Voiron
- Intercommunality: CA Pays Voironnais

Government
  - Mayor (2020–2026): Virginie Rivière
- Area^{1}: 27.73 km^{2} (10.71 sq mi)
- Population (2023): 1,072
  - Density: 38.66/km^{2} (100.1/sq mi)
- Time zone: UTC+01:00 (CET)
  - Summer (DST): UTC+02:00 (CEST)
- INSEE/Postal code: 38407 /38134
- ^{1} French Land Register data, which excludes lakes, ponds, glaciers > 1 km^{2} (0.386 sq mi or 247 acres) and river estuaries.

La Sure en Chartreuse (French pronunciation: [la syʁ ɑ̃ ʃaʁtʁøz], lit. 'The Sure in Chartreuse') is a commune in the department of Isère, southeastern France. The municipality was established on 1 January 2017 by merger of the former communes of Saint-Julien-de-Raz (the seat) and Pommiers-la-Placette.

== See also ==
- Communes of the Isère department
