= Lac Arrédoun =

Lake in Hautes-Pyrénées, France

Lac d'Arredoun
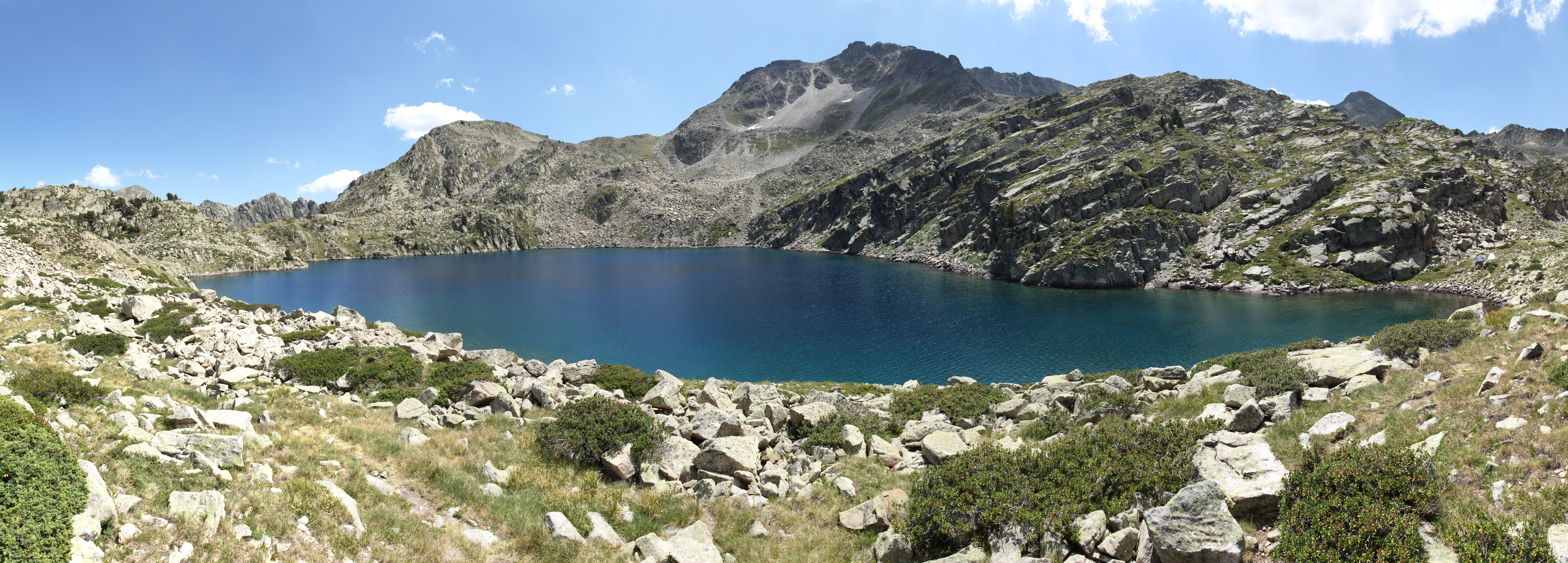

- Location within France
- Location: Hautes-Pyrénées
- Coordinates: 42°52′32″N 0°12′38″E
- Basin countries: France
- Surface area: 0.3 km^{2} (0.12 sq mi)
- Max. depth: 21 m (69 ft)
- Surface elevation: 2,326 m (7,631 ft)

Lac d'Arredoun is a lake in Hautes-Pyrénées, France. At an elevation of 2,326 m (7,631 ft), its surface area is 0.3 km^{2} (0.12 sq mi), and its depth is 21 m.

It is mostly accessible via the French hiking footpath GR 10 going through the Pyrenees mountain range, whose route goes through southwestern France.

The lake is classified as a ZNIEFF and is also part of the Adour basin, which stems from the river Adour.
