= Coleophora tanaceti =

Scientific classification
- Kingdom: Animalia
- Phylum: Arthropoda
- Class: Insecta
- Order: Lepidoptera
- Family: Coleophoridae
- Genus: Coleophora
- Species: C. tanaceti

Binomial name
- Coleophora tanaceti Mühlig, 1865

Synonyms
- Coleophora pallida Toll, 1942

Species of moth

Coleophora tanaceti is a moth of the family Coleophoridae. It is found from Spain, north to Fennoscandia, east to the Baltic region, south to Italy and Bulgaria. It has also been recorded from the Near East.

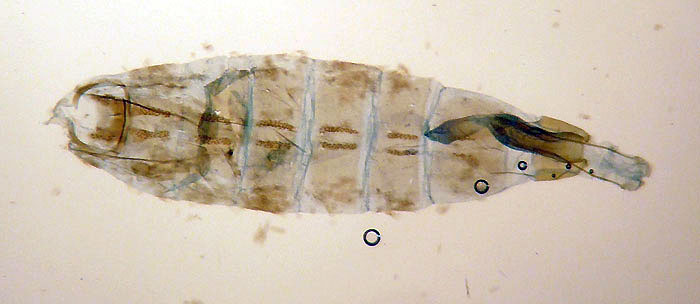
