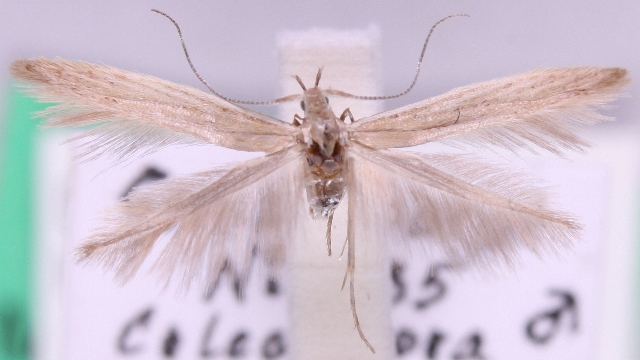

Scientific classification
- Kingdom: Animalia
- Phylum: Arthropoda
- Class: Insecta
- Order: Lepidoptera
- Family: Coleophoridae
- Genus: Coleophora
- Species: C. asteris

Binomial name
- Coleophora asteris Muhlig, 1864

Synonyms
- Coleophora tripoliella Hodgkinson, 1875

= Coleophora asteris =

Species of moth

Coleophora asteris is a moth of the family Coleophoridae found in North Africa and Europe.

== Description ==
The wingspan is 10–15 mm.

== Subspecies ==
- Coleophora asteris asteris
- Coleophora asteris abbreviata Falkovitsh, 1993 (eastern Siberia)

== Distribution ==
Coleophora asteris has been found from Ireland to Germany, Austria and Romania and from Norway and Sweden to France, Italy and Hungary. It has also been recorded from Crete and North Africa.
