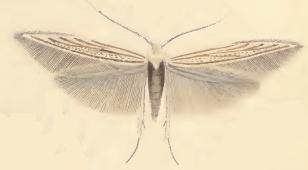

Scientific classification
- Kingdom: Animalia
- Phylum: Arthropoda
- Class: Insecta
- Order: Lepidoptera
- Family: Coleophoridae
- Genus: Coleophora
- Species: C. odorariella

Binomial name
- Coleophora odorariella Muhlig, 1857

Synonyms
- Coleophora chrysocomae Hering, 1942

= Coleophora odorariella =

Species of moth

Coleophora odorariella is a moth of the family Coleophoridae. It is found from Germany to Romania. It has also been recorded from Spain and North Macedonia.

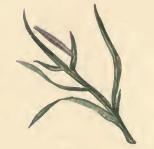
Mined leaf of Serratula cyanoides with attached larval case

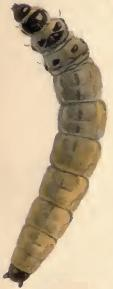
Larva

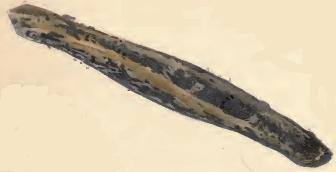
Larval case

The larvae feed on Jurinea humilis, Jurinea mollis and Serratula species. Full-grown larvae can be found in July.
