= Pommiers-la-Placette =

- Part of La Sure en Chartreuse
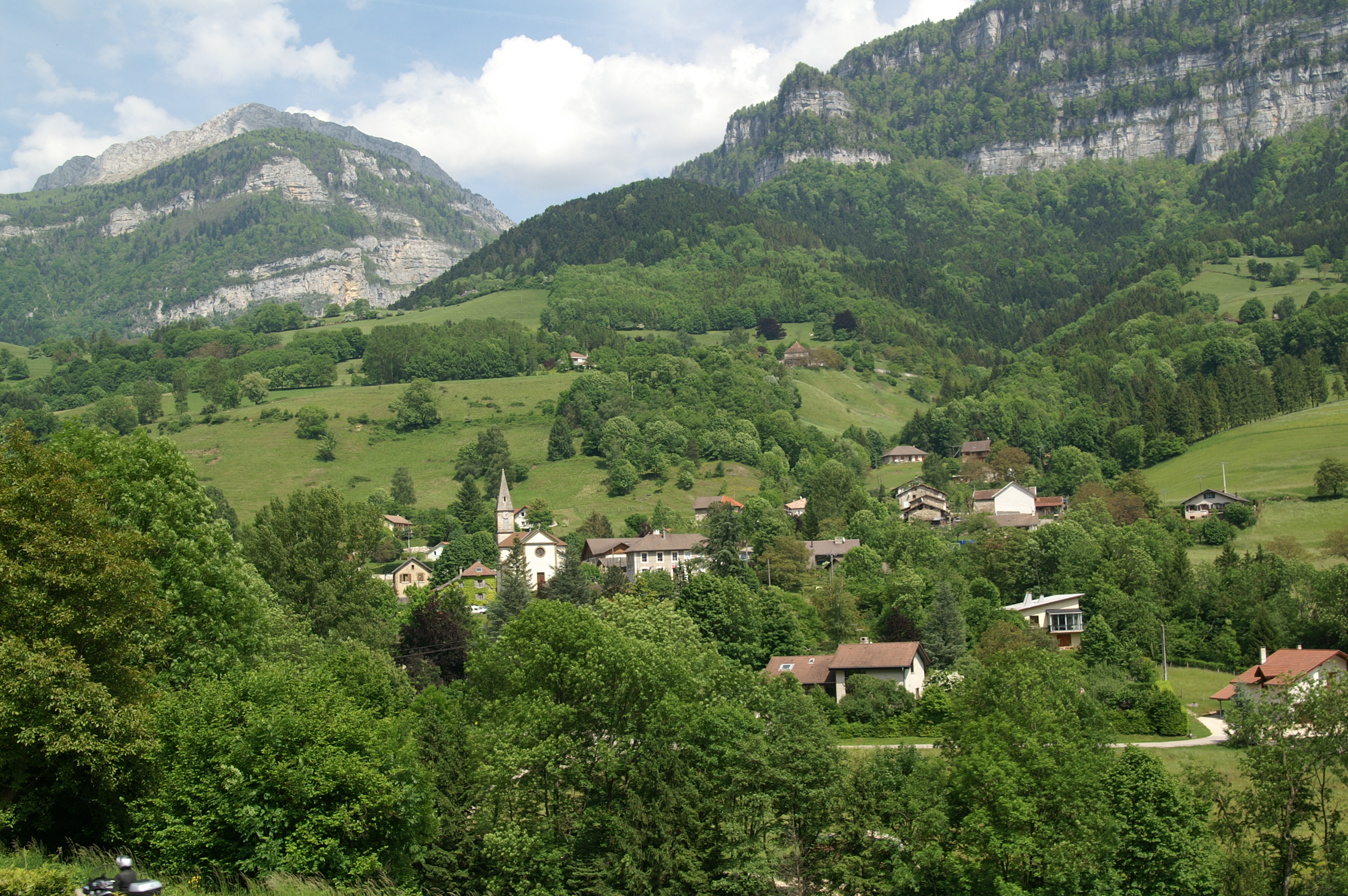
- Location of Pommiers-la-Placette
- Location within France Location within Auvergne-Rhône-Alpes
- Coordinates: 45°19′06″N 5°39′29″E
- Country: France
- Region: Auvergne-Rhône-Alpes
- Department: Isère
- Arrondissement: Grenoble
- Canton: Voiron
- Commune: La Sure en Chartreuse
- Area^{1}: 16.92 km^{2} (6.53 sq mi)
- Highest elevation: 1,849 m (6,066 ft)
- Lowest elevation: 344 m (1,129 ft)
- Population (2014): 561
  - Density: 33.2/km^{2} (85.9/sq mi)
- Time zone: UTC+01:00 (CET)
  - Summer (DST): UTC+02:00 (CEST)
- Postal code: 38340
- ^{1} French Land Register data, which excludes lakes, ponds, glaciers > 1 km^{2} (0.386 sq mi or 247 acres) and river estuaries.

Pommiers-la-Placette (French pronunciation: [pɔmje la plasɛt]) is a former commune in the Isère department in southeastern France. On 1 January 2017, it was merged into the new commune La Sure en Chartreuse.

== Population ==
Historical population

Year	Pop.	±% p.a.
1793	520	—
1821	656	+0.83%
1846	670	+0.08%
1872	531	−0.89%
1901	356	−1.37%
1926	232	−1.70%
1946	214	−0.40%
1962	169	−1.46%

Year	Pop.	±% p.a.
1968	157	−1.22%
1975	260	+7.47%
1982	412	+6.80%
1990	465	+1.52%
1999	586	+2.60%
2006	596	+0.24%
2022	561	−0.38%

Source: EHESS and INSEE

== See also ==
- Communes of the Isère department
