= Saint-Julien-de-Raz =

- Part of La Sure en Chartreuse
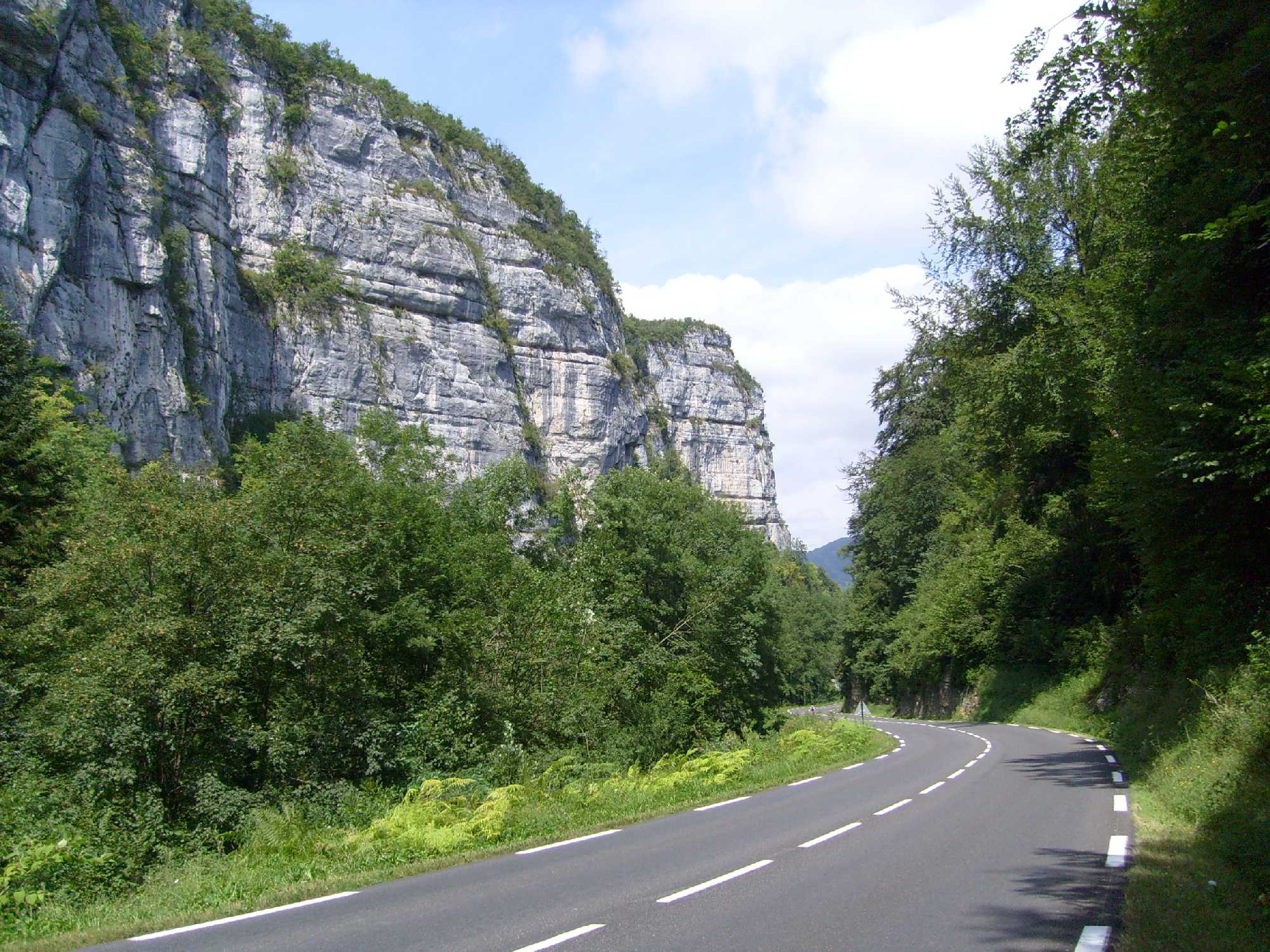
- Location of Saint-Julien-de-Raz
- Location within France Location within Auvergne-Rhône-Alpes
- Coordinates: 45°21′02″N 5°39′45″E
- Country: France
- Region: Auvergne-Rhône-Alpes
- Department: Isère
- Arrondissement: Grenoble
- Canton: Voiron
- Commune: La Sure en Chartreuse
- Area^{1}: 10.81 km^{2} (4.17 sq mi)
- Elevation: 630 m (2,070 ft)
- Highest elevation: 1,891 m (6,204 ft)
- Lowest elevation: 463 m (1,519 ft)
- Population (2014): 428
  - Density: 39.6/km^{2} (103/sq mi)
- Time zone: UTC+01:00 (CET)
  - Summer (DST): UTC+02:00 (CEST)
- Postal code: 38134
- ^{1} French Land Register data, which excludes lakes, ponds, glaciers > 1 km^{2} (0.386 sq mi or 247 acres) and river estuaries.

Saint-Julien-de-Raz is a former commune in the Isère department in southeastern France. On 1 January 2017, it was merged into the new commune La Sure en Chartreuse.

== See also ==
- Communes of the Isère department
