= Zone naturelle d'intérêt écologique, faunistique et floristique =

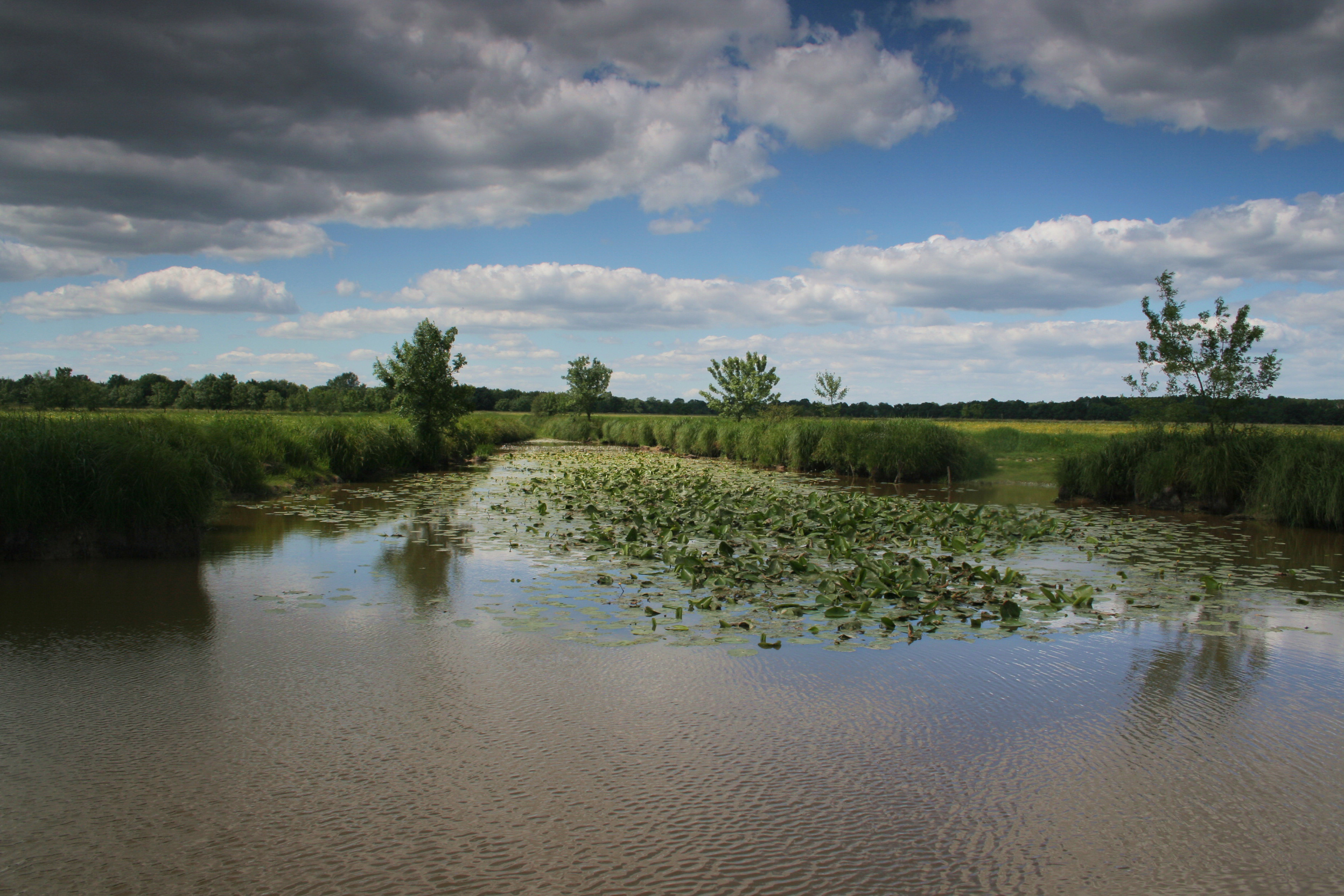
The Ile Saint-Aubin ZNIEFF classified under the Angevin low valleys in Maine-et-Loire.

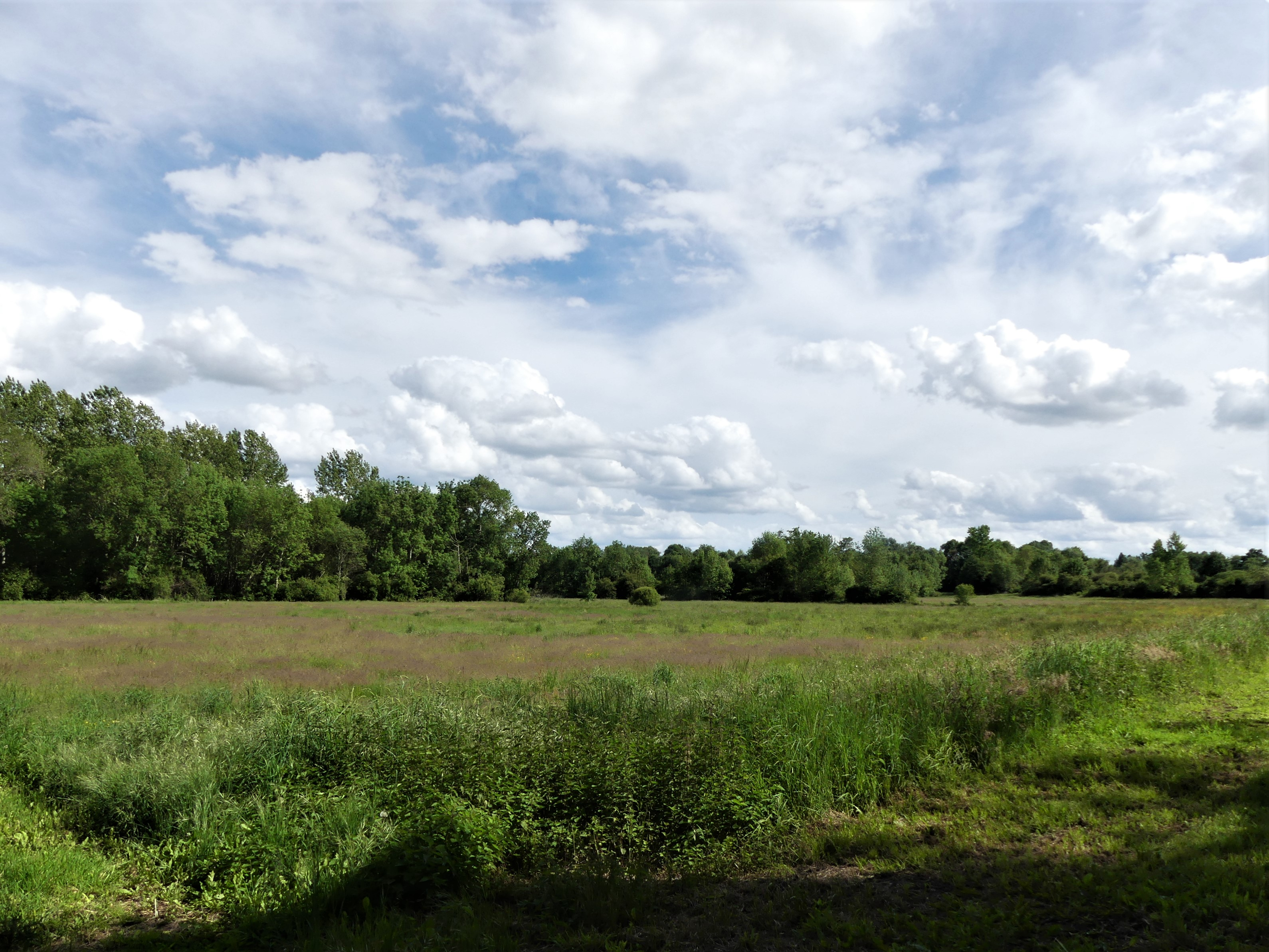
A meadow in Gurat, Charente, classified as ZNIEFF

A Zone naturelle d'intérêt écologique, faunistique et floristique (Natural area of ecological, faunal and floristic interest), abbreviated as ZNIEFF, is a type of natural environment recognized by France.

The inventory of a ZNIEFF area is an inventory of natural resources and scientific program launched in 1982 by Minister of Environment Huguette Bouchardeau and confirmed by the Act of July 12, 1983 called the Bouchardeau act. A ZNIEFF is not a measure of regulatory protection, but an inventory. It corresponds to the census of outstanding natural land areas in the twenty-two metropolitan areas as well as the overseas departments of France. The designation of a ZNIEFF based primarily on the presence of species or groups of species with strong heritage interest. The presence of at least one population of critical species (fr:espèce déterminante in French) defines a ZNIEFF.

This is one of the bases for prioritizing natural heritage issues as part of the National Biodiversity Strategy, or Regional Biodiversity Strategies, National Strategy for creation of protected areas (SCAP), etc. It is used for environmental impact assessment. The Belgian equivalent of the ZNIEFF is the Site of Great Biological Interest (SGIB).

== History ==
- The program was launched in 1982 by the Direction de la protection de la nature (Department of Conservation) (now Direction de la nature et des paysages (Department of Nature and Countryside) of the Ministry of Ecology, Sustainable Development and Energy, with the support of the French National Museum of Natural History; The goal of this undertaking was to produce an inventory for the entire country, areas of greater ecological interest "primarily from the perspective of the Department provide a tool for decision support" (translated).
- The scientific validation of the nature inventories in each region by the Regional Scientific Council of the natural heritage (CSRPN) and nationally by the National Museum of Natural History constitute the heart of the national Inventory of natural Heritage;
- In 1984, the Overseas Department was added to the inventory;
- 1987: 1st publication of an informative brochure and outreach entitled "Notre Patrimoine Naturel" (Our Natural Heritage), on the inventory, with a map scaled at 1:250000 of ZNIEFFs of each region (in 1995, 20 of the 22 metropolitan regions have published such a document, but other atlases and ZNIEFF maps, thematic maps, municipal and platelets extension forms will be published in the regions;
- In March 1990 the National Museum of Natural History is a point on the inventory at a symposium entitled "ZNIEFF, an opportunity to negotiate, towards a network of managed natural areas";
- In 1991, ZNIEFF was adapted for marine environments, with the first phase ending between 1988 and 1995.
- In May 1991, a circular to regional prefect, explained the notion of ZNIEFF indicating the partners involved and specifying the legal scope of the inventory as well as how to access the data. Circular consolidates the former ZNIEFF committees, creating Regional Scientific Councils on Natural Heritage (CSRPN) and creating the positions assistant prefects, under the aegis of fr:Direction régionale de l'Environnement (Regional Directors of the Environment) to control and validate the inventory of each region.
- In 1993, the Countryside Act "the State may decide to develop local and regional inventories of fauna and flora heritage. The local authorities are aware of this development. These inventories are studied under the scientific responsibility of the National Museum of Natural History." (translated)
- In 1993, The ZNIEFFs allow production of the preliminary inventory to the implementation of the European Directive No. 92-43 on the conservation of natural and semi-natural habitats and of wild fauna and flora so-called "Habitats Directive-Fauna-Flora".
- In late 1994, a phase of "modernization of ZNIEFF" was officially launched by the Directorate of nature and countryside. There is talk of a "second generation" inventory;
- 1995: Launch of a ZNIEFF updated with a modernized and refined method (following a seminar of the National Working Committee ZNIEFF and national and regional partners in the inventory, which was held in Paris on 15 November 1994);
- In 1997 French Institute for the Environment and National Museum of Natural History jointly produced at the request of the Ministry of Environment, the first methodological guide clarifying definitions and coordinating and harmonizing regional approaches, which still varied widely. The development of more efficient and less expensive computer tools enabled data processing to facilitate the harmonization of regional inventories primarily driven by Volunteers, under the direction of DRAE (Regional Directorates of architecture and Environment (now since Regional Directorate for the Environment and Regional Directorate of Environment, Planning and Housing);
- The law of 27 February 2002 on grassroots democracy created the National inventory of natural heritage entrusted to the Museum. Article L. 411-5 III of the Code of environment places the responsibility for the scientific coordination of inventory natural heritage programs in MNHN and strengthens CSRPN (Regional Scientific Councils Natural Heritage), allowing in particular, under certain conditions, access to the private property to complete the inventory, even though Europe also imposed more accurate inventories in part of the 'Habitats' Directive or the Water Directive (wetlands, GES ...);
- In 2004, under the leadership of the Museum, the concept of "critical species" was becoming increasingly important, to play a major role in the new characterization ZNIEFF (made by crossing on a scientific basis and biogeographic criteria of rarity, endangered species of protected status of native species and endemism). The method of delimitation of boundaries is refined to be clear and indisputable.

== Contents ==
There are two types of zones:

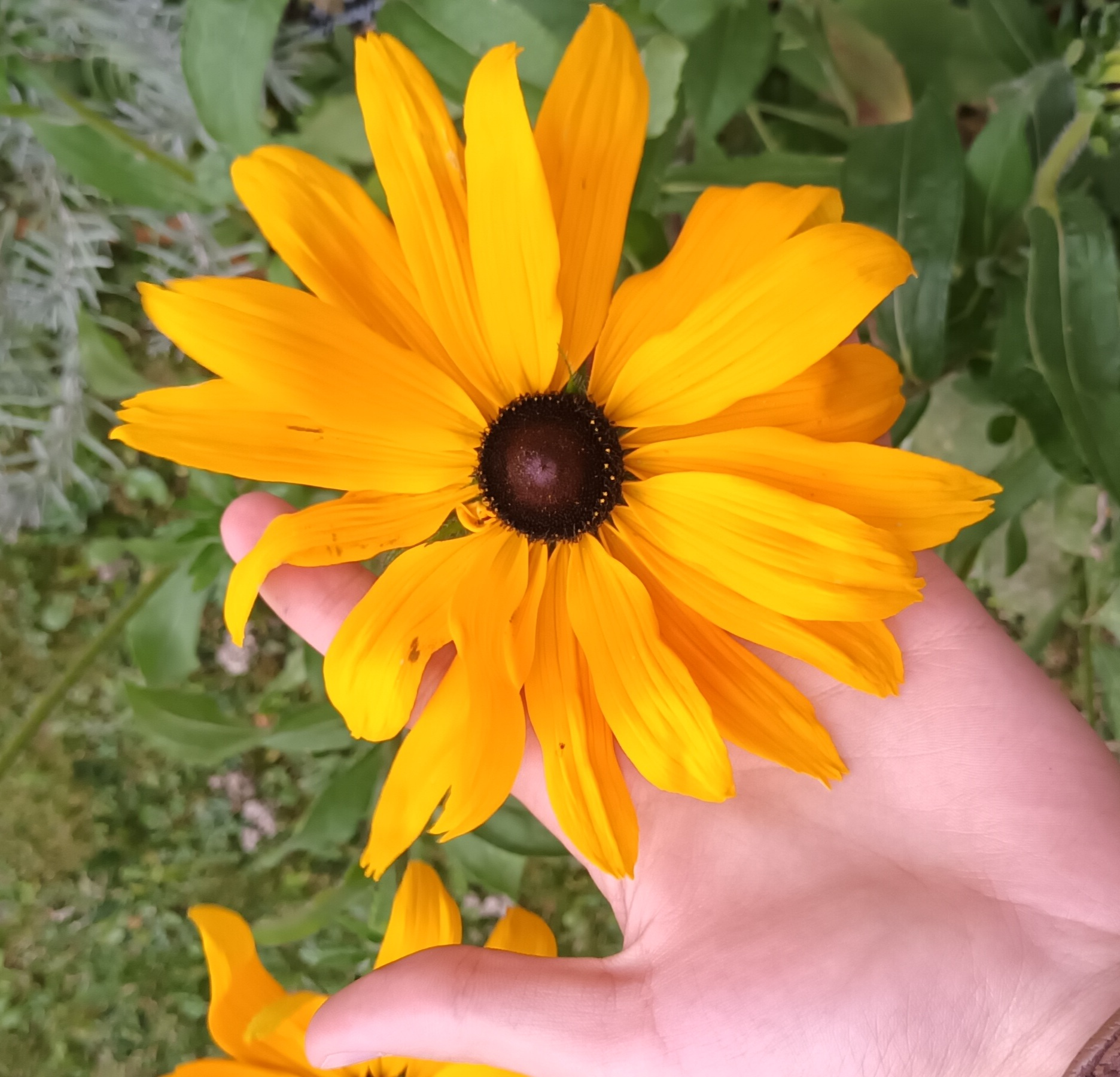
- Comparison between a man's hand and the flower head of a black-eyed Susan.
  The ZNIEFF type I zones, of a small area, are consistent from an ecological point of view and areas that have at least one species and/or rare or threatened habitat, interest both local and regional, national or communal; or these are areas of great functional interest to the local ecological functioning.
- The ZNIEFF type II zones have great rich natural interest, or slightly modified, which offer important biological potential. They may include areas of type I and have a functional as well as ecological and countryside consistency role.

An inventory ZNIEFF second generation was launched in 1996, consisting of an update with harmonization of the methods of carrying out the inventory, better integrating some criteria feature of ecosystem.

Up to 9 April 2013, ZNIEFFs were upgraded and validated for the following territories: Limousin, Normandy (Upper and Lower), Champagne-Ardenne, Picardie, Pays de la Loire, Poitou-Charentes, Provence-Alpes-Côte d'Azur, Rhône-Alpes, Center, Corsica, Languedoc-Roussillon, Ile-de-France (excluding Seine-et-Marne), Auvergne, Nord-Pas-de-Calais, Lot-et-Garonne, Guyana and Saint-Pierre-et-Miquelon.

== Uses ==
This inventory is, in addition to an instrument of knowledge, one of the major elements of French conservation policy and taking into account the environment and spatial planning (green belt, ecological network (including European green infrastructure), protective measures, environmental mitigation, etc.) and in some projects creating protected areas (including nature reserves) or in the development of departmental career paths for the operation of conglomerates.

French jurisprudence confirms that it is not creating an inventory for measuring regulatory protection and does not prohibit planning. However, it must be included in all the accompanying planning documents

== See also ==
=== Search Engines ZNIEFF (INPN) ===
- Rechercher une ZNIEFF terrestre (French)
- Rechercher une ZNIEFF marine (French)

=== Related Articles ===
- Habitat conservation
- Endangered species
- fr:Espèce déterminante (French)
- fr:Espèce remarquable (French)
- Habitat
- Ecosystem approach
- Biodiversity
- Site of Community Importance
- Grande Sure
- fr:Direction régionale de l'environnement, de l'aménagement et du logement (French)
- fr:Plan de restauration (French)

=== Bibliography ===
- Maurin, H.; Theys, J.; Feraudy, (de) E.; Duhautois, L. (1997). Guide méthodologique sur la modernisation de l'inventaire des zones naturelles d'intérêt écologique, faunistique et floristique [Methodological guide for the modernization of the inventory of natural areas of ecological interest, flora and fauna]. Notes de Méthode (in French). Vol. ColI. Orléans: nstitut Français de l'Environnement. p. 66.
- Elissalde-Videment, L.; Horellou, A.; Humbert, G.; Moret, J. (2004). Guide méthodologique sur la modernisation de l'inventaire des zones naturelles d'intérêt écologique, faunistique et floristique [Methodological guide for the modernization of the inventory of natural areas of ecological interest, flora and fauna] (PDF). Patrimoines Naturels (in French). Paris: Muséum National d’Histoire Naturelle. pp. 73 (92 on PDF version). Archived from the original (PDF) on 2016-03-14.
- Le Corre, Laurent; Noury, Arnaud (1996). "Un inventaire du patrimoine naturel : les Z.N.I.E.F.F." Revue juridique de l'Environnement (in French). 4: 387–407.
- Clap, Florence (2005). Analyse multicritère de la jurisprudence 20 ans après [MCA jurisprudence 20 years later] (PDF) (in French). p. 134. Archived from the original (PDF) on 23 March 2014.
- Cans, C (1996). La ZNIEFF : un révélateur de richesses naturelles. De la double nature des ZNIEFF : outil de rassemble ment des connaissances pouvant servir de référence scientifique à une décision [The ZNIEFF: an indicator of natural resources. The dual nature of ZNIEFF: knowledge gathering tool that can be used for scientific reference for decision making] (in French). Ministère de l’Environnement.
- Liber, C (2002). L’inventaire ZNIEFF en Languedoc-roussillon. La modernisation de l’inventaire. Proposition pour une stratégie nationale [The ZNIEFF in Languedoc-Roussillon. The modernization of the inventory. Proposal for a national strategy] (in French). CSRPN & DIREN Languedoc-Roussillon.
- Maurin, H; Theys, J; Feraudy, (de) E (1997). Guide méthodologique sur la modernisation de l’inventaire des ZNIEFF [Methodological guide the modernization of ZNIEFF inventories]. Note de Méthode (in French). Orleans: IFEN. p. 66.
