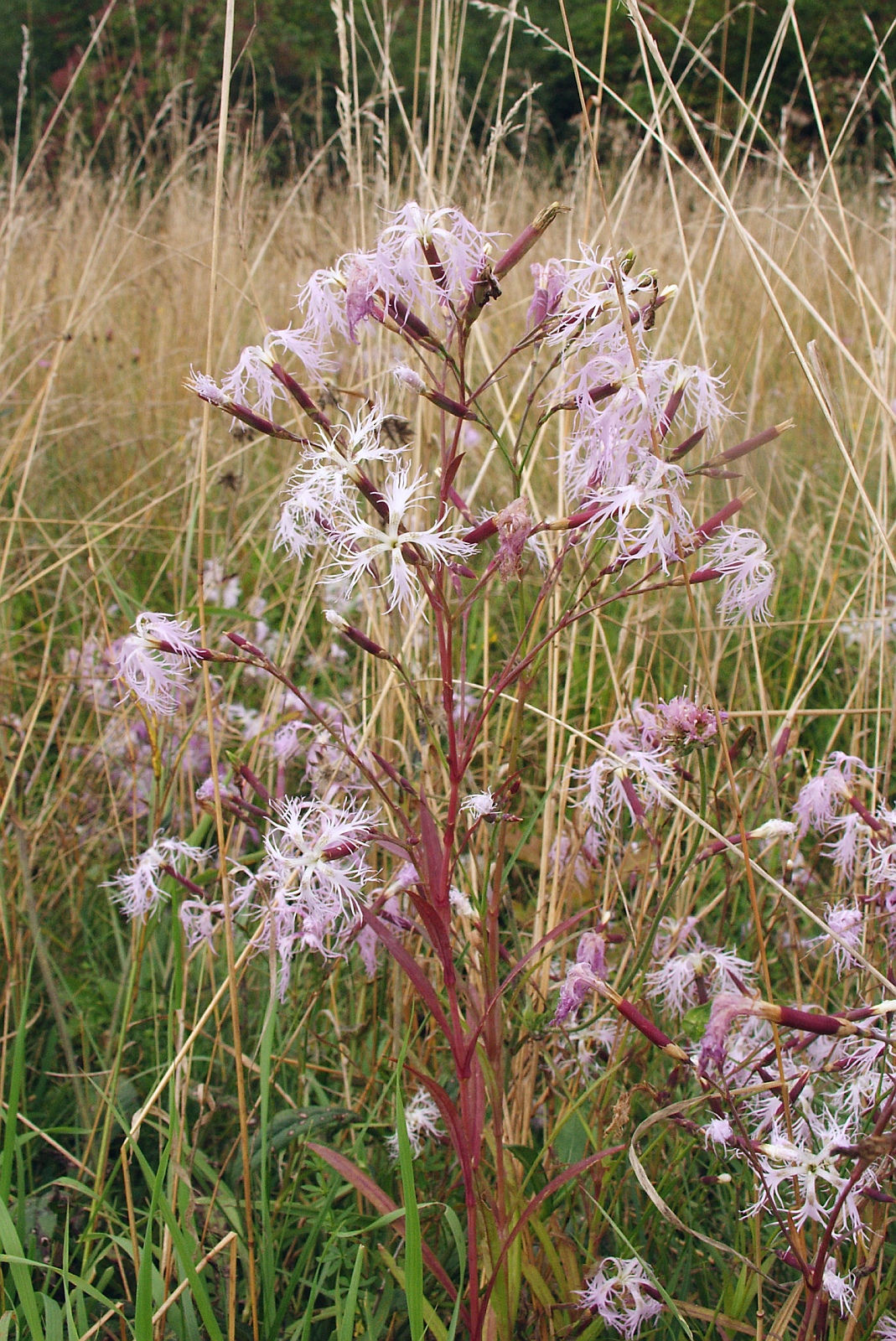

Scientific classification
- Kingdom: Plantae
- Clade: Tracheophytes
- Clade: Angiosperms
- Clade: Eudicots
- Order: Caryophyllales
- Family: Caryophyllaceae
- Genus: Dianthus
- Species: D. superbus

Binomial name
- Dianthus superbus L.

= Dianthus superbus =

Species of flowering plant

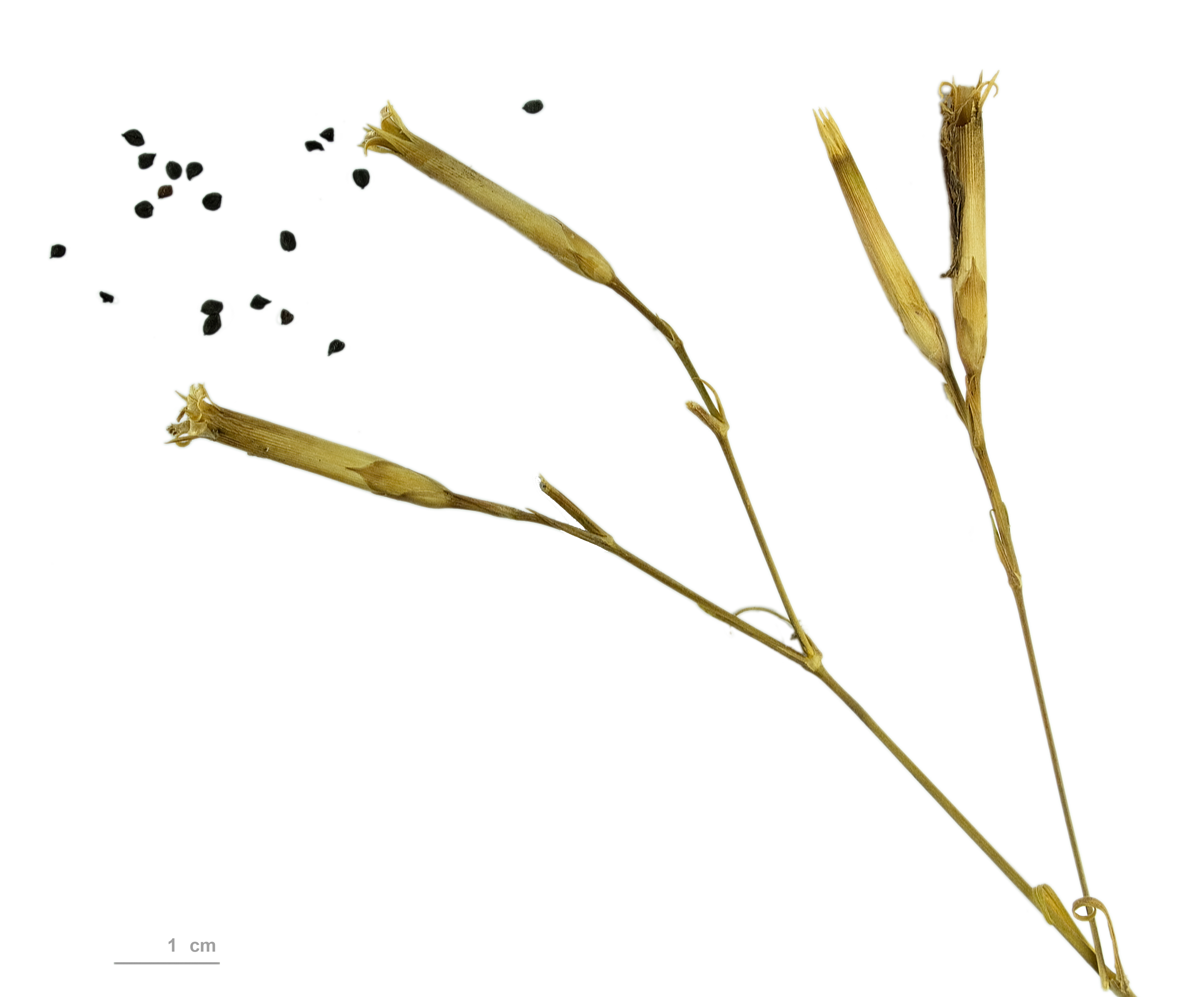
Dianthus superbus - MHNT

Dianthus superbus, the fringed pink or large pink, is a species of Dianthus native to Europe and northern Asia, from France north to arctic Norway, and east to Japan; in the south of its range, it occurs at high altitudes, up to 2,400 m.

It is a herbaceous perennial plant growing to 80 cm tall. The leaves are green to greyish green, slender, up to 8 cm long. The flowers are sweetly scented, 3–5 cm in diameter, with five deeply cut fringed petals, pink to lavender with a greenish base; they are produced in branched clusters at the top of the stems from early to late summer.

There are six subspecies:

- Dianthus superbus subsp. superbus. Most of the species' range.
- Dianthus superbus subsp. autumnalis Oberd. Southwestern France.
- Dianthus superbus subsp. sylvestris Čelak. Germany.
- Dianthus superbus subsp. alpestris Kablík. ex Čelak. (syn. D. s. subsp. speciosus). Alps, Carpathians, at high altitudes. Shorter stems; leaves greyer; flowers large.
- Dianthus superbus subsp. stenocalyx (Trautv. ex Juz.) Kleopow. Southern Russia, Ukraine.
- Dianthus superbus subsp. longicalycinus (Maxim.) Kitam. Japan. Also called nadeshiko (ナデシコ).

It is the only food source of the large moth Coleophora musculella.

== Cultivation and uses ==
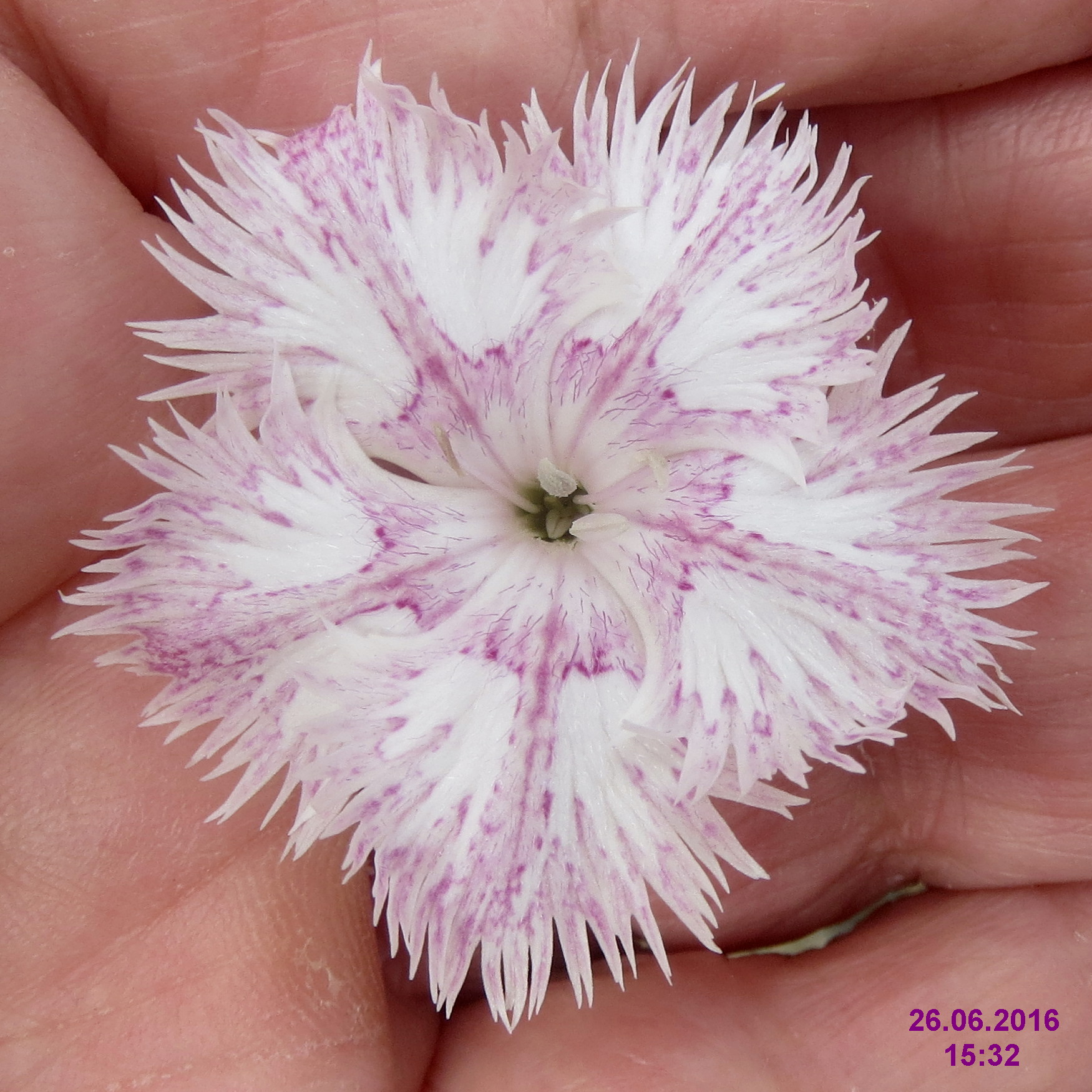
"Tatra ghost", a selected seedling of subsp. alpestris

Dianthus superbus is a popular garden plant and several cultivars and hybrids have been selected, with flower colour varying from white to red or purple, usually with a green centre. It thrives in ordinary to dry soil in full sun; partial shade is preferred in hot climates. It is self-sowing and can be propagated by seed, by division of the roots, layering of the stems or cuttings from growing shoots. Deadheading extends the blooming period. The flowers sit atop stems approximately 25–45 cm tall, while the gray-green linear leaves form a mat at the base of the plant 20–30 cm wide. Because D. superbus is low to the ground, those who want to enjoy its fragrance find planting it in groups desirable.

The leaves are edible when young, and can be eaten when boiled. The flowers contain sweet nectar, and the foliage can be eaten or boiled to make a drink. The plant contains toxic saponins, but not enough to be harmful. It has historically been used in Chinese herbology as a contraceptive, diuretic, and anti-infective; its Chinese name is qúmài (瞿麦).

== Cultural significance ==
The yamato nadeshiko (D. superbus longicalycinus) is metaphorically associated with traditional, idealized feminine beauty, in Japanese culture.
