= Johann Gottlob Mühlig =

Johann Gottfried Gottlob Mühlig (29 January 1812, Kalbsrieth – 12 April 1884, Frankfurt am Main) was a German ornithologist and entomologist.

Mühlig is best known for his studies of Microlepidoptera. He described several new species including Coleophora odorariella and Coleophora asteris. He was a Member of the Entomological Society of Stettin and a friend of the Swiss entomologist Heinrich Frey.
