= House of Clermont-Tonnerre =

French noble family

Clermont-Tonnerre
- Country: Kingdom of France
- Titles: Duke of Clermont; Duke of Clermont-Tonnerre; Marquis of Cruzy and Vauvillers; Marquis of Mont-Saint-Jean; Count of Clermont in Viennois
- Cadet branches: Clermont-Cruzy; Clermont-Thoury; Clermont-Mont-Saint-Jean; Clermont-Montoison; Clermont-Chaste

The House of Clermont-Tonnerre is a French noble family, members of which played some part in the history of France, especially in Dauphiné, from about 1100 to the French Revolution (1789–99).

== History ==
Sibaud, lord of Clermont in Viennois, who first appears in 1080, was the founder of the family. His descendant, another Sibaud, commanded some troops which aided Pope Calixtus II in his struggle with the Antipope Gregory VIII. In return for this service, it is said that the pope allowed him to add certain emblems, two keys and a tiara to the arms of his family.

A direct descendant, Ainard (died 1349), called Viscount of Clermont, was granted the dignity of captain-general and first baron of Dauphiné by his suzerain Humbert, dauphin of Viennois, in 1340; and in 1547 Clermont was made a county for Antoine (died 1578), who was governor of Dauphiné and the French king's lieutenant in Savoy. In 1572, Antoine's son Henri was created a duke, but as this was only a brevet title it did not descend to his son. Henri was killed before La Rochelle in 1573. In 1596 Henri's son, Charles Henri, count of Clermont (died 1640), added Tonnerre to his heritage; but in 1648 this county was sold by his son and successor, François (died 1679).

A member of a younger branch of Charles Henri's descendants was Gaspard de Clermont-Tonnerre (1688–1781). This soldier served his country during a long period, fighting in Bohemia and Alsace, and then distinguishing himself greatly at the battles of Fontenoy and Lawfeldt. In 1775, he was created Duke of Clermont-Tonnerre, and made a peer of France. As the senior marshal (c. 1747) of France, he assisted as constable at the Coronation of Louis XVI in 1775. His son and successor, Charles Henri Jules, governor of Dauphiné, was guillotined in July 1794, a fate which his grandson, Gaspard Charles, had suffered at Lyon in the previous year.

A later duke, Aimé Marie Gaspard (1779–1865), served for some years as a soldier, afterwards becoming minister of marine and then minister of war under Charles X during the last days of the Bourbon Restoration, in the cabinet of the Count de Villèle. He retired to private life after the revolution of 1830. Aimé's grandson, Roger, duke of Clermont-Tonnerre, was born in 1842.

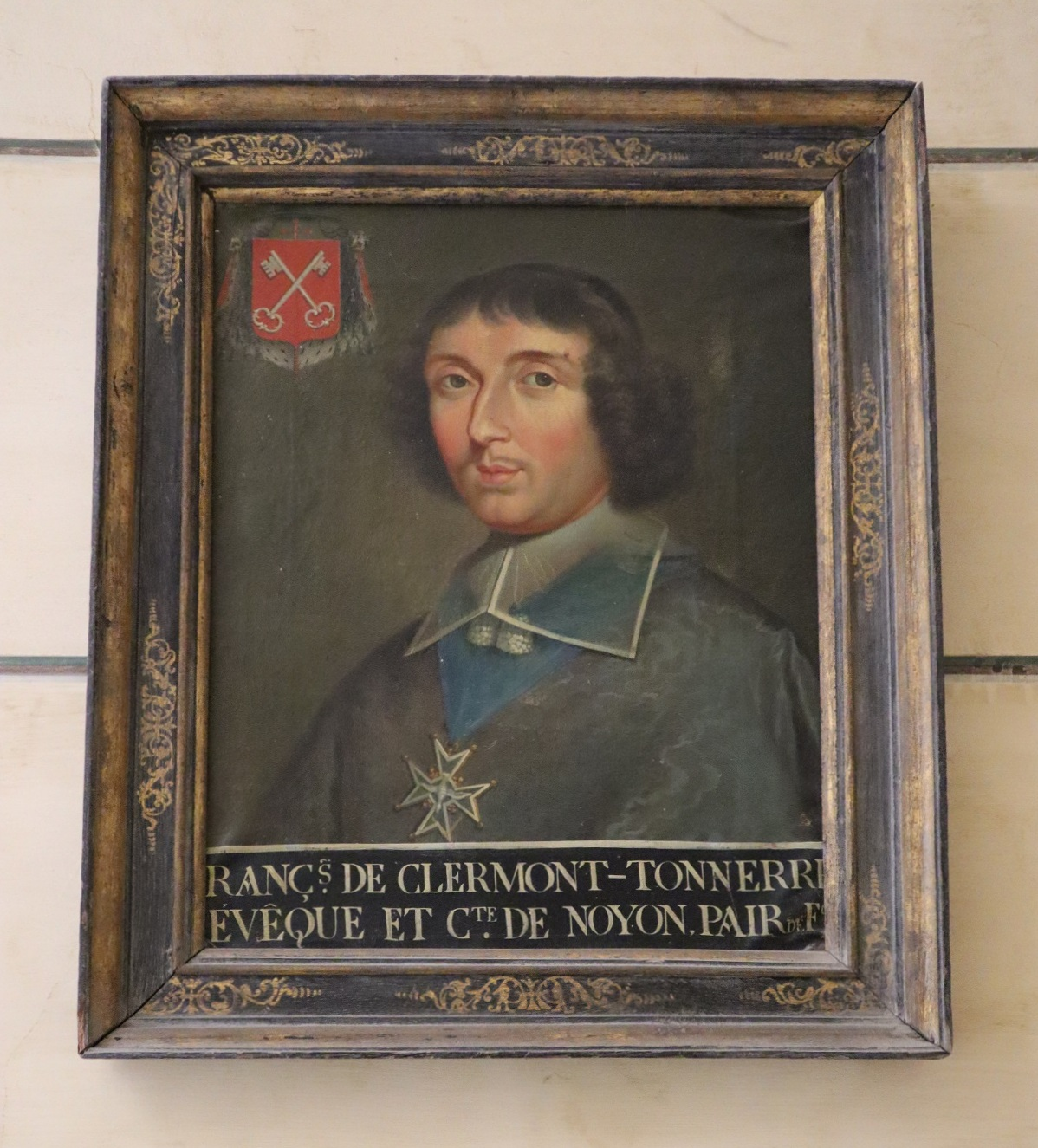
François de Clermont-Tonnerre (1629–1701)

Among other distinguished members of this family was Catherine (c. 1545 – 1603), daughter of Claude de Clermont-Tonnerre. This lady, dame d'honneur to Henry II's queen, Catherine de' Medici, and afterwards wife of Albert de Gondi, duc de Retz, won a great reputation by her intellectual attainments, being referred to as the tenth muse and the fourth grace. One of her grandsons was the famous Cardinal de Retz.

Other noteworthy members of collateral branches of the family were: François (1629–1701), bishop of Noyon from 1661 until his death, a member of the French Academy, notorious for his inordinate vanity; Stanislas Marie Adelaide, comte de Clermont-Tonnerre; and Anne Antoine Jules (1749–1830), cardinal and bishop of Châlons-sur-Marne, who was a member of the states-general in 1789, afterwards retiring to Germany, and after the return of the Bourbons to France became Archbishop of Toulouse.

In 1909, Peter Kropotkin tells the story of one military commander, Clermont-Tonnerre, who in 1788 promulgated the edict which dissolved the parlement of the people of Grenoble during the French Revolution. The tocsin was rung, and the alarm spreading quickly to the neighboring villages, the peasants hastened in crowds the town. There was combat between civilians and soldiers, and many were killed. After street skirmishing, the commander's guard was rendered helpless, and Clermont-Tonnerre's palace was sacked. Clermont-Tonnerre, with an axe held over his head, had to revoke the royal edict.

== Titles ==
- Count of Clermont in Viennois, 24 December 1547, by letter from the King Henry II.
- Duke of Clermont and Peer of France, by patent 1 May 1571, by King Charles IX, confirmation on 10 June 1572.
- Marquis of Cruzy and Vauvillers, in 1620.
- Duke of Clermont and Peer of France, by letters patent of June 1755, given at Versailles.
- Baron of the Empire, by letters patent of 2 April 1812.
- Count of the Empire, for Louis, Baron of Clermont-Thoury.
- Hereditary Peer, by letter patent of 19 August 1815.
- Hereditary Duke-Peer, by letter patent of 31 August 1817.
- Duke of Clermont-Tonnerre, in a personal capacity by Cardinal Jules de Clermont-Tonnerre, by order of 8 January 1823.
- Roman Prince, by pontifical brief of 1825, for Duke Gaspard Paulin de Clermont-Tonnerre, confirmation of the title on 1 August 1811.
- Hereditary Marquis, by letters patent of King Charles X, on 4 August 1829, on the institution of the increase in the land of Bertangles.
- Marquis of Mont-Saint-Jean (St-Pierre-de-Soucy), by letters patent of the Duke of Savoy on 26 September 1681.

=== Other titles ===
- Marquis of Mont-Saint-Jean (1681) (according to Father Anselme and his successors, the Chevalier de Courcelles)
- Viscount of Clermont-en-Trièves (today Monestier-de-Clermont), Premier Baron, Constable and Hereditary Grand Master of Dauphiné (1340)
- Viscount of Tallard (1439)
- Count of Thunder (1496)
- Count of Thoury (1629)
- Marquis of Montoison (1630)
- Duke of Piney-Luxembourg, Peer of France (1631)
- Prince of Tingry (1631)
- Baron and Count of Dannemoine (1651)
- Count of Roussillon (1670)
- Marquis of La Bâtie d'Albanais (1681)
- Count of Saint-Cassin (1681)
- Marquis of Chaste (1688)
- Count of Épinac (1719)
- Marquis of Clermont-Tonnerre (1750) (confirmed in 1830)
- Duke of Clermont-Tonnerre, Peer of France (1775) (the duchy is based on the marquisate of Vauvillers)
- Baron de Courcelles
- Baron of Maupertuis
- Count of Mannevillette
- Marquis of Crèvecœur
- Count of Morges
- Lords of Aiguebelette-le-Lac (1305), of Clermont (1305).

Note that certain titles, coming from other families, appeared thanks to women, such as those of Duke of Retz (and Barons of Surgères, Dampierre, Vivonne) and Duke of Uzès.

== Branches ==
- Branch of the lords of Clermont, then counts of Clermont and Tonnerre
- Branch of the Marquises of Cruzy, then Dukes of Clermont-Tonnerre
- Branch of the Counts of Thoury then Marquis of Clermont-Tonnerre (Lord of Bertangles)
- Branch of the Marquises of Montoison
- Branches of the lords of Hauterives and Surgères
- Branch of the lords of Chaste, then marquis of Charpey and Chaste
- Branch of the lords of Chaste-Gessans
- Branch of the marquises of Clermont-Mont-Saint-Jean (in Saint-Pierre-de-Soucy), established in Savoy, and of the Lords of Rubaud.

Most of these branches have died out, only the branch of the dukes and that of the marquises remain today. All descend from Siboud I, Baron of Clermont, and Adélaïs d'Albon who lived in 1080.

== Châteaux and mansions ==
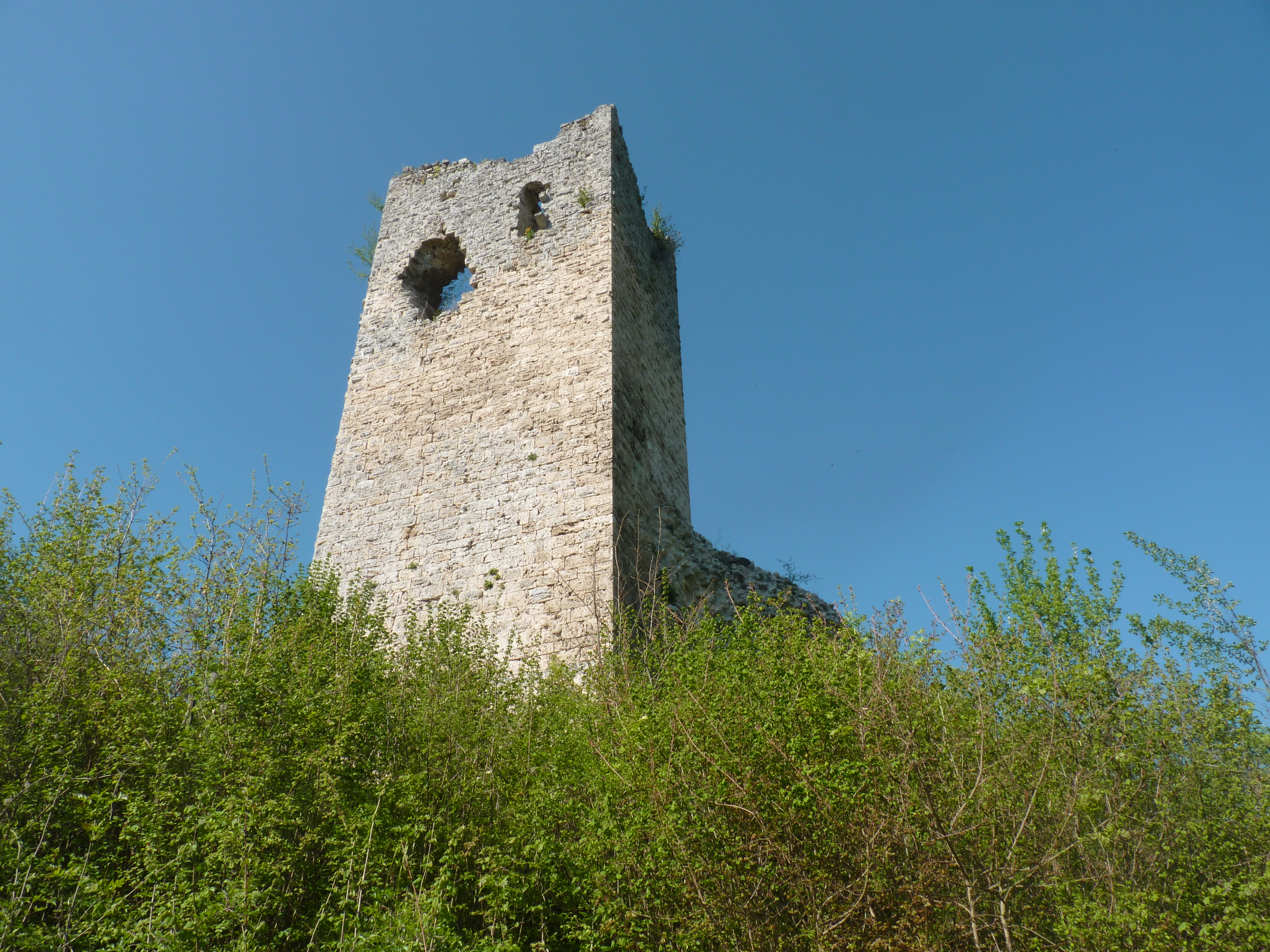
Tower, the only remains of the Château de Clermont, now in the commune of Chirens.

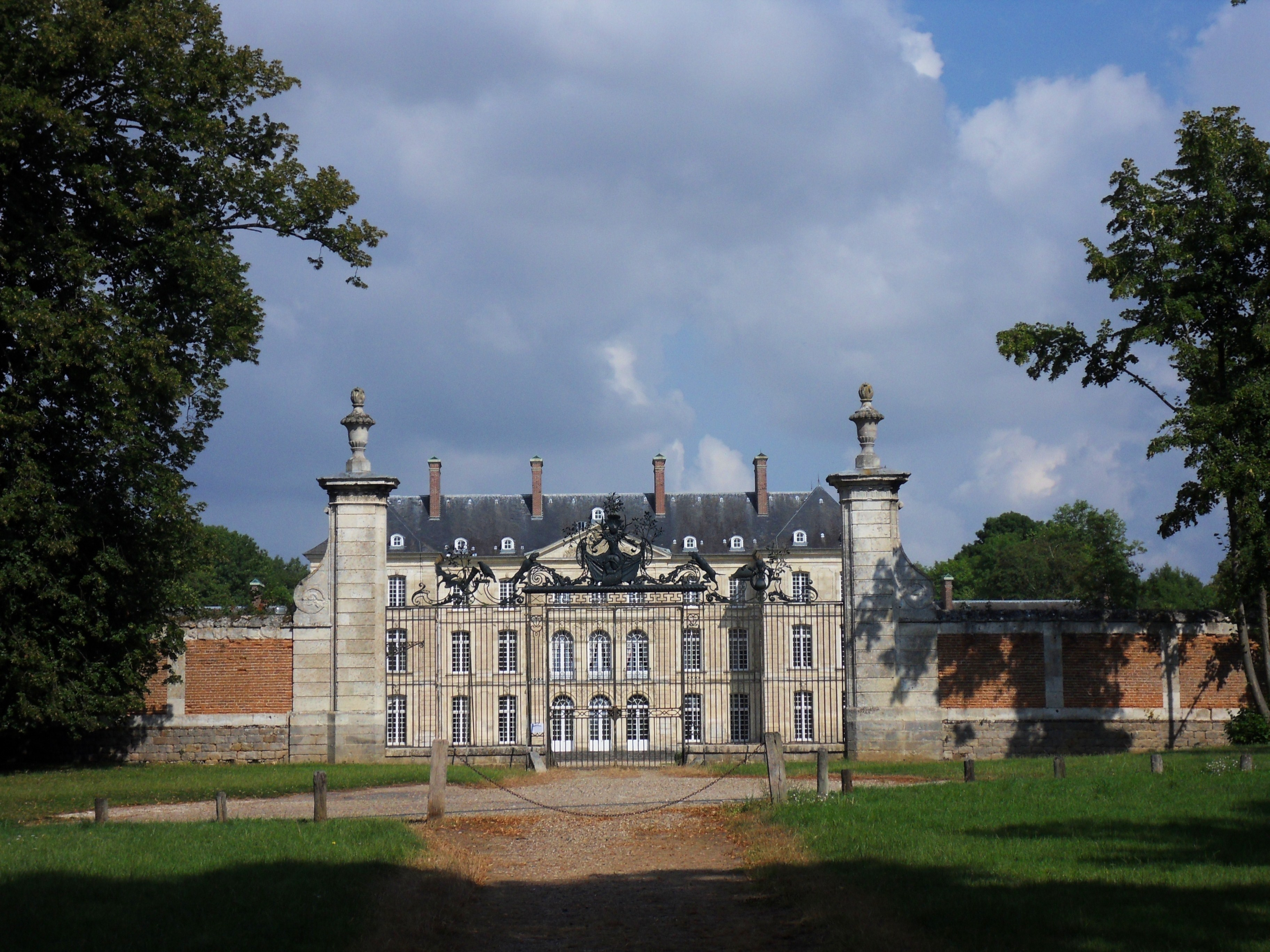
Château de Bertangles behind its gate.

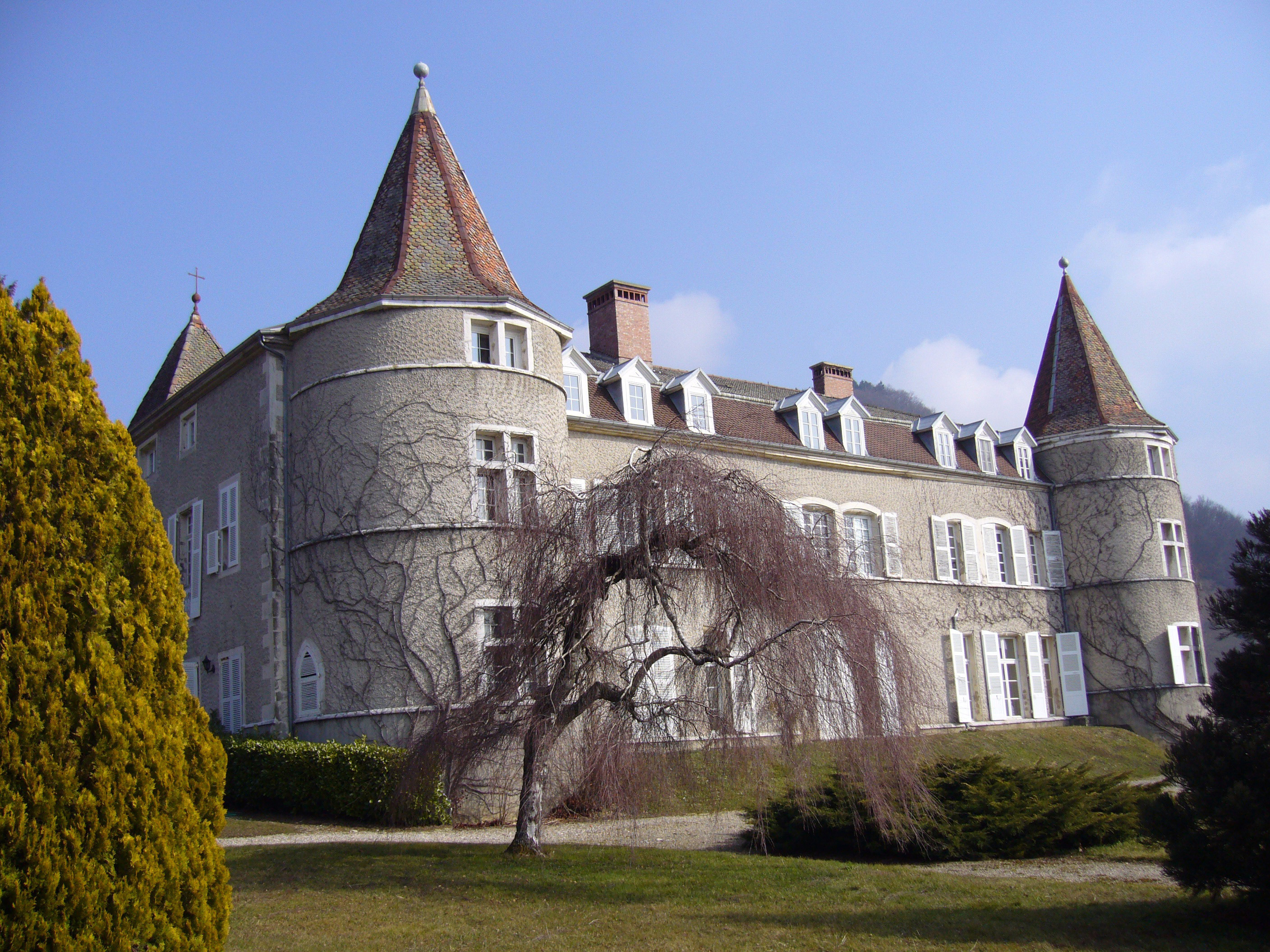
Château de Hautefort (Isère), owned by the Clermont family from 1080 to 1537.

=== Châteaux ===
- Château d'Achy (Oise)
- Château d'Aiguebelette-le-Lac in Aiguebelette-le-Lac
- Château d'Ancy-le-Franc (Yonne)
- Château de Bertangles (Somme)
- Château de Bressieux in Bressieux
- Château de Brugny
- Château de Château-Neuf in Cessens
- Château de Château-Vieux in Cessens
- Château de Clermont in Chirens
- Château de Clermont in Saint-Geoire-en-Valdaine
- Château de Crépol in Crépol
- Château de Dampierre-sur-Boutonne
- Château d'Épinac
- Château de Glisolles (Eure)
- Château de Hautefort (Isère)
- Château de La Grange-aux-Ormes
- Château de Maupertuis
- Château de Maulnes (Yonne)
- Château de Messey-sur-Grosne
- Château de Muides-sur-Loire
- Château du Passage in Passage
- Château de Roussillon
- Château de Surgères
- Château de Tallard in Tallard
- Château de Vaulichères
- Château de Vauvillers
- Château de Virieu in Virieu

=== Hôtels ===
- Hôtel de Clermont-Tonnerre (rue de Bac)
- Hôtel de Clermont-Tonnerre (place des Vosges)
- Hôtel de Clermont-Tonnerre (27 quai de La Tournelle)
- Hôtel de Clermont-Tonnerre (12 rue François); headquarters of Groupe Artémis

== List of dukes of Clermont-Tonnerre ==
=== First creation (1571 and 1572) ===
- Henri de Clermont (1540–1573), Viscount of Tallard, Duke of Clermont (created 1571), then Duke of Tonnerre (created 1572) and Peer of France.

=== Second creation (1775) ===
- Gaspard de Clermont-Tonnerre (1688–1781), Marquis of Cruzy and Vauvillers (known as Clermont-Tonnerre), then 1st Duke of Clermont-Tonnerre (created in 1775) and Peer of France, Marshal of France
- Jules Charles Henri de Clermont-Tonnerre (1720–1794), son of the previous, 2nd Duke of Clermont-Tonnerre and peer of France .
- Jules Gaspard Aynard de Clermont-Tonnerre (1769–1837), grandson of the previous, 3rd Duke of Clermont-Tonnerre and peer of France .
- Gaspard Paulin de Clermont-Tonnerre (1753–1842), uncle of the previous, 4th Duke of Clermont-Tonnerre and peer of France, Roman Prince of Clermont-Tonnerre.
- Aimé Marie Gaspard de Clermont-Tonnerre (1779–1865), son of the previous, 5th Duke of Clermont-Tonnerre and peer of France, minister.
- Gaspard Louis Aimé de Clermont-Tonnerre (1812–1889), son of the previous, 6th Duke of Clermont-Tonnerre and peer of France.
- Gaspard Aimé Charles Roger de Clermont-Tonnerre (1842–1910), son of the previous, 7th Duke of Clermont-Tonnerre.
- Aimé François Philibert de Clermont-Tonnerre (1871–1940), son of the previous, 8th Duke of Clermont-Tonnerre.
- Marie Joseph Victor Fernand Aynard de Clermont-Tonnerre (1884–1967), first cousin of the above, 9th Duke of Clermont-Tonnerre.
- Marie Joseph Charles Aimé Jean de Clermont-Tonnerre (1885–1970), brother of the previous, 10th Duke of Clermont-Tonnerre.
- Charles Henri Marie Gérard Gabriel de Clermont-Tonnerre (1934–1999), son of the previous, 11th Duke of Clermont-Tonnerre.
- Aynard Jean Marie Antoine de Clermont-Tonnerre (b. 1962), son of the previous, 12th Duke of Clermont-Tonnerre.

== See also ==
- Adélaïde de Clermont-Tonnerre
- Hermine de Clermont-Tonnerre
- Laure de Clermont-Tonnerre
