= Claremont =

Claremont may refer to:

== Places ==
=== Australia ===
- Claremont, Ipswich, a heritage-listed house in Queensland
- Claremont, Tasmania, a suburb of Hobart
- Claremont, Western Australia, a suburb of Perth
- Town of Claremont, Perth
- Claremont Airbase, an aerial firefighting base near Brukunga, South Australia

=== United Kingdom ===
- Claremont (country house), a stately house in Surrey
- Claremont, Salford, Greater Manchester
- Claremont (ward), electoral ward for Claremont, Salford
- Claremont Square, a square in Islington, London

=== United States ===
- Claremont, California
- Claremont, Oakland/Berkeley, California, a neighborhood in two adjoining cities
  - Claremont Hotel & Spa
- Claremont, Illinois
- Claremont, Minnesota
- Claremont, Mississippi
- Claremont (Port Gibson, Mississippi), a historic house
- Claremont, New Hampshire
- Claremont, North Carolina
- Claremont, South Carolina
- Claremont, South Dakota
- Claremont, Virginia
- Claremont, West Virginia
- Claremont Township, Richland County, Illinois
- Claremont Township, Dodge County, Minnesota

=== Elsewhere ===
- Claremont, Ontario, Canada
- Claremont, Jamaica
- Claremont, Johannesburg, South Africa
- Claremont, Cape Town, South Africa
- Claremont, a suburb in the western side of Pretoria, South Africa

== Education ==
- Claremont Colleges, Claremont, California, a consortium of seven private institutions of higher education
  - Claremont Graduate University
- Claremont School of Theology, Claremont, California
- Claremont High School (disambiguation)
- Claremont Secondary School, Saanich, British Columbia, Canada, a high school

== People ==
- Claremont (surname)

== Other uses ==
- Claremont Football Club, based in Caremount, West Australia
  - Claremont Oval, home stadium for the Claremont Football Club
- Claremont Institute, a conservative think tank
- Claremont Review of Books, a quarterly review
- "Claremont", a poem by Samuel Garth
- Claremont Airport (disambiguation)
- Claremont Hotel (disambiguation)
- Claremont station (disambiguation)

== See also ==
- Claremount, County Westmeath, Ireland, a townland
- Clairemont (disambiguation)
- Clairmont (disambiguation)
- Clermont (disambiguation)
