= Clairmont =

Clairmont, with French roots meaning "clear/light-colored/shining hill/mountain", may refer to:

== People ==
- Clairmont (surname)

== Places ==
- Clairmont, Alberta, a hamlet in northern Alberta, Canada
- Clairmont, New Mexico, Catron County, New Mexico
- Clairmont, U.S. Virgin Islands, a settlement on the island of Saint Croix
- Clairmont Road, a thoroughfare in the state of Georgia

== See also ==
- Clairemont (disambiguation)
- Claremont (disambiguation)
- Claremont Hotel (disambiguation)
- Clermont (disambiguation)
- Montclair (disambiguation), an inversion
