= Claremont School =

Claremont School may refer to:

== Colleges and universities ==
- Claremont Colleges, in Claremont, California
- Claremont Graduate University
- Claremont School of Theology, Claremont, California

== Primary and secondary schools ==
- Claremont High School (California)
- Clairemont High School, Clairemont Mesa, San Diego, California
- Claremont High School Historic District, on the National Register of Historic Places in Catawba County, North Carolina
- Claremont School, Baltimore, a special needs day school
- Claremont High School (Cape Town), South Africa
- Claremont High School (Tasmania), Australia
- Claremont High School, Kenton, London, England
- Claremont High School, East Kilbride, South Lanarkshire, Scotland
- Claremont Secondary School, Saanich, British Columbia, Canada
- Claremont Fan Court School, Esher, a merger in 1978 of Claremont School and Fan Court School

== See also ==
- Claremont High School (disambiguation)
