= Clermont =

Clermont may refer to:

== Places ==
=== Australia ===
- Clermont, Queensland, a town in the Isaac Region

=== Belgium ===
- Clermont-sur-Berwinne, a town in Wallonia

=== Canada ===
- Clermont, Prince Edward Island
- Clermont, Abitibi-Témiscamingue, Quebec
- Clermont, Capitale-Nationale, Quebec

=== France ===
- Clermont, Ariège, in the Ariège département
- Clermont, Haute-Savoie, in the Haute-Savoie département
- Clermont, Landes, in the Landes département
- Clermont, Oise, sous-préfecture of the Oise département
  - Arrondissement of Clermont, in the Oise département
- Clermont-Ferrand, in the Puy-de-Dôme département

=== Greece ===
- Chlemoutsi, Greece, originally named Clermont

=== Ireland ===
- Clermont Carn, a mountain in County Louth, Ireland

=== South Africa ===
- Clermont, KwaZulu-Natal, a township in Durban, South Africa

=== United States ===
- Clermont, Florida, a city
- Clermont, Georgia, a town
- Clermont, Indiana, a town
- Clermont, Iowa, a city
- Clermont, Kentucky, a USGS-designated populated place
- Clermont, Burlington County, New Jersey, an unincorporated community
- Clermont, Cape May County, New Jersey, an unincorporated community
- Clermont, New York, a town
- Clermont State Historic Site, New York, location of Clermont Manor, home of Robert Livingston (1688–1775)
- Clermont County, Ohio
- Clermont (Alexandria, Virginia), a plantation
- Clermont (Berryville, Virginia), a farm

== People ==
- Clermont (surname), a list of people with the surname Clermont or de Clermont
- Clermont Huger Lee (1914–2006), American landscape architect
- House of Clermont, a French noble family dating back to the 10th century
- Any holders of the title Viscount Clermont and Baron Clermont in Ireland

== Sports ==
- ASM Clermont Auvergne, a French rugby union club from Clermont-Ferrand
- Clermont Foot, a French football club from Clermont-Ferrand
- Clermont UC, a defunct French multisports club from Clermont-Ferrand

== Other uses ==
- Roman Catholic Archdiocese of Clermont (i.e. Clermont-Ferrand), established in the first century A.D.
- Council of Clermont, a council of the Roman Catholic Church (1095 AD) that is said to have led to the Crusades
- Clermont (novel), a 1798 Gothic novel by Regina Maria Roche
- Clermont Club, a private gambling club in London, England
- Clermont, colloquial name of the North River Steamboat Robert Fulton's first steamboat
- Clermont Group, a Singapore-based conglomerate
- University of Cincinnati Clermont College or UC Clermont, a regional campus of the University of Cincinnati
- Collège de Clermont, original name of what is now the Lycée Louis-le-Grand, a secondary school in Paris
- Clermont (1786 ship), an American merchant ship

== See also ==
- Clermont Academy, a historic school building in Clermont, New York, on the National Register of Historic Places
- Places in France:
  - Clermont-Créans, in the Sarthe département
  - Clermont-de-Beauregard, in the Dordogne département
  - Clermont-Dessous, in the Lot-et-Garonne département
  - Clermont-d'Excideuil, in the Dordogne département
  - Clermont-en-Argonne, in the Meuse département
  - Clermont-Ferrand, préfecture of the Puy-de-Dôme département, in the Auvergne région
  - Clermont-le-Fort, in the Haute-Garonne département
  - Clermont-les-Fermes, in the Aisne département
  - Clermont-l'Hérault, in the Hérault département
  - Clermont-Pouyguillès, in the Gers département
  - Clermont-Savès, in the Gers département
  - Clermont-Soubiran, in the Lot-et-Garonne département
  - Clermont-sur-Lauquet, in the Aude département
  - Château de Clermont
  - Château de Clermont (Isère), a ruined castle
  - Château de Clermont (Lot), a castle
- ASM Clermont Auvergne, a French rugby union club located in Clermont-Ferrand
- Claremont (disambiguation)
- Clairemont (disambiguation)
- Clairmont (disambiguation)
- Montclair (disambiguation)
- Mont Clare (disambiguation)
