= Claremont Airport =

Claremont Airport may refer to a location:

- Claremont Airport (Maryland), United States, also known as Cecil County Airport
- Claremont Municipal Airport, New Hampshire, United States
- Claremont Airbase, aerial firefighting base near Brukunga in South Australia, Australia

== See also ==
- Claremont (disambiguation)
