= Claremont Hotel =

Claremont Hotel may refer to:

- Claremont Hotel & Spa, in Oakland, California and Berkeley, California
- Claremont Hotel (Southwest Harbor, Maine), listed on the NRHP in Maine
- Claremont Hotel (Eastbourne), UK

== See also ==
- Clairemont (disambiguation)
- Clairmont (disambiguation)
- Claremont (disambiguation)
- Clermont (disambiguation)
