= Claremont College =

Claremont College may refer to:

- Claremont Colleges, a consortium of seven schools located in Claremont, California, United States, which currently includes:
  - Claremont McKenna College, known as Claremont Men's College from 1946 to 1981
  - Claremont Graduate University, a private, all-graduate research university
- Claremont College (Tasmania), a secondary school in Hobart, Tasmania, Australia

== See also ==
- Claremont Institute, a conservative think tank in Claremont, California
- Claremont (disambiguation)
