= Claremont High School =

Claremont High School may refer to:

- Claremont High School (California), in Claremont, California
- Claremont High School Historic District, listed on the National Register of Historic Places in Catawba County, North Carolina
- Claremont High School (Cape Town), South Africa
- Claremont High School (Tasmania), Australia
- Claremont High School, Kenton, London, England
- Claremont High School, East Kilbride, South Lanarkshire, Scotland

== See also ==
- Claremont Secondary School, Saanich, British Columbia, Canada, a high school
- Clairemont High School
- Claremont School (disambiguation)
- Claremont (disambiguation)
