= Saint-Geoire-en-Valdaine =

- Commune
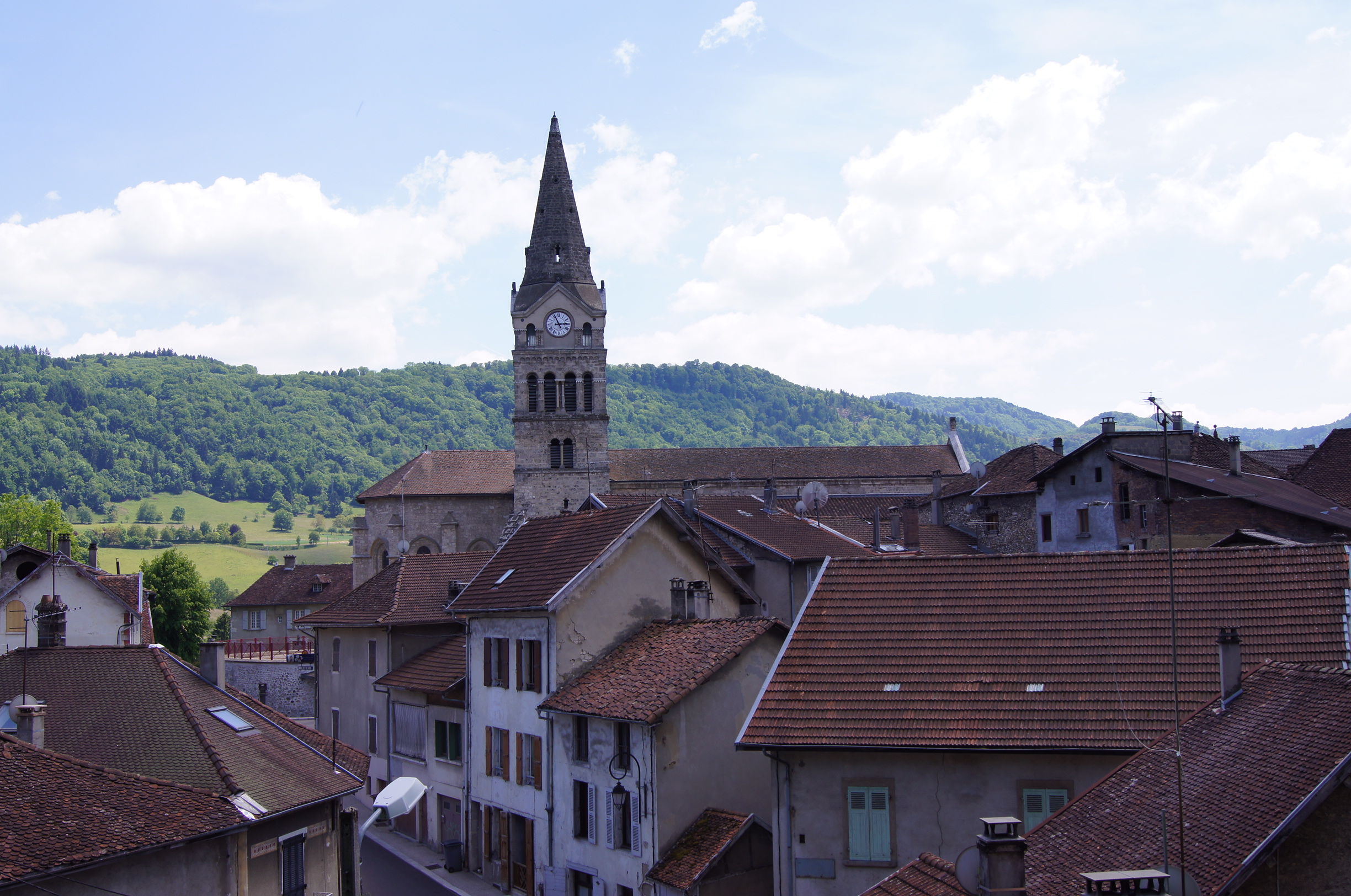
- The church and surroundings

- Coat of arms
- Location of Saint-Geoire-en-Valdaine
- Location within France Location within Auvergne-Rhône-Alpes
- Coordinates: 45°27′27″N 5°38′08″E
- Country: France
- Region: Auvergne-Rhône-Alpes
- Department: Isère
- Arrondissement: La Tour-du-Pin
- Canton: Chartreuse-Guiers
- Intercommunality: CA Pays Voironnais

Government
  - Mayor (2020–2026): Nathalie Chollat-Rat
- Area^{1}: 16.73 km^{2} (6.46 sq mi)
- Elevation: 450 m (1,480 ft)
- Highest elevation: 739 m (2,425 ft)
- Lowest elevation: 364 m (1,194 ft)
- Population (2023): 2,392
  - Density: 143.0/km^{2} (370.3/sq mi)
- Time zone: UTC+01:00 (CET)
  - Summer (DST): UTC+02:00 (CEST)
- INSEE/Postal code: 38386 /38620
- ^{1} French Land Register data, which excludes lakes, ponds, glaciers > 1 km^{2} (0.386 sq mi or 247 acres) and river estuaries.

Saint-Geoire-en-Valdaine is a commune in the Isère department in southeastern France.

The village is known for its charm and picturesque beauty. There are no less than seven castles (chateaux or maison fortes) in and around the village, set among typical Dauphinois style buildings and ancient roadways, testifying to its role in religious and political history over the centuries. Both the 12th century Saint Georges Church in the town center and Chateau de Longpra just outside are national monuments.

The town hall near the center is itself a castle and was for a long time a Benedictine Abbey. The original coat of arms for the village included a Papal crown, making reference to the armed support of the local Count of Clermont-Tonnerre for a twelfth-century Pope. The accompanying motto translates as "even if others abandon you, I will not", a reference to Saint Peter. The Chateau of Clermont is close by on high ground near Chirens, predating the castles in the village, although itself now a ruin. A battle took place in 1590 around the town hall, with the Counts of Saint Geoire en Valdaine and nearby Vireu and their retinues resisting a small army of Huguenot attackers. During the Revolution, priests were given sanctuary and mass was held in the Chateau of Longpra.

== Name ==
The name Saint Geoire en Valdaine comes from a combination of Saint George, the "dragon slaying" Christian martyr, and a corruption of Val D'Ainan, that in the Savoyard dialect means valley ("Val") with a small river (the "Ainan").

== Geography ==
The Ainan river leads to a waterfall in the village, once the site of a mill. The river's ecosystem is exceptionally pristine, containing many protected species.

== History ==
The local region has long been inhabited, with ancient settlements at nearby Lake Paladru and a Druid Dolmen at Merlas (Pierre a Mata, the "Mother stone"). Its recent history covers the rivalries and alliances between Dauphine and Savoyard nobles in the feudal period around the historical frontier between France and Italy, the reformation, revolution and second world war. Every year a medieval "renaissance" fair is held in the village.

The famous pilgrimage route of Santiago of Compestala from Geneva across France to Spain passes close by, with walking trails from Les Abrets and along Lake Paladru.

== Population ==
Historical population

Year	Pop.	±% p.a.
1793	3,617	—
1821	4,417	+0.72%
1846	4,437	+0.02%
1872	3,723	−0.67%
1901	2,047	−2.04%
1926	1,714	−0.71%
1946	1,358	−1.16%
1962	1,341	−0.08%
1968	1,333	−0.10%

Year	Pop.	±% p.a.
1975	1,351	+0.19%
1982	1,570	+2.17%
1990	1,819	+1.86%
1999	1,979	+0.94%
2007	2,309	+1.95%
2012	2,393	+0.72%
2017	2,399	+0.05%
2023	2,392	−0.05%

Source: EHESS and INSEE (1968-2023)

== Notable people ==
Notable village residents include Eugénie du Colombier, a noted Dauphiné painter from the early 19th-century; and the Count and Countess Albert de Franclieu. Similarly, John Berger, the English Booker Prize–winning writer, makes his home in nearby Quincy, Haut Savoie, which also figures in his works.

Historically, Guillaume Dode de la Brunerie, General then Marshal of France, and Pierre Argoud, General, were both born in the village.

== The seven castles ==
- Lambertière
- Longpra
- L'Etergne
- Clermont-Tonnerre
- La Rochette
- Cabarot, previously an Ursuline monastery
- Gely Montcla, previously a Benedictine abbey, today the town hall

== Sights ==
- Church of Saint Georges
- Longpra Castle
- Louvat biscuit (cookie) factory
- Chartreuse natural park
- Pierre a Mata
- Lake Paladru
- Lake Aiguebelette
- Val d'Ainan botanical gardens (arboretum)
- Walibi Rhone-Alpes amusement park
- Les Abrets zoo
- Saint Jean d'Avelanne (LFKH) airfield

== See also ==
- Communes of the Isère department
