= Gaspard de Clermont-Tonnerre =

French Marshal

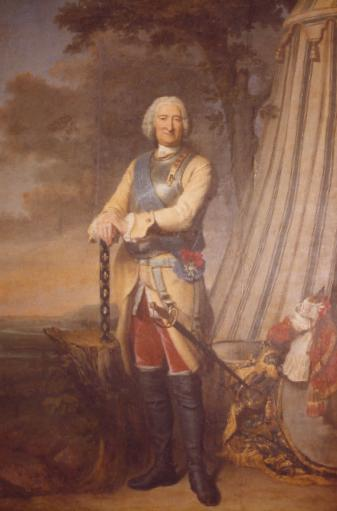
Portrait by Jacques Aved, 1759

Gaspard de Clermont-Tonnerre (16 August 1688 at Dijon – 16 March 1781 at the Hôtel Matignon, Paris), was a French noble, descendant of a family which traced its origins to the 12th century. His chief title was that of Marquis of Cruzy and Vauvillers, later 1st Duc de Clermont-Tonnerre, a new creation which elevated him to the Peerage of France. He was Constable, hereditary Grand-Master of Dauphiné and Marshal of France.

== Biography ==
He fought as a young man in several battles of the War of the Spanish Succession (1701-1714) and was promoted to Brigadier in 1716. He served in the Army of the Rhine during the War of the Polish Succession (1733-1735), which he ended as Lieutenant General.
He then had a successful military career in the armies of Louis XV, notably at the defeat of Cumberland's Anglo-Dutch-Hanoverian forces at the Battle of Fontenoy in 1745 alongside Marshal de Saxe. Clermont-Tonnerre led the decisive cavalry charge which defeated the tenacious but ill-led allied forces. After the Battle of Lauffeld in 1747 he was named Marshal of France.

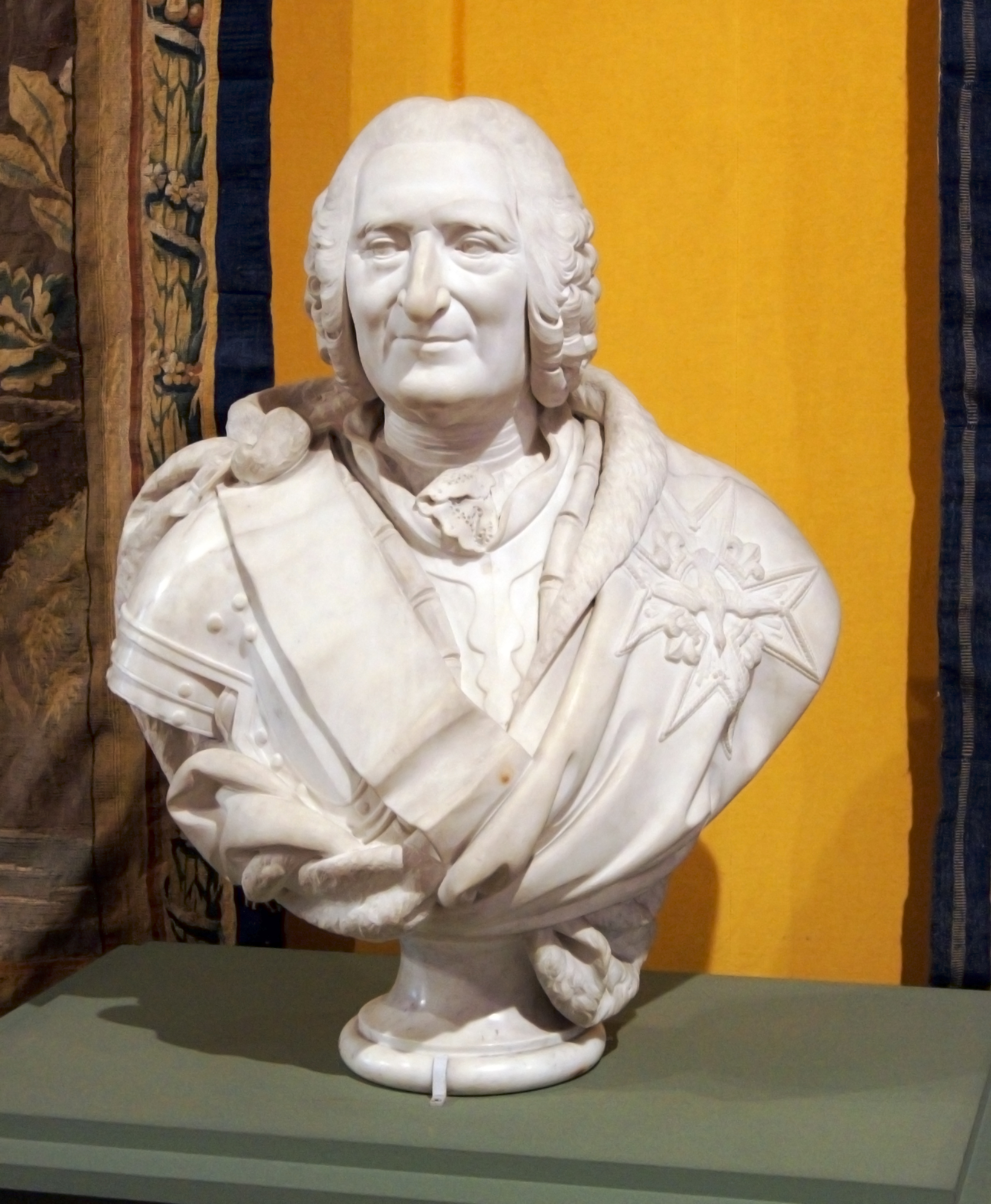
Bust (1767) by Augustin Pajou, marble, Hôtel-Dieu de Beaune

In 1718 he had married Antoinette de Saint-Germain Novion (1685-1754). They had four children:

- Jules Charles Henri, (1720-1794), 2nd Duc de Clermont-Tonnerre, guillotined.
- Madeleine-Louise Jeanne (1722-1769), married François-Louis-Antoine de Bourbon Busset.
- Jean-Louis Aynard (1724-1801), Abbot of Luxeuil.
- François Joseph (1727-1809), Marquis de Clermont-Tonnerre, father of Stanislas de Clermont-Tonnerre.

He remarried in 1756 with Marguerite Pauline de Prondre.

Between 1715 and 1723 the château of Vauvillers was built for him. It was his principal residence between campaigns. In later years he worked to improve the economy of his domain, opening a forge. A new church was built in Vauvillers in 1773 and remains largely unchanged today.

He was made a Chevalier of the Order of Saint Louis in 1717 and admitted to the Order of the Holy Spirit in 1724. At the coronation of Louis XVI in 1775, by then aged 87 and the senior living Marshal of France, Clermont-Tonnerre, served as the sword-bearer. It was on this occasion that he was named Duc de Clermont-Tonnerre and elevated to the peerage.
