= Claremont station =

Claremont railway station may refer to:

- Claremont station (California), a Metrolink station in Claremont, California
- Claremont station (New Hampshire), an Amtrak station in Claremont, New Hampshire
- Claremont railway station (Cape Town) in Claremont, Cape Town, South Africa
- Claremont railway station, Perth in Claremont, Perth, Western Australia, Australia

== See also ==
- Claremont (disambiguation)
- Claremont Parkway (IRT Third Avenue Line), former train station
