= Clermont (surname) =

Clermont or de Clermont is a surname. Notable people with the surname include:

- Andien de Clermont (died 1783), French painter
- Araminta de Clermont (born 1971), British photographer
- Gaston Clermont (1913–2005), Canadian politician and businessman
- Louis de Clermont, seigneur de Bussy (1549–1579), French noble and military commander
- Maurice Clermont (1944–2022), Canadian politician
- Nicolas Clermont (1942–2001), French film producer
- Paul de Clermont (17th-century), French mathematician and military engineer
- Philippe de Clermont (1831–1921), French organic chemist
- Pierre Clermont (1941–2020), birth name of Pat Patterson, Canadian-American wrestler and producer
- René Clermont (1921–1994), French stage and film actor and playwright
- Shannon and Shannade Clermont (born 1994), twin American models and television personalities

== See also ==
- Abraham of Clermont (died c. 479), founder and abbot of the monastery of St.Cyriacus in Clermont-Ferrand, saint of the Syrian Orthodox Church
- Catherine of Clermont (died 1212/1213), Countess of Clermont-en-Beauvaisis in her own right and Countess of Blois by marriage
- Jean de Clermont (died 1356), Lord of Chantilly and of Beaumont, and Marshal of France
- Isabella of Clermont (c. 1424–1465), Queen of Naples
- Raoul I of Clermont (died 1191), French Count of Clermont-en-Beauvaisis
- Raoul II of Clermont (c. 1245–1302), Seigneur of Nesle in Picardy, Viscount of Châteaudun, Grand Chamberlain of France and Constable of France
- Tristan de Clermont (1380–c. 1432), Count of Copertino
