= Clairmont (surname) =

Clairmont is a surname of French origin. It is ultimately connected to the Latin word clarus, meaning "clear" or "bright." Notable people with the surname include:

- Claire Clairmont (1798–1879), stepsister of writer Mary Shelley
- Corwin Clairmont (born 1946), Native American printmaker and artist
- Frederic F. Clairmont, Canadian economist
- Philip Clairmont (1949–1984), New Zealand artist
- Wayne Clairmont (born 1943), Canadian former professional hockey player
