= Clairemont =

Clairemont may refer to:

- Clairemont, San Diego, California
- Clairemont, Texas
- Clairemont Elementary, a school in Decatur, Georgia
- Clairemont High School, San Diego
- Clairemont Avenue, a portion of U.S. Route 12 in Eau Claire, Wisconsin

== See also ==
- Clairmont (disambiguation)
- Claremont (disambiguation)
- Claremont Hotel (disambiguation)
- Clermont (disambiguation)
