= Guillaume Dode de la Brunerie =

Marshal of France Guillaume Dode de la Brunerie Viscount of Martignac
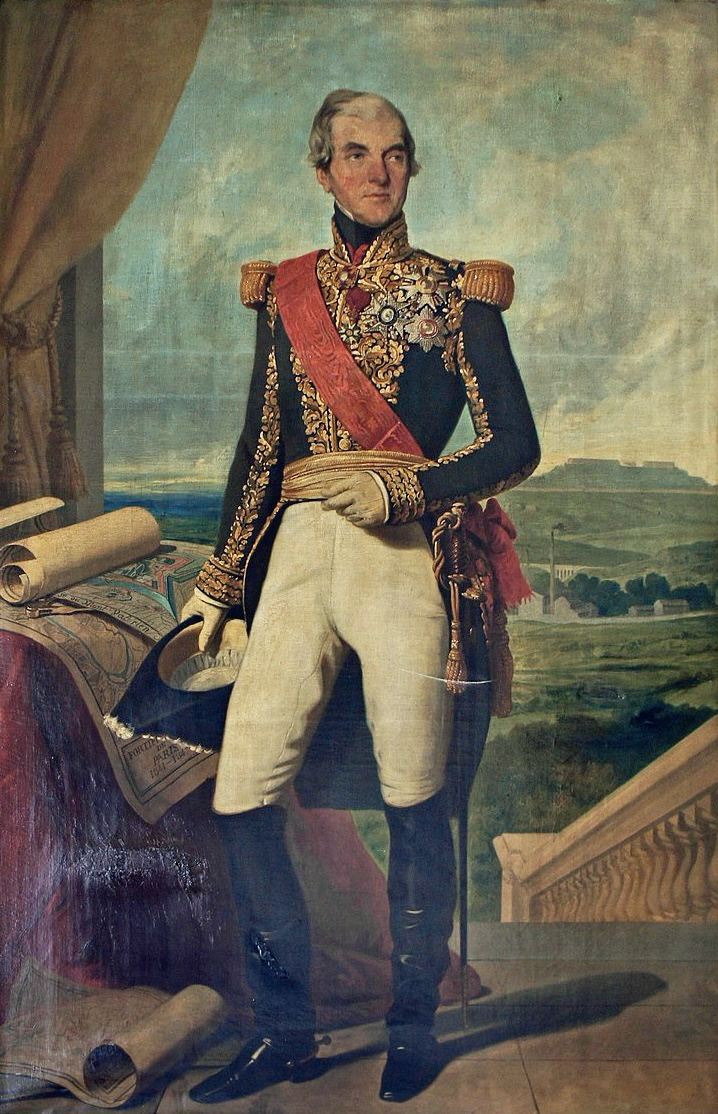
- Portrait by Charles-Philippe Larivière, c. 1841-51
- Born: 30 April 1775; Saint-Geoire-en-Valdaine, France
- Died: 28 February 1851 (aged 75); Paris, France
- Burial place: Père Lachaise Cemetery
- Military career
- Allegiance: First French Republic; First French Empire; Bourbon Restoration; July Monarchy
- Branch: French Army
- Service years: 1793–1848
- Rank: Maréchal de France
- Nickname: Vauban of Modern Times
- Commands: Commandant of Engineers; Inspector-general of Engineers
- Wars: War of the Second Coalition; Egyptian Campaign; Napoleonic Wars; War of the Third Coalition; War of the Fourth Coalition; Peninsular War; French invasion of Russia; Hundred Days; Spanish Expedition

Guillaume Dode de la Brunerie, Viscount of Martignac (April 30, 1775 – February 28, 1851) was a French soldier who rose to the rank of Marshal of France in the Napoleonic Wars.

== Early life and French revolutionary wars ==
Guillaume Dode was born in Saint-Geoire-en-Valdaine in the department of the Isère. As son of a notary, Dode was sent to the lyceum in Grenoble. Soon after the ending of his studies in 1793, he was conscripted in the French revolutionary army as a private. In March 1794, Dode was promoted to lieutenant and sent to the Military School of Engineers in Metz. By December, Dode left the school for a posting in the Army of the Rhine. By August 1795, Dode was promoted to captain. In 1796, Dode was employed at Landau, Kaiserslautern and Zweibrücken for the fortification of these towns. The same year he assisted in preparing the Rhine crossing at Kehl for Moreau's army. By January 1797, one of the bridgeheads created by Dode was under Austrian siege that lasted 200 days and Dode participated in the defense of the bridgehead until the Austrian's were forced to retire.

In January 1798, Dode joined the Army of England. However, this army was ultimately not used to invade the British isles but was sent to the Orient, where under Napoléon Bonaparte it invaded Egypt. In Egypt he was employed in fortifying Gizeh, Cairo and Alexandria. Promoted to major in 1801, Dode stayed in Egypt until the French forces there capitulated, only returning to France in November 1801. In 1802 and 1803, Dode was employed in fortifying the Channel coast near Cape Gris-Nez.

== Napoleonic Wars ==
During the campaign of 1805, Dode joined the Grande Armée and was employed in Marshal Lannes' V Corps. Dode was with Lannes and Joachim Murat when they famously captured a bridge over the Danube by bluffing the Austrian commander Auersperg into believing a ceasefire had been signed. The French then rushed the bridge and captured it before the Austrians could blow it up. Dode did not participate directly in the Battle of Austerlitz as he was posted in the rear of the army as a support.

In December, Dode was promoted to colonel and attached as head of the engineers to Marshal Lefebvre's Corps. However, for the campaign of 1806, Dode was again made head of the engineers on Lannes' staff, a function which saw his participation in the battles of Saalfeld and Jena. After Jena, Dode was sent to repair a bridge over the Elbe and prepare the crossing of the Oder. Dode then took part in the battles of Pułtusk and Ostrolenka. In 1807 he was attached to the staff of Marshal Mortier and in 1808 he was made a baron. When his uncle died and willed him his estate, "Brunerie", Dode attached it to his own name, from then on being named "Dode de la Brunerie".

In late 1808, Dode de la Brunerie was sent to Spain. He participated in the sieges of Zaragoza and of Badajoz. He was then promoted to général de brigade and made head of the engineer staff of the Army of Spain. Dode de la Brunerie served in battles near Almonacid and Ocana until he was recalled to France. In 1812, Dode de la Brunerie was made head of the engineers in the III Corps under Marshal Ney. He successively fought under Marshals Oudinot, Gouvion Saint-Cyr and Victor in Russia, where he fought at Polotsk and the crossing of the Beresina.

On February 12, 1812, he married Agathe-Virginie, the daughter of Marshal Pérignon.

In 1813 he commanded the engineers in Lauriston's Corps and later the engineers of Augereau's Corps and of Gouvion Saint-Cyr's Corps. When the latter was besieged in Dresden, Dode de la Brunerie was unable to rejoin his corps and was the attached to Victor's Corps. After the defeated army returned to France, he was sent to the Army of Italy under Prince Eugène until the war's end.

== The Restoration ==
Recalled to France upon the accession of the House of Bourbon to the throne of France, he was made a member of the commission responsible for making decisions on request concerning the service records of émigrés. In August, he was promoted to lieutenant-general. When Napoléon returned from Elba, Dode de la Brunerie served as commandant of engineers under the Bourbon army opposing the emperor. Napoleon wanted to confirm him in his positions but Dode de la Brunerie refused to be employed during the Hundred Days as he had given his oath of loyalty to Louis XVIII.

In 1816, Dode de la Brunerie was made one of four Inspector-Generals of the engineers. He served on various committees during the next five years. In 1823 Bourbon France decided to intervene in Spain and Dode de la Brunerie was made commandant of engineers of the French army in Spain. In Spain he served in the siege of Cádiz and at the Battle of Trocadero. In 1825 Dode de la Brunerie was made Viscount of Martignac by letters patent. In 1828 he became a member of the Superior War Council and in 1830 he again was made inspector-general of engineers.

== July monarchy and latter years ==
When the July Revolution broke out and Charles X abdicated, the new king Louis Philippe I retained Dode de la Brunerie in all his functions. In 1837, he was made inspector of the École Polytechnique and in 1840 he became president of the Committee of Fortifications. In 1841 he was put in charge of the building of the fortifications of Paris by the minister of war Soult. The construction of the Parisian fortification took seven years to complete and cost approximately 140 million francs and gave Dode de la Brunerie the nickname of being the Vauban of Modern Times. On September 17, 1847, both Reille and Dode de la Brunerie were made Marshals of France, with Dode being the first engineer so honored since the great Vauban.

When the Revolution of 1848 erupted, Dode de la Brunerie decided to retire to private life. Dode de la Brunerie died February 28, 1851, in Paris. He is buried at Père Lachaise Cemetery. His name is mentioned on the Arc de Triomphe.
