= Frederic F. Clairmont =

Canadian economist

Frederic F. Clairmont was a Canadian economist and essayist specializes in economic history and geopolitics. He was educated in Montreal at McGill University and worked for the United Nations. He died in 2021.

He is the author of the books The Rise & Fall of Economic Liberalism: The Making of the Economic Gulag (1996), Cuba and Venezuela: The Nemeses of Imperialism (2007), Prospects of war and peace (2009), BP: The Unfinished Plunder and Crimes of Anglo-American Imperialism (2010), Venezuela: The Embattled Future (2011) and Globalization, The Purgatory of Delusions: Reflections on Imperial Pathology (2012). He has published several articles in Le Monde diplomatique.
