= Claremont, Johannesburg =

Claremont
- Claremont's location in Gauteng
- Coordinates: 26°10′50″S 27°57′30″E
- Country: South Africa
- Province: Gauteng
- Municipality: City of Johannesburg
- Main Place: Johannesburg

Area
  - Total: 1.07 km^{2} (0.41 sq mi)

Population (2011)
  - Total: 9,183
  - Density: 8,582/km^{2} (22,230/sq mi)

Races
  - White: 28.3%
  - Asian: 0.5%
  - Cape Coloured: 31.7%
  - Black: 39.1%
  - Other: 0.3%

Languages
  - Afrikaans: 47.4%
  - English: 17.1%
  - Tswana: 13.7%
  - Zulu: 5.1%
  - Other: 16.7%

Claremont is a suburb of Johannesburg, South Africa, around 9 km west-northwest of City Hall. Under the old municipal borders, it was one of the westernmost suburbs of the city and bordered Roodepoort.

== Location ==
At its widest, the suburb covers 1.7 km from northwest to southeast, but only 600 m from northeast to southwest. It borders Delarey (formerly Roodepoort) on the northwest, while all the others were once suburbs of Johannesburg: Newlands and Montclare (named after Claremont) on the north, Newclare on the east, Bosmont on the southeast, and Industria North to the southwest.

== History ==
The Johannesburg suburb of Claremont was laid out by H. de V. Steytler in 1896 as part of the 106-ha plot No. 211 of the 1,200-ha Waterval Estate. In 1906, the area was purchased by the African Land and Investment Company, and in 1944 it was annexed by the Johannesburg City Council.

== Demographics ==
Claremont was never very large in the early years, with only 64 Afrikaans-speakers and 22 English-speakers in 1934, which rose to 97:19 in 1949 and 127:58 in 1961. Perhaps because of the inclusion of Newlands across the southbound highway, the Claremont Reformed Church was founded as part of the Dutch Reformed Church in South Africa (NGK), though population shrinkage led to this being absorbed in 2011 by the Waterval Reformed Church (NGK) in Newlands. Laerskool Claremont, on Charles Street, still operates as a parallel-medium (English and Afrikaans) school.

== See also ==
- Roodepoort
- History of Johannesburg
- Suburbs of Johannesburg

== Sources ==
- Potgieter D.J. (ed.) (1971). Standard Encyclopaedia of Southern Africa. Cape Town: Nasionale Opvoedkundige Uitgewery Bpk.
- Stals, Prof. Dr. E.L.P (ed.) (1978). Afrikaners in die Goudstad, vol. 1: 1886 - 1924. Cape Town/Pretoria: HAUM.
