= Claremont (surname) =

Claremont is a surname, and may refer to:

- Chris Claremont (born 1950), American comic book writer and novelist
- Edward Stopford Claremont (1819–1890), British Army general who was the UK's first military attaché
- Irene Claremont de Castillejo (1885–1967), British-Spanish Jungian analyst and writer
- Lewis de Claremont (fl.1930s), pseudonym of American author on occultism
- Richard Claremont (born 1965), Australian painter
- William Claremont (died 1832), British stage actor
