= Chirens =

- Commune
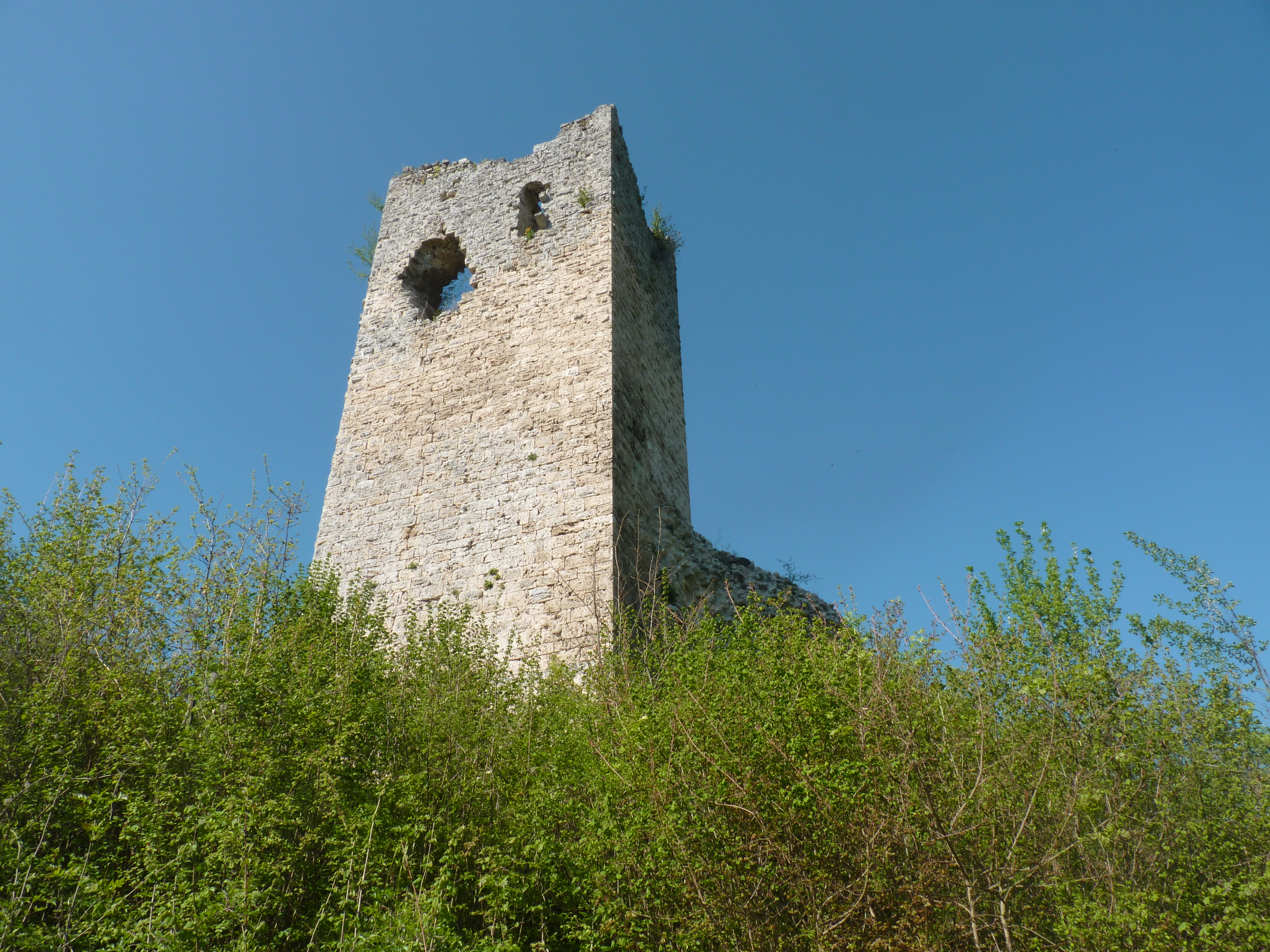
- The tower of Clermont
- Location of Chirens
- Location within France Location within Auvergne-Rhône-Alpes
- Coordinates: 45°24′50″N 5°33′21″E
- Country: France
- Region: Auvergne-Rhône-Alpes
- Department: Isère
- Arrondissement: Grenoble
- Canton: Le Grand-Lemps
- Intercommunality: CA Pays Voironnais

Government
  - Mayor (2020–2026): Christine Guttin
- Area^{1}: 17.53 km^{2} (6.77 sq mi)
- Highest elevation: 876 m (2,874 ft)
- Lowest elevation: 441 m (1,447 ft)
- Population (2019): 2,370
  - Density: 135/km^{2} (350/sq mi)
- Time zone: UTC+01:00 (CET)
  - Summer (DST): UTC+02:00 (CEST)
- INSEE/Postal code: 38105 /38850
- ^{1} French Land Register data, which excludes lakes, ponds, glaciers > 1 km^{2} (0.386 sq mi or 247 acres) and river estuaries.

Chirens (French pronunciation: [ʃiʁɛ̃s]) is a commune in the Isère département in southeastern France.

Above the hamlet of Clermont stands the Tour de Clermont, the only remains of the former castle of the Counts of Clermont-Tonnerre.

== Population ==
Historical population

Year	Pop.	±% p.a.
1793	1,510	—
1800	1,653	+1.30%
1806	2,018	+3.38%
1821	1,939	−0.27%
1831	2,009	+0.36%
1836	2,031	+0.22%
1841	2,022	−0.09%
1846	1,939	−0.83%
1851	1,826	−1.19%
1856	1,740	−0.96%
1861	1,711	−0.34%
1866	1,677	−0.40%
1872	1,665	−0.12%
1876	1,629	−0.54%
1881	1,550	−0.99%
1886	1,334	−2.96%
1891	1,205	−2.01%
1896	1,130	−1.28%
1901	1,085	−0.81%

Year	Pop.	±% p.a.
1906	1,106	+0.38%
1911	1,078	−0.51%
1921	978	−0.97%
1926	978	+0.00%
1931	889	−1.89%
1936	845	−1.01%
1946	823	−0.26%
1954	805	−0.28%
1962	801	−0.06%
1968	764	−0.79%
1975	1,002	+3.95%
1982	1,463	+5.56%
1990	1,806	+2.67%
1999	1,889	+0.50%
2007	1,966	+0.50%
2012	2,340	+3.54%
2017	2,337	−0.03%
2023	2,546	+1.44%

Source: EHESS and INSEE (1968-2023)

== See also ==
- Communes of the Isère department
