= Clairmont, U.S. Virgin Islands =

Coordinates: 17°46′31″N 64°46′47″W

Clairmont, United States Virgin Islands
- Village
- Interactive map of Clairmont, United States Virgin Islands
- Country: United States Virgin Islands
- Island: Saint Croix
- Time zone: UTC-4 (AST)

Clairmont is a settlement on the island of Saint Croix in the United States Virgin Islands.
