= Battle of Lauffeld =

1747 battle of the War of the Austrian Succession

Coordinates: 50°49′43″N 5°37′06″E

- Part of War of the Austrian Succession
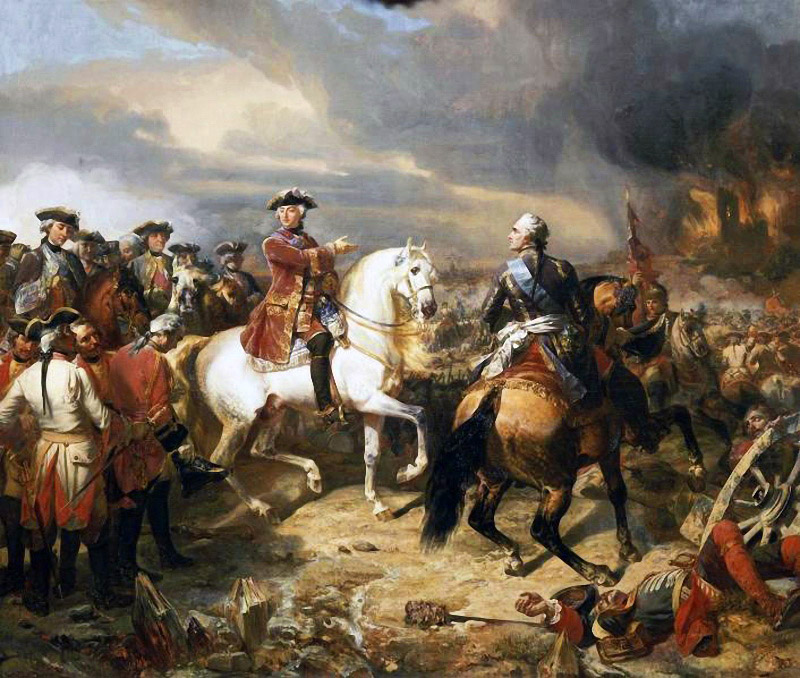
- The Battle of Lauffeld; Auguste Couder, 1836
Date	2 July 1747
Location	Lafelt, Limburg, between Tongeren and Maastricht.
Result	French victory

Belligerents
Great Britain; Dutch Republic (Holy Roman Empire) Habsburg monarchy (Province of Hanover) Hanover	France

Commanders and leaders
(Kingdom of Great Britain) Duke of Cumberland (Kingdom of Great Britain) John Ligonier (Dutch Republic) Prince Waldeck (Holy Roman Empire) Karl Josef Batthyány (Holy Roman Empire) von Daun; Frederick II	(Kingdom of France) Maurice de Saxe (Kingdom of France) Louis XV (Kingdom of France) Clermont-Tonnerre (Kingdom of France) Count Löwendahl

Strength
80,000 up to 170 guns	90,000 to 100,000; 200 guns

Casualties and losses
6,000 (excluding prisoners) to 11,000 casualties 23 guns	c. 5,000 to 11,000 casualties

The Battle of Lauffeld (Note: Also known as Lafelt, Laffeld, Lawfeld, Lawfeldt, Maastricht, or Val) took place on 2 July 1747, during the War of the Austrian Succession. Fought between the towns of Tongeren in modern Belgium, and the Dutch city of Maastricht, a French army of 136,000 under Marshal Saxe defeated a Pragmatic Army of 100,000, led by the Duke of Cumberland.

Arguably the most talented general of his generation, Saxe had conquered much of the Austrian Netherlands between 1744 and 1746. In early 1747, Cumberland planned an offensive to retake Antwerp, but was forced to fall back when the French threatened to cut him off from his supply base at Maastricht. When the two armies met at Lauffeld, a series of mistakes by Cumberland compromised his position, and only counterattacks by the Allied cavalry under Sir John Ligonier prevented a serious defeat.

Initially, Cumberland had order Lauffeldt to be burnt, with the British troops forming a battle line behind the village. However, Ligonier persuaded the Duke to reoccupy the burnt ruins and turn it in to a strongpoint. During a second cavalry charge, made to save the Allied army from destruction by the victorious French, Sir John was captured. He was later presented to the French Monarch by General de Saxe as "the gentleman who ruined my plans". From that point onward, the Duke of Cumberland was very jealous of Ligonier’s military expertise and his reputation.

The battle ended Allied hopes of regaining lost ground and the French captured Bergen op Zoom in September, then Maastricht in May 1748. However, by then France was close to bankruptcy, while severe food shortages caused by the Royal Navy blockade worsened after defeat at Cape Finisterre in October 1747 and left the French unable to defend their merchant shipping. The stalemate resulted in the October 1748 Treaty of Aix-la-Chapelle.

== Background ==
When the War of the Austrian Succession began in 1740, Britain was focused on the 1739–1748 War of Jenkins' Ear with Spain, fought mostly in the Caribbean. British and Dutch troops in Flanders were initially involved as part of the army of Hanover; France did not formally declare war on Britain until March 1744, while the Dutch Republic was technically neutral until 1747. French victory at Rocoux in October 1746 confirmed their control of the Austrian Netherlands, but failed to force Britain to agree peace terms. France entered the war to reduce the post-1713 expansion in British commercial strength which they viewed as a threat to the European balance of power, but by 1747 British trade was expanding once again while the French economy was being strangled by the Royal Navy blockade.

By the end of 1746, most of the participants sought peace. Maria Theresa had secured her throne and was more interested in rebuilding her army in order to retake Silesia; Austria had only acquired the Austrian Netherlands in 1713 because neither the British nor the Dutch would allow the other to control it and retaining it was not a strategic priority. Neutrality had allowed the Dutch to become the main carriers of French imports and exports and its loss put further strain on both economies, with the Dutch government putting pressure on the British to make peace. Although the British were also incurring high levels of debt, they were far better equipped to finance it.

To keep their Allies fighting, in the January 1747 Hague Convention Britain agreed to fund Austrian and Savoyard forces in Italy, along with an Allied army of 140,000 in Flanders, increasing to 192,000 in 1748. The Duke of Newcastle, who as Secretary of State oversaw foreign policy, felt the Allies were strong enough to improve their bargaining position by recovering the Netherlands, while he also anticipated the collapse of the Bourbon alliance following the death of Philip V in July 1746. Although both assumptions proved incorrect, when Franco-British negotiations began at Breda in August 1746, Newcastle instructed his envoy, Lord Sandwich, to delay.

== Battle ==
The Austrian Netherlands and Southern Dutch Republic; key locations 1747–1748

By taking troops from other areas, Saxe was able to assemble a field army of 120,000 men for the 1747 campaign. The defeat of the Jacobite Rising allowed Cumberland to transfer troops back to Flanders, and prepare an offensive. He hoped to capture Antwerp in February, but bad weather, lack of transport, and war weariness meant the Allies were not ready to take the field until early May. During this delay, Contades captured Fort Liefkenhock, making Antwerp too strong to attack. Simultaneously, Löwendahl seized Sas van Gent, IJzenijke and Eekels, threatening Cumberland's supply lines with Maastricht. The latter inspired an Orangist Coup in Zeeland, which eventually led to William IV being appointed first hereditary Stadtholder of all seven Dutch provinces.

To protect Maastricht, Cumberland sent von Daun to secure Tongeren, then held by Clermont-Tonnerre. The Allied cavalry under Ligonier were ordered to occupy the Tongeren-Maastricht road, which ran along a ridge parallel to the river Meuse. Finding the French already in possession, they halted for the night, with the infantry billeted in the villages of Vlytingen and Lauffeld. As at Rocoux, the Austrians were on the right, holding the villages of Grote and Kleine Spouwen, which are now part of the Belgian town of Bilzen. A steep ravine immediately in front protected them from a direct assault. The centre was held by the Dutch States Army under the Prince Waldeck, while the left wing, placed around the village of Lauffeld, consisted of British, Hanoverian, and Hessian troops.

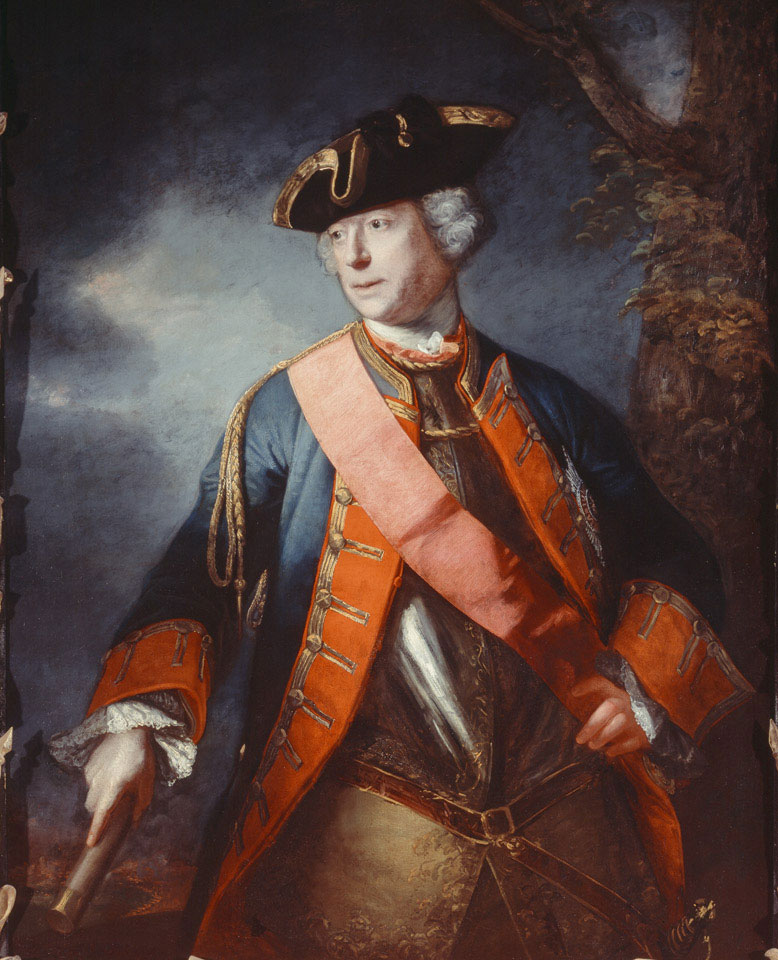
Lord Ligonier, whose cavalry charges allowed the Allies to make an orderly retreat, although he himself was taken prisoner

Most sources suggest around 82,000 French troops faced a slightly smaller Allied army, although estimates vary. The next day was overcast, and heavy rain made movement slow and difficult, so the battle began with an exchange of artillery fire at 6:00 am, which continued until 8:30. Cumberland now made a serious error of judgement, and moved his infantry out of the villages where they had spent the night, having first set them on fire. At Fontenoy in 1745, Saxe used similar positions to inflict heavy casualties on the Allied troops, and Ligonier urged that they be re-occupied. After some hesitation, Cumberland agreed, but the change in orders caused confusion among his subordinates.

Saxe assumed that abandoning the villages meant Cumberland was retreating across the Meuse, and around 10:30 sent his infantry forward to take possession. Although Vlytingen was empty, Lauffeld had been re-occupied by troops under Frederick of Hesse-Kassel. Over the next few hours, the village changed hands four or five times, before the French finally captured it around 12:30 pm. Cumberland ordered a counter-attack but as the infantry formed up, a Dutch cavalry unit to their front was routed by the French and fled, throwing those behind them into disorder and exposing the Allied centre. This was held by the Dutch, who had been limited to two fruitless attacks, both repulsed by French artillery, costing them 537 men. When the Allied left gave way, the centre and right followed.

Meanwhile, 150 squadrons of French cavalry had assembled around Wilre, preparing to attack Cumberland's flank; unaware the Allies were falling back on Maastricht, Ligonier and 60 squadrons charged, taking them by surprise. One of the best known cavalry charges in British military history, Saxe later claimed only this prevented him destroying the Allied army. The French Irish Brigade suffered more than 1,400 casualties; at one point, the short-sighted Cumberland mistook the red-coated Irish for his own troops, and barely escaped being taken prisoner. To cover the retreating infantry, Ligonier obtained permission for another charge, this time with only three regiments. He was taken prisoner, while the Scots Greys, one of the units involved, lost nearly 40% of their strength. This action allowed time for Karl Josef Batthyány and his Austrians to cover the Allied withdrawal.

== Aftermath ==
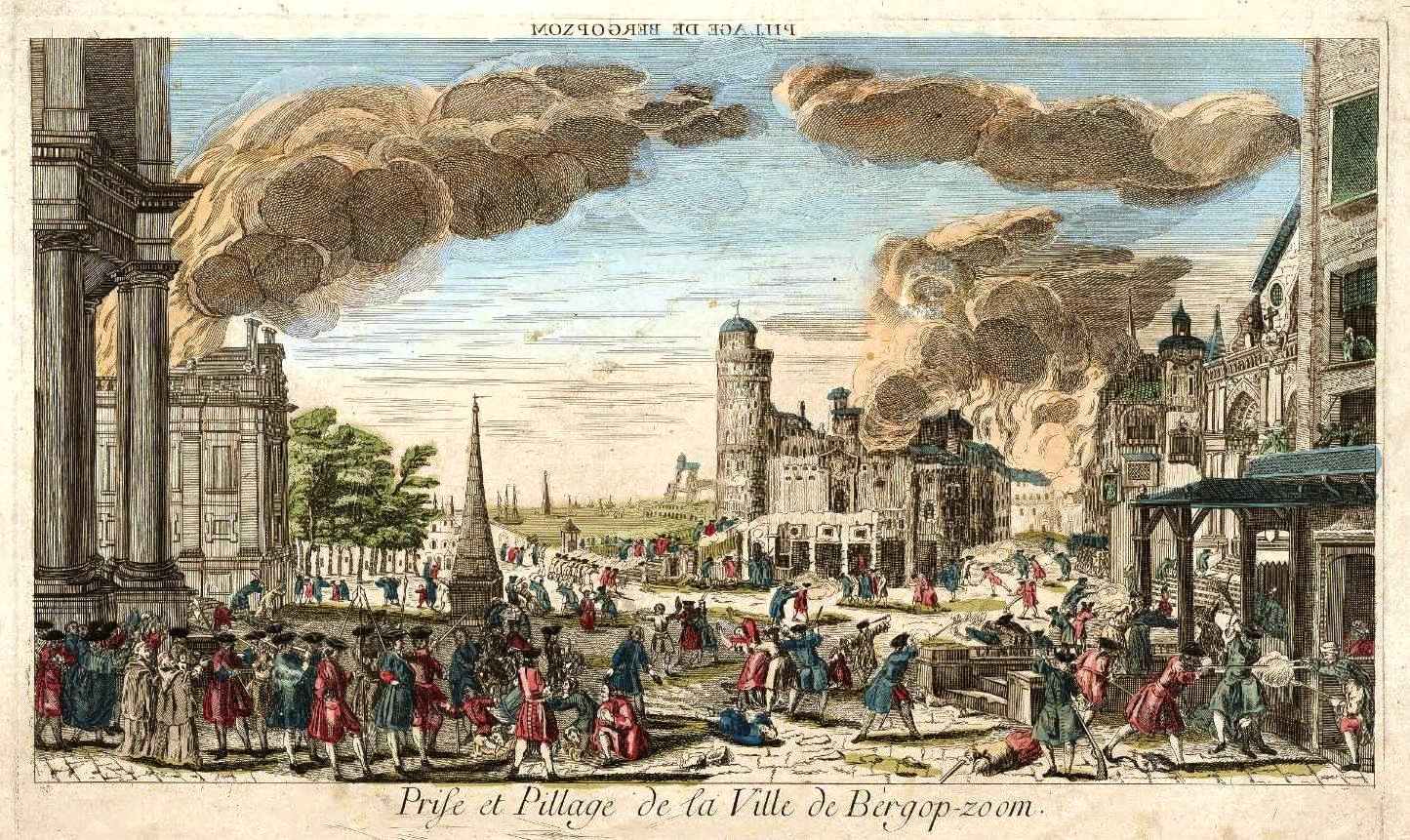
French troops enter Bergen op Zoom September 1747

Estimates of total casualties vary. According to statistician Gaston Bodart, the French sustained 11,000 casualties, consisting of 3,600 killed, 6,400 wounded, and 1,000 captured. French general officers who were killed included Lieutenant General Comte de Bavière, Mestres de camp Comte a'Autichamp and Comte Froulay de Tessé, and Brigadiers Comte Dillon and d'Erlach. Allied casualties also numbered 11,000, comprising 3,000 killed, 6,000 wounded, and 2,000 men captured. Allied losses also included 23 cannons and 9 colors. Historian Reed Browning stated that the French suffered 10,000 casualties while the Allies lost only 5,000.

As on previous occasions, Saxe was unable to follow up his success, leading to accusations from his critics that he was deliberately seeking to prolong the war in order to strengthen his own prestige. Lauffeld was thus another French victory that failed to achieve a decisive result, although it led to the capture of Bergen-op-Zoom in September and Maastricht in May 1748. It provided further proof of Cumberland's weaknesses as a general, all of which had been factors in his earlier defeat at Fontenoy in 1745. These included inadequate reconnaissance, lack of strategic awareness, and poor co-ordination with his senior commanders, as shown by his failure to inform Ligonier he had withdrawn the infantry.

Despite their success in Flanders, the British naval blockade caused a collapse in French customs receipts, and cut them off from the Newfoundland cod fisheries, a key food supply for the poor. Finance Minister Machault repeatedly warned Louis XV of the impending collapse of their financial system. Their position deteriorated further in October 1747 when the Royal Navy attacked a large convoy on its way to the West Indies at Cape Finisterre in October 1747. Despite the loss of their naval escort, most of the merchantmen escaped but warned of their approach, the British Leeward Islands Squadron under Commodore George Pocock was able to intercept many of them in late 1747 and early 1748. As a result of this defeat, the French navy could no longer protect their colonies or trade routes.

In November, Britain and Russia signed a convention for the supply of additional troops and in February 1748, a Russian corps of 37,000 arrived in the Rhineland. However, by now Newcastle was also ready to agree terms, although it has been argued he failed to appreciate the impact of the naval blockade on the French economy. The terms of the Treaty of Aix-la-Chapelle were first agreed by Britain and France at Breda, then presented to their allies. These confirmed Prussian possession of Silesia and minor territorial adjustments in Italy, but essentially returned the situation to 1740, with France withdrawing from the Low Countries. Returning the territorial gains which had cost so much, in exchange for so little, led to the phrase "as stupid as the Peace".

The war confirmed the decline of the Dutch Republic as a major power, while Newcastle later blamed himself for his "ignorance, obstinacy, and credulity", in believing otherwise. Seeking an alternative Continental ally, the British supported the annexation of the Austrian province of Silesia by Prussia, which caused the breakdown of the Anglo-Austrian Alliance, and led to the re-alignment known as the Diplomatic Revolution.

== Sources ==
- Anderson, Fred (2000). Crucible of War: The Seven Years' War and the Fate of Empire in British North America, 1754–1766. Faber and Faber. ISBN 978-0-571-20535-6.
- Anderson, Matthew Smith (1995). The War of the Austrian Succession, 1740-1748. Longman. ISBN 978-0-582-05951-1.
- Black, Jeremy (1999). Britain as a Military Power, 1688-1815. Routledge. ISBN 978-1-85728-772-1.
- Bodart, Gaston (1908). "Militär-historisches Kriegs-Lexikon (1618-1905)" (in German). Wien. p. 211.
- Browning, Reed (1975). The Duke of Newcastle. Yale University. ISBN 9780300017465.
- Browning, Reed (1995). The War of the Austrian Succession. New York, NY: St. Martin's Press. ISBN 0-312-12561-5.
- Carlos, Ann; Neal, Larry; Wandschneider, Kirsten (2006). "The Origins of National Debt: The Financing and Re-financing of the War of the Spanish Succession". International Economic History Association.
- Castex, Jean-Claude (2012). Dictionnaire des batailles franco-anglaises de la Guerre de Succession d'Autriche (in French). Phare-Ouest. ISBN 978-2921668064.
- Davies, Huw (2022). The Wandering Army; The Campaigns that transformed the British way of war. Yale University Press. ISBN 978-0300217162.
- De Périni, Hardÿ (1896). Batailles françaises; Volume VI (in French). Ernest Flammarion, Paris.
- Grant, RG, ed. (2011). 1001 Battles That Changed the Course of History. Universe Publishing. ISBN 978-0789322333.
- Hochedlinger, Michael (2003). Austria's Wars of Emergence, 1683-1797. Routledge. ISBN 978-0582290846.
- Ingrao, Charles (2000). The Habsburg Monarchy, 1618-1815 (New Approaches to European History) (2019 ed.). Cambridge University Press. ISBN 978-1108713337.
- McGarry, Stephen (2013). Irish Brigades Abroad: From the Wild Geese to the Napoleonic Wars. History Press. ISBN 978-1845887995.
- McKay, Derek (1983). The Rise of the Great Powers 1648–1815. Routledge. ISBN 978-0582485549.
- McLynn, Frank (2008). 1759: The Year Britain Became Master of the World. Vintage. ISBN 978-0099526391.
- Morris, Graham. "The Battle of Lauffeld". Battlefield Anomalies.
- Oliphant, John (2015). John Forbes: Scotland, Flanders and the Seven Years' War, 1707–1759. Bloomsbury Academic. ISBN 978-1472511188.
- Rodger, NAM (1993). The Insatiable Earl: A Life of John Montagu, Fourth Earl of Sandwich, 1718-1792. Harper Collins. ISBN 978-0099526391.
- Rodger, N. A. M. (2004). The Command of the Ocean: A Naval History of Britain, 1649–1815. New York and London: W. W. Norton and Company.
- Scott, Hamish (2015). The Birth of a Great Power System, 1740-1815. Routledge. ISBN 978-1138134232.
- Smollett, Tobias (1796). History of England, from the Revolution to the Death of George III: Volume III. T Capel.
- Périni, Hardy (1906). Batailles françaises (6e série). Flammarion. ISBN 978-20-161-3737-6.
- Thompson, Andrew (2012). George II: King and Elector. Yale University Publishing. ISBN 978-0300187779.
- White, Jon Manchip (1962). Marshal of France: The Life and Times of Maurice, Comte de Saxe, 1696-1750 (2012 ed.). Literary Licensing. ISBN 978-1258033590.
- "Battle of Lauffeldt". British Battles.
- Van Lennep, Jacob (1880). De geschiedenis van Nederland, aan het Nederlandsche Volk verteld [The history of the Netherlands, told to the Dutch nation] (in Dutch). Leiden; z.j.
