= Château de Clermont (Isère) =

Castle in Isère, France

Coordinates: 45.4174°N 5.5362°E

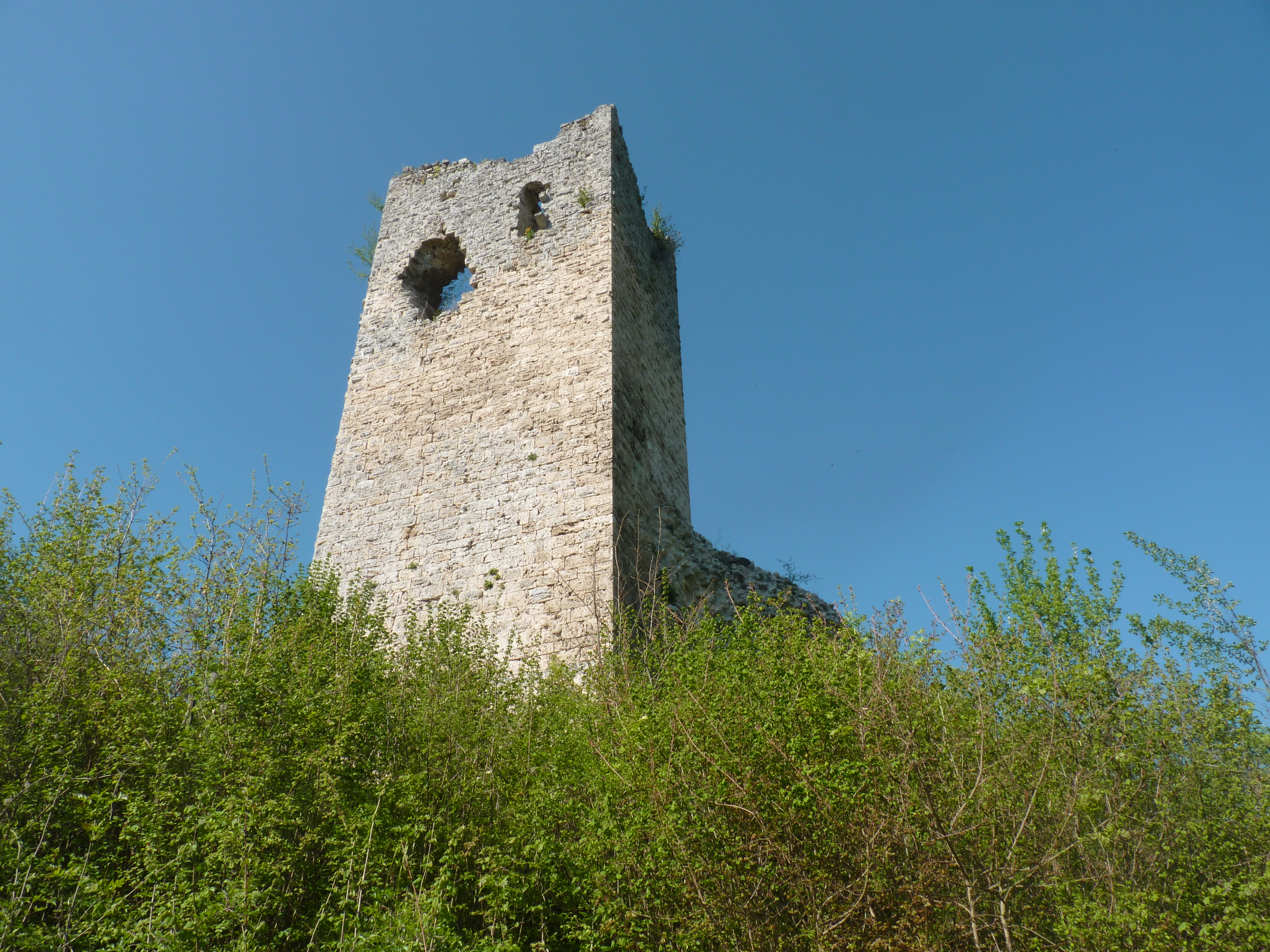
Tour de Clermont

The Château de Clermont (French: [ʃɑto d(ə) klɛʁmɔ̃]; also known locally as the Tour de Clermont) is a ruined 11th-century castle in the commune of Chirens in the Isère department of France.

From the 10th century, Chirens belonged to the Clermont-Tonnerre family. They built a castle on the Clermont hill overlooking the Chirens Valley. The castle was built with a triple enceinte and with an irregular pentagonal keep. The castle seems to have been abandoned at the start of the 16th century and was dismantled in 1626 by royal order inspired by Cardinal Richelieu, along with other castles which no longer served to defend France. Only the keep (which still belongs to the Clermont-Tonnerre family) exists today.

It has been listed since 1983 as a monument historique by the French Ministry of Culture.

== See also ==
- List of castles in France
