= Paul de Clermont =

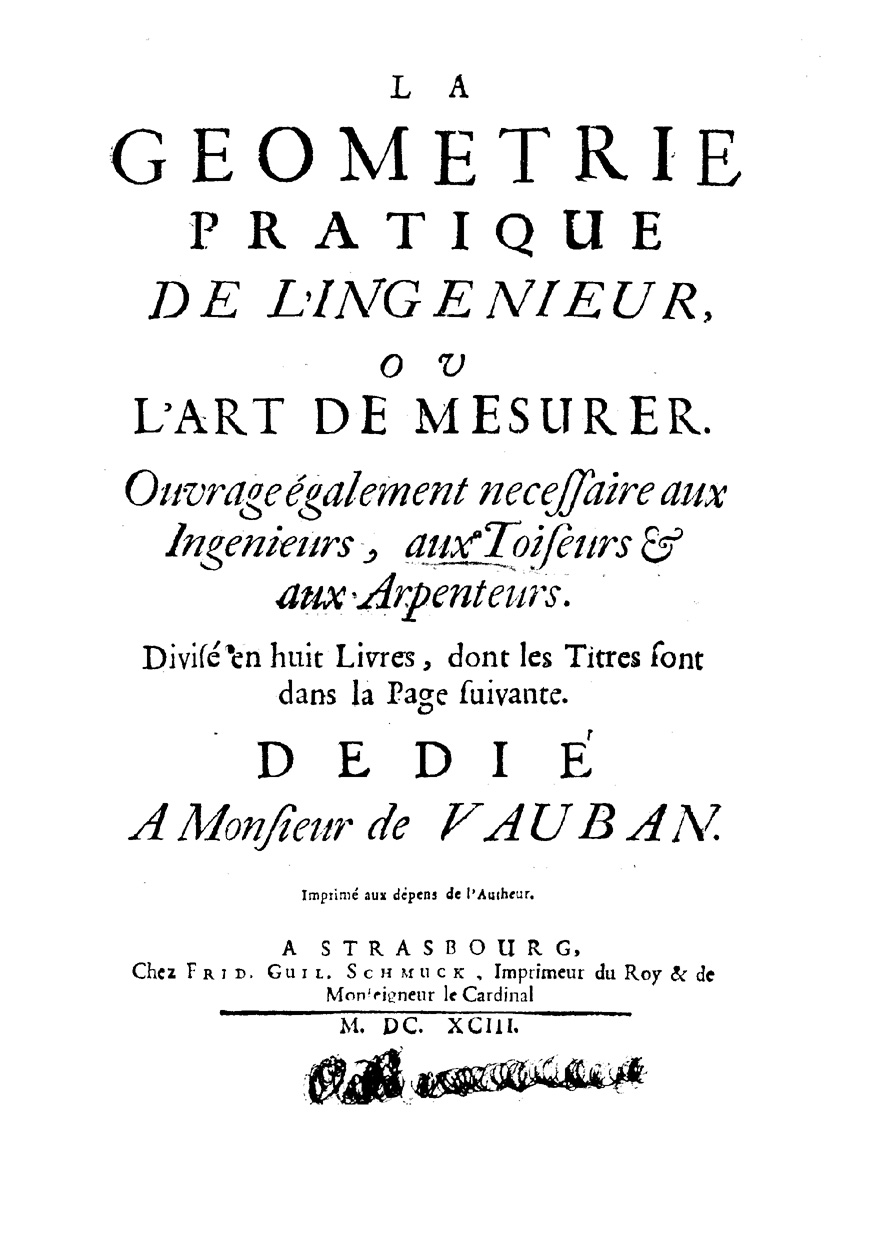
La geometrie pratique de l'ingenieur, ou L'art de mesurer (1693)

Paul de Clermont was a 17th-century French mathematician and military engineer.

His book about practical geometry, La geometrie pratique de l'ingenieur, ou L'art de mesurer (1693), was a reference work reprinted for 60 years.

Clermont served in the French Army as artillery commissary in Strasbourg.

== Works ==
- La geometrie pratique de l'ingenieur, ou L'art de mesurer (in French). Strasbourg: Friedrich Wilhelm Schmuck. 1693.
- L'arithmetique militaire, ou L'arithmetique pratique de l'ingénieur et de l'officier (in French). Paris: Pierre Witte. 1733.
