= Château de Clermont (Lot) =

Castle in Lot, Occitania, France

Coordinates: 44.6768°N 1.3955°E

The Château de Clermont (French: [ʃɑto d(ə) klɛʁmɔ̃]) is a castle in the commune of Concorès in the Lot department of France.

A 13th-century tower contains a chapel. Significant alterations and additions were made in the 16th and 17th centuries. The castle was ruined during the Hundred Years' War and rebuilt at the end of the 15th century or beginning of the 16th. Pillaged and turned into a quarry during the French Revolution, the building has been largely destroyed. Restoration work was carried out in the 19th century (square tower, doorway of the corps de logis). The castle maintains its defensive character. It forms a quadrilateral flanked by four round towers. There is a curtain wall in the north east against which are leant small older buildings. The main corps de logis is opposite while the two other sides were occupied by buildings which are now destroyed. The south east is occupied by stables built after the French Revolution and joined to the main building by a square staircase tower. The towers are lower than originally. 16th-century works are visible in the remains of the principal corps de logis.

Following major structural rebuilding in the early 2000s, the château and barn have been extensively renovated since, including the building of a basin.

The owners have hosted a series of classical music festivals in the grounds since 2007.

The Château de Clermont is privately owned and there is no public access. It has been listed since 1932 as a monument historique by the French Ministry of Culture.

== See also ==
- List of castles in France
