= François de Clermont-Tonnerre =

French aristocrat and cleric (1629-1701)

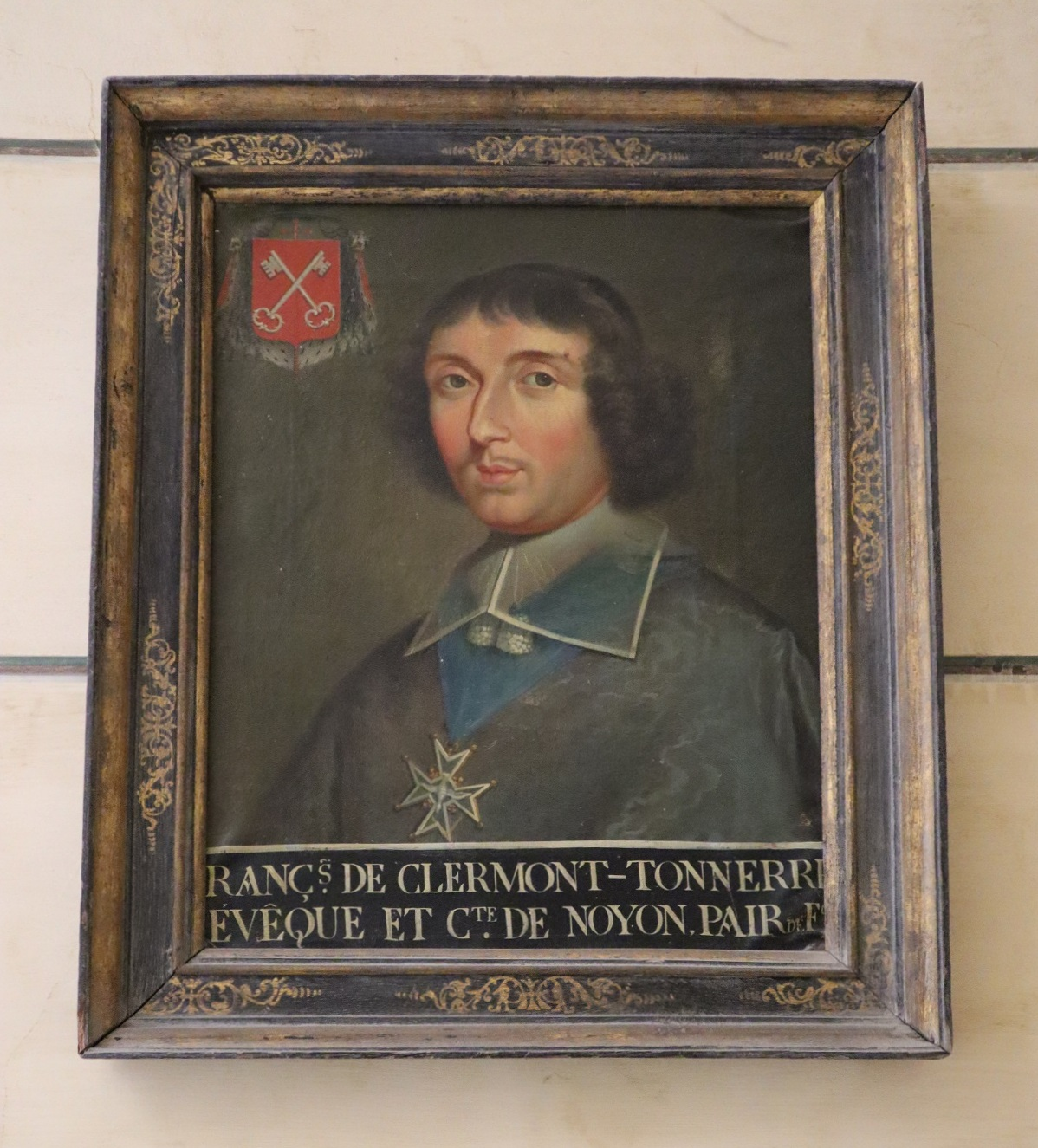
- Born: 1629
- Died: 15 February 1701 (aged 71–72)
- Occupation: Cleric
- Title: Count

François de Clermont-Tonnerre (French pronunciation: [fʁɑ̃swa də klɛʁmɔ̃ tɔnɛʁ]; 1629 – 15 February 1701) was a French aristocrat and cleric. He served as the Count of Noyon, Bishop of Noyon, a pair de France and a member of the Conseil d'État.

== Early life ==
Jean François de Clermont-Tonnerre was born in 1629. He was the younger son of comte François de Clermont-Tonnerre (1601-1679) and Marie Vignier de Saint-Liebaut. He received a doctorate at the Sorbonne after studying under the Jesuits.

== Vocation ==
In 1694, he was appointed to replace Barbier d'Aucour at the Académie française and in 1695 became president of the Assembly of the French clergy. He also wrote some religious works, including a Rule of Saint Benedict (1687). At the time of his death, he was working on a Commentaire mystique et moral sur l'Ancien Testament.

He was summoned to the court of Louis XIV, who wanted to amuse himself with his excessive vanity. Clermont-Tonnerre founded a prize for poetry of 3,000 francs, whose topic was always to be an elegy on Louis XIV and his deeds.

== Death ==
He died on 15 February 1701.
