= Claremont School, Baltimore =

Special-needs middle-high school in Baltimore, Maryland

Claremont School

Location
- 100 Kane Street; Baltimore, Maryland 21224; United States; 39.294907°N 76.53334°W

Information
- School type: Public
- Founded: 1966
- School district: Baltimore City Public Schools
- School number: 307
- Principal: Dr. Theodosia Edwards
- Grades: 6-12
- Enrollment: 58 (2018)
- Campus type: Urban
- Website: City Schools Site

Claremont School, is a public separate middle/high school located in Orangeville, Baltimore, Maryland, United States. The school was founded in 1966 with the purpose of serving the needs of students with intellectual disabilities. The school continues to serve students with disabilities, grades 6-12, offering career & technical training in areas such as food & beverage management.

== History ==
Originally proposed as the Claremont Trainable School, the school was constructed in 1966 as purpose-built facility for training of students with intellectual disabilities, containing only small, special classrooms as well as home economics and industrial arts facilities, without a cafeteria, gymnasium or auditorium. Claremont's building was opposed by the Department of Education and Bureau of Building Construction, who objected to the high cost of the custom facility, 45% higher per square-foot than the bid for City Springs elementary earlier in the year. Nonetheless, the school's building was considered worth the cost by, with City Councilman John A. Pica stating "The need for this kind of facility in Baltimore city is too great to let it be delayed this way," and the Board of Estimates approved the project, which opened later in 1966. In 1969, Claremont was selected as the site of a project using federal funding to pilot a team teaching program to attempt on-the-job training of special education interns who did not have an education degree. The federal funding also permitted supplementary services for Claremont students including taxi and bus service and free lunches to be implemented.

In 2001, as part of a city-wide reorganization plan, Claremont was recommended, along with three other special education centers, for closure by Baltimore City Schools, in a move "intended to maximize efficiency and improve the quality of education." However, due to heavy community opposition, the school board ultimately voted to keep the school open.

In November 2014, as part of the 21st Century Schools project, Baltimore City Schools announced its intention to co-locate Claremont within the neighboring Patterson High School, once the latter's new facilities are built during the (projected) 2019 school year. Under the proposal, Claremont will retain a separate identity and facilities within the larger building with capacity for approximately 120 students. The school will relocate to the new Patterson/Claremont building during the 2022–2023 school year.

== Extracurriculars ==
Claremont has hosted or participated in a number of programs outside of the school since its creation. Students from the school are able to participate in supervised summer jobs to gain experience, money and social connections, via a program funded through the school system. Starting in 1969, the city had hosted an annual Special Olympics (beginning one year after the original), and Claremont School students have been both participants and winners. By the 1980s, the school featured its own Girl Scout Troop, No. 888. Beginning in 1988, students from Claremont volunteered at the Memorial Stadium, handing out and collecting All-Star game ballots on the behalf of the Baltimore Orioles, in exchange for free trips to games there. The work also led to donations that funded programs at the school like assemblies and a school paper. When the Orioles made the transition to Camden Yards in 1992, they informed the Claremont students that they would not have them perform this task anymore. This led to letters of protest from the community, and the reversal of the change a month later. Johns Hopkins University hosts an organization, Best Buddies at JHU, which partners JHU students one-to-one with a student at both Claremont School and the related Baltimore Transition Connection to enjoy activities together including attending sports games, bowling, ice skating and meals.
