= Claremont Airport (Maryland) =

Airport near Elkton, Maryland, US

Cecil County Airport
- IATA: none; ICAO: none; FAA LID: 58M

Summary
- Operator: CJ Flight CLA LLC
- Serves: Elkton, Maryland
- Built: May 1977
- Elevation AMSL: 106 ft / 32 m
- Coordinates: 39°34′27″N 075°52′11″W

Map
- Location of airport in Maryland

Runways
Direction	Length		Surface
Direction	ft	m	Surface
13-31	2,998	914	Asphalt

Claremont Airport, formerly known as Cecil County Airport and Raintree Airpark (ICAO: K58M, FAA LID: 58M), is an airport located 3 miles (5 km) south of Elkton, Maryland, United States.

== History ==
In 2013, the airport was sold for $1.35 million.
