= Claremont Hotel, Eastbourne =

Hotel in East Sussex, England

Coordinates: 50°46′1″N 0°17′30″E

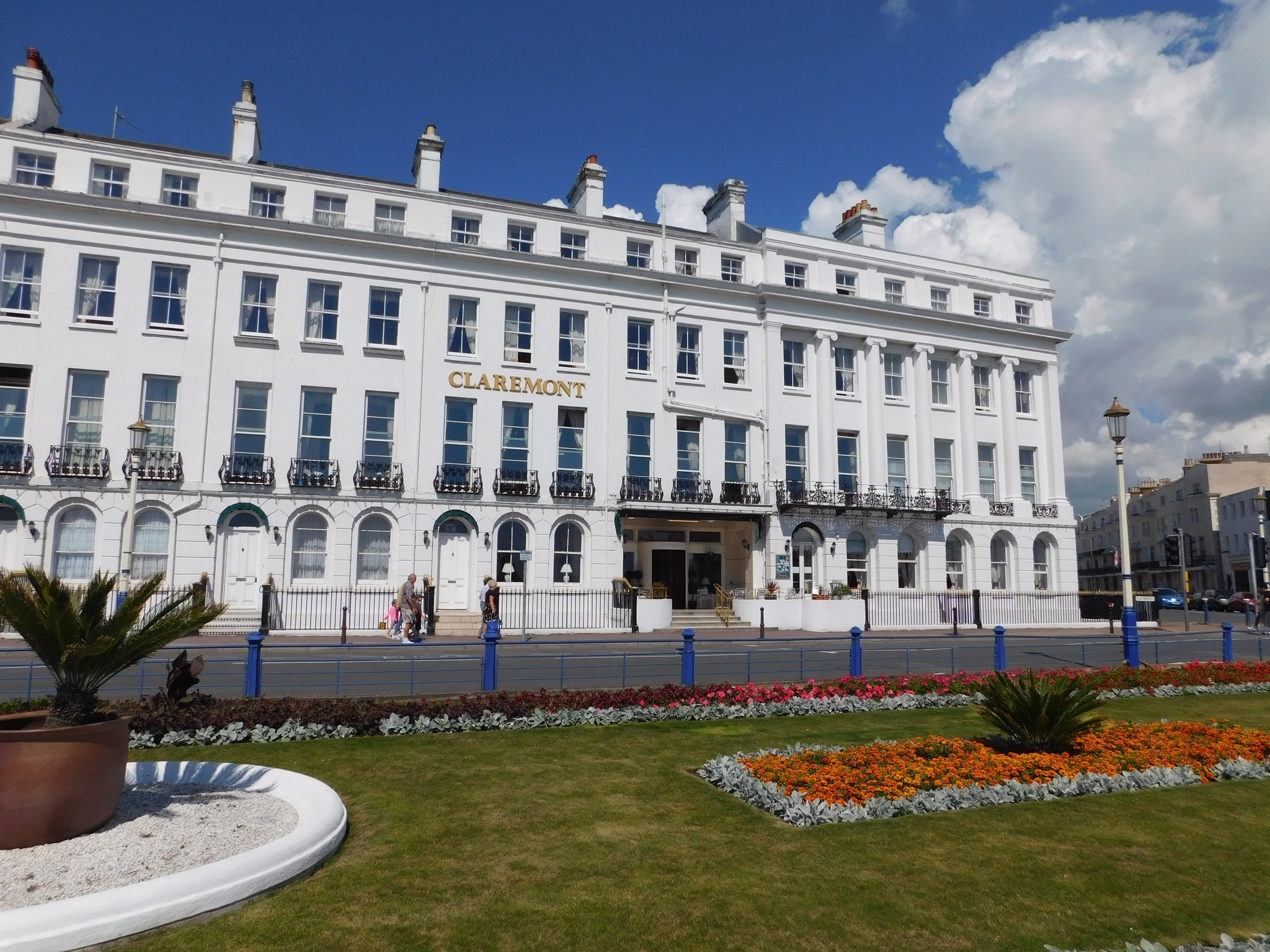
The hotel in 2017

The Claremont Hotel was a hotel in Eastbourne, East Sussex, United Kingdom, overlooking the Carpet Gardens, near Eastbourne Pier. The hotel was destroyed by a large fire on 22 November 2019.

The Grade II* listed 70-room hotel adjoined the 159-room Burlington Hotel to form a grand white-washed row known as the Grand Parade. Both hotels were originally terraced houses, with the Burlington spanning 13 houses.

== History ==
The hotel was built between 1851 and 1855, after some delay in financing after the builders went bankrupt. The hotel was originally named after the 2nd Earl of Burlington, William Cavendish, 7th Duke of Devonshire. The hotel became a listed building in 1949.

In 2007 the long-term manager of the Burlington hotel, Christopher Dean, retired after fifteen years at the hotel. Formerly owned by Sheikh Abid Gulzar, the Claremont was acquired in the mid-2010s by Daish's Holidays.

At 08:50 GMT on 22 November 2019, a fire broke out in the basement of the hotel and resulted in around 60 firefighters and 12 fire engines being sent to the hotel to extinguish the flames. The hotel was successfully evacuated with seven people injured, one being hospitalised; the nearby Pier Hotel was also evacuated. Fire continued to burn until the gas supply was successfully cut off on the evening of 24 November. The hotel was gutted, and the Burlington Hotel also remained closed afterwards.

Hopes of preserving parts of the hotel were abandoned when the remaining facade started to collapse during Storm Ciara in February 2020. The remainder of the hotel was subsequently demolished.

== Architecture ==
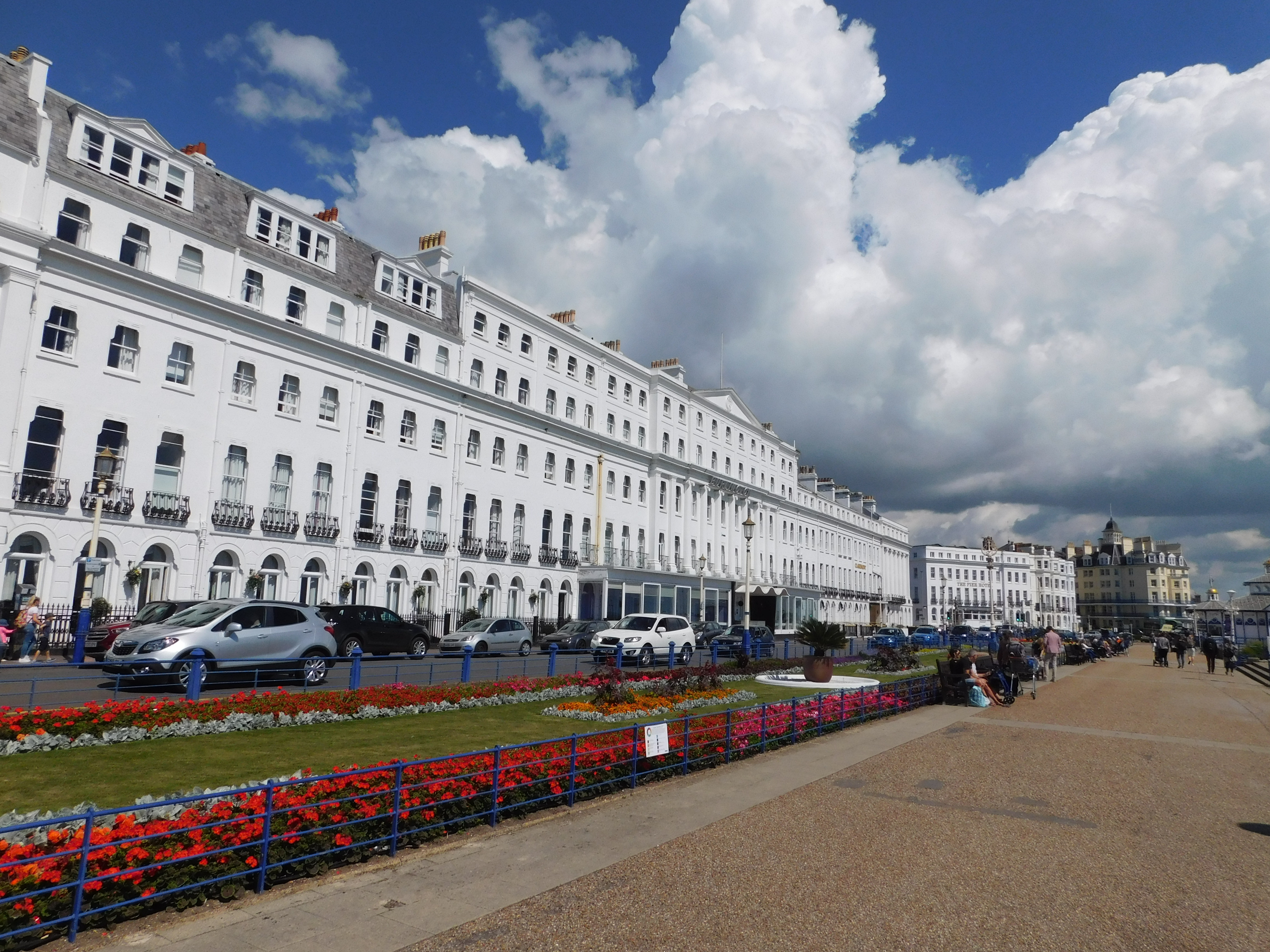
The façade overlooking the Grand Parade in 2017

The hotel was a four-storey building with iron balconies. At No 7 the ground floor of the facade was cut away to provide the entrance to the Claremont Hotel. There was a porch at No.14 with Doric columns. The hotel contained a large conference room which could accommodate up to 150 people.
