= Lilly, Eure =

Lilly
- Commune
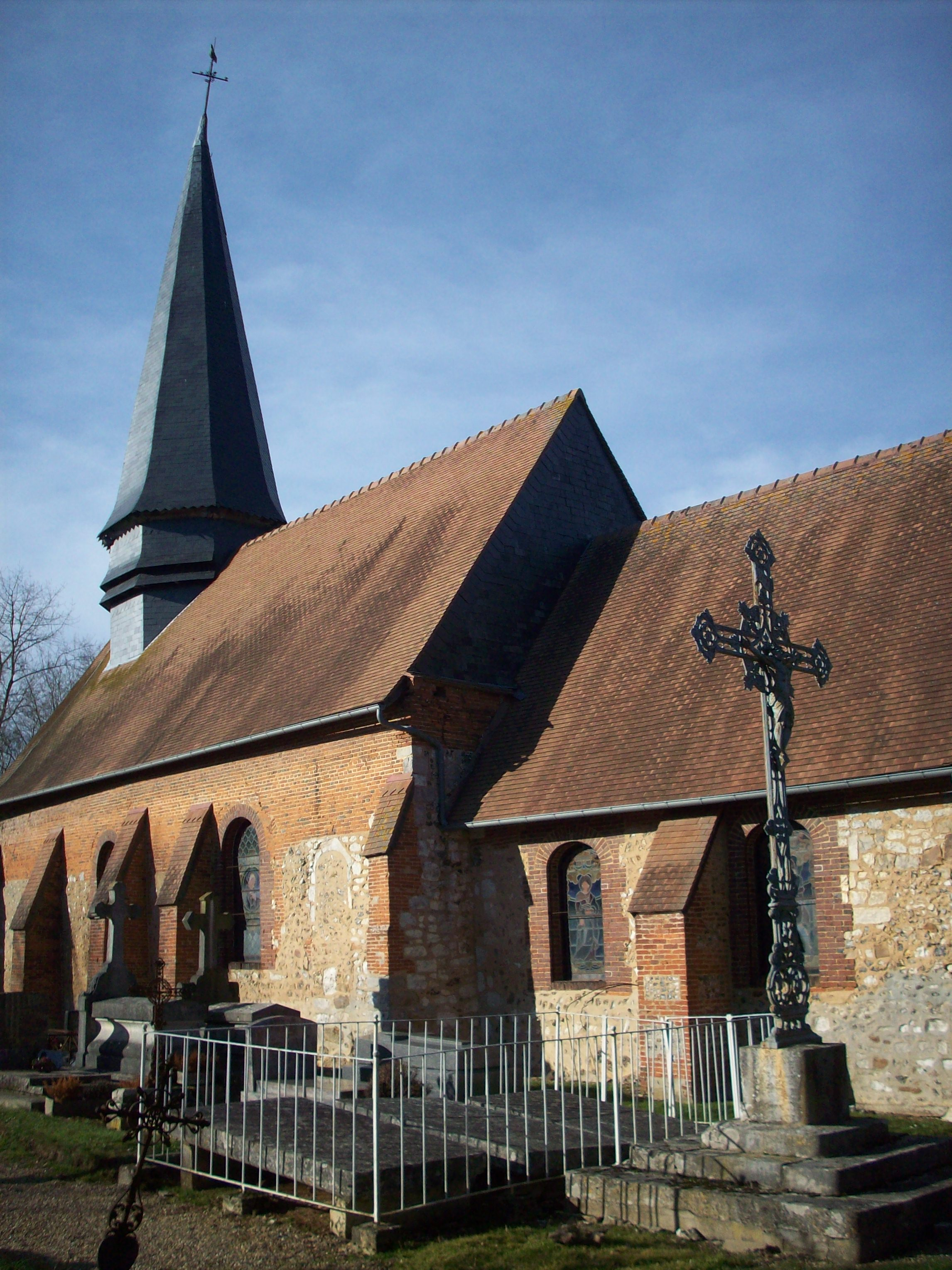
- The church of Saint Peter and Saint Paul in Lilly
- Location of Lilly
- Location within France Location within Normandy
- Coordinates: 49°24′27″N 1°34′04″E
- Country: France
- Region: Normandy
- Department: Eure
- Arrondissement: Les Andelys
- Canton: Romilly-sur-Andelle

Government
  - Mayor (2020–2026): Sidonie Lancien
- Area^{1}: 6.03 km^{2} (2.33 sq mi)
- Elevation: 157 m (515 ft)
- Highest elevation: 162 m (531 ft)
- Lowest elevation: 135 m (443 ft)
- Population (2023): 73
  - Density: 12/km^{2} (31/sq mi)
- Time zone: UTC+01:00 (CET)
  - Summer (DST): UTC+02:00 (CEST)
- INSEE/Postal code: 27369 /27480
- ^{1} French Land Register data, which excludes lakes, ponds, glaciers > 1 km^{2} (0.386 sq mi or 247 acres) and river estuaries.

Lilly is a commune in the Eure department in Normandy in northern France.

== Population ==
Historical population
Year	Pop.	±% p.a.
1968	139	—
1975	117	−2.43%
1982	95	−2.93%
1990	77	−2.59%
1999	74	−0.44%
2007	73	−0.17%
2012	71	−0.55%
2017	84	+3.42%
2023	73	−2.31%
Source: INSEE

== See also ==
- Communes of the Eure department
