= Saint-Pierre-de-Soucy =

- Commune
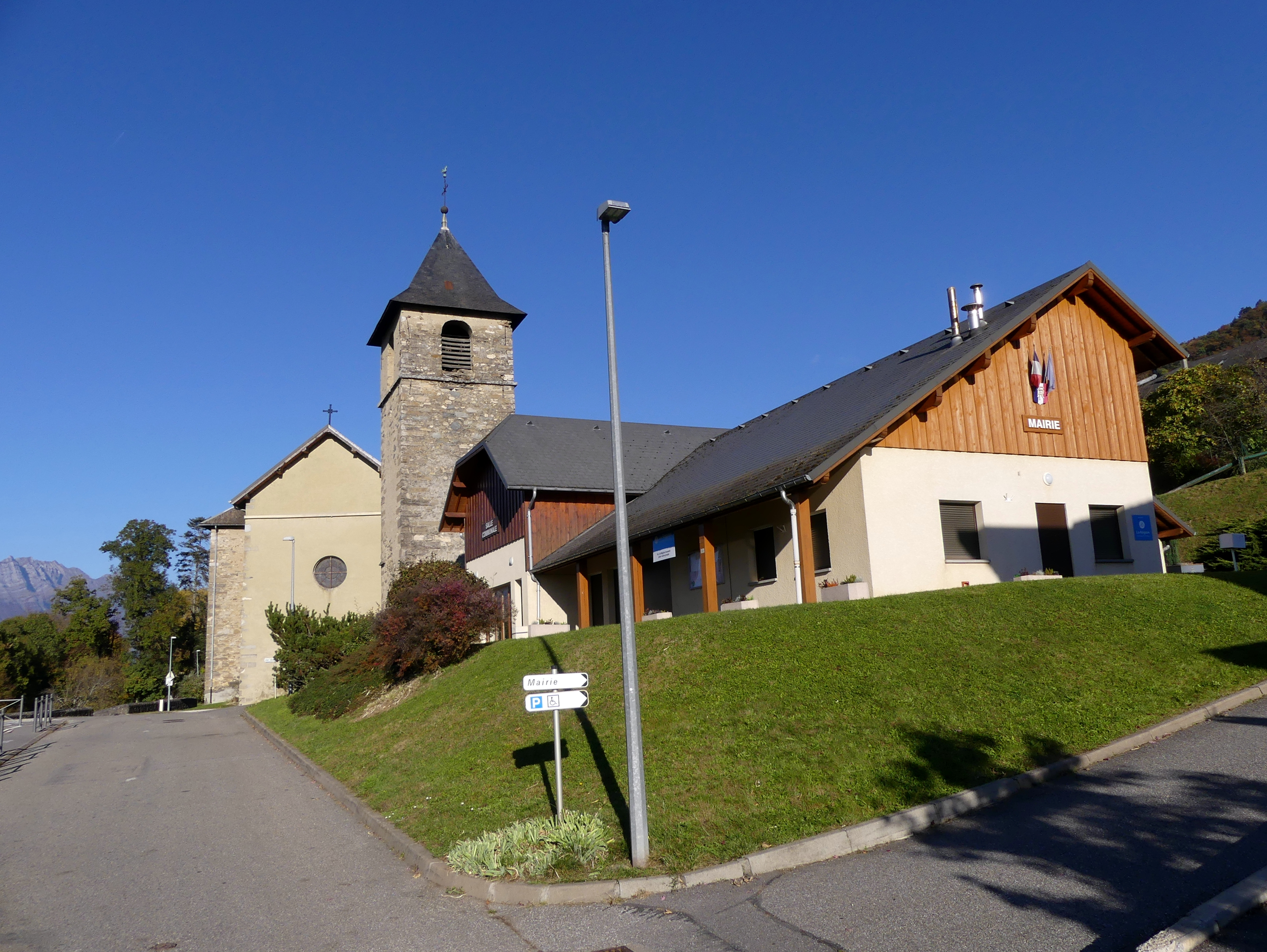
- Location of Saint-Pierre-de-Soucy
- Location within France Location within Auvergne-Rhône-Alpes
- Coordinates: 45°29′41″N 6°06′24″E
- Country: France
- Region: Auvergne-Rhône-Alpes
- Department: Savoie
- Arrondissement: Chambéry
- Canton: Montmélian

Government
  - Mayor (2020–2026): Isabelle Jarriand
- Area^{1}: 9.09 km^{2} (3.51 sq mi)
- Highest elevation: 811 m (2,661 ft)
- Lowest elevation: 256 m (840 ft)
- Population (2023): 437
  - Density: 48.1/km^{2} (125/sq mi)
- Time zone: UTC+01:00 (CET)
  - Summer (DST): UTC+02:00 (CEST)
- INSEE/Postal code: 73276 /73800
- ^{1} French Land Register data, which excludes lakes, ponds, glaciers > 1 km^{2} (0.386 sq mi or 247 acres) and river estuaries.

Saint-Pierre-de-Soucy (French pronunciation: [sɛ̃ pjɛʁ də susi]) is a commune in the Savoie department in the Auvergne-Rhône-Alpes region in south-eastern France.

== Geography ==
=== Climate ===
Saint-Pierre-de-Soucy has an oceanic climate (Köppen climate classification Cfb) closely bordering on a humid subtropical climate (Cfa). The average annual temperature in Saint-Pierre-de-Soucy is 11.5 °C (52.7 °F). The average annual rainfall is 1,122.4 mm (44.19 in) with December as the wettest month. The temperatures are highest on average in July, at around 21.1 °C (70.0 °F), and lowest in January, at around 1.9 °C (35.4 °F). The highest temperature ever recorded in Saint-Pierre-de-Soucy was 41.2 °C (106.2 °F) on 11 August 2003; the coldest temperature ever recorded was −20.7 °C (−5.3 °F) on 7 January 1985.

Climate data for Saint-Pierre-de-Soucy (1991−2020 normals, extremes 1982−2015)
Month	Jan	Feb	Mar	Apr	May	Jun	Jul	Aug	Sep	Oct	Nov	Dec	Year
Record high °C (°F)	16.5 (61.7)	20.6 (69.1)	26.2 (79.2)	30.4 (86.7)	33.6 (92.5)	37.2 (99.0)	39.6 (103.3)	41.2 (106.2)	32.0 (89.6)	29.0 (84.2)	23.0 (73.4)	21.3 (70.3)	41.2 (106.2)
Mean daily maximum °C (°F)	5.5 (41.9)	7.9 (46.2)	13.8 (56.8)	17.6 (63.7)	21.7 (71.1)	25.5 (77.9)	27.7 (81.9)	27.2 (81.0)	22.2 (72.0)	16.9 (62.4)	9.9 (49.8)	5.5 (41.9)	16.8 (62.2)
Daily mean °C (°F)	1.9 (35.4)	3.2 (37.8)	7.9 (46.2)	11.3 (52.3)	15.5 (59.9)	19.2 (66.6)	21.1 (70.0)	20.7 (69.3)	16.6 (61.9)	12.2 (54.0)	6.1 (43.0)	2.3 (36.1)	11.5 (52.7)
Mean daily minimum °C (°F)	−1.8 (28.8)	−1.5 (29.3)	2.1 (35.8)	5.1 (41.2)	9.4 (48.9)	12.8 (55.0)	14.6 (58.3)	14.3 (57.7)	10.9 (51.6)	7.4 (45.3)	2.3 (36.1)	−1.0 (30.2)	6.2 (43.2)
Record low °C (°F)	−20.7 (−5.3)	−15.1 (4.8)	−9.0 (15.8)	−4.6 (23.7)	−0.5 (31.1)	2.2 (36.0)	6.2 (43.2)	4.8 (40.6)	1.0 (33.8)	−3.6 (25.5)	−11.8 (10.8)	−12.2 (10.0)	−20.7 (−5.3)
Average precipitation mm (inches)	97.6 (3.84)	73.2 (2.88)	84.5 (3.33)	80.2 (3.16)	98.1 (3.86)	96.7 (3.81)	95.3 (3.75)	93.8 (3.69)	89.0 (3.50)	95.4 (3.76)	106.7 (4.20)	111.9 (4.41)	1,122.4 (44.19)
Average precipitation days (≥ 1.0 mm)	9.4	8.1	9.0	9.2	11.2	10.1	8.2	8.8	8.1	10.0	10.1	10.8	112.9
Source: Météo-France

== See also ==
- Communes of the Savoie department
