= Claremont, South Carolina =

Settlement in South Carolina, United States

Coordinates: 33°58′26″N 80°33′34″W

Claremont is an unincorporated community in Sumter County, in the U.S. state of South Carolina.

== History ==
According to tradition, Claremont was so named from the views overlooking the elevated town site.
