= Claremont Airbase =

- IATA: none; ICAO: YCLB

Summary
- Airport type: Private
- Owner/Operator: Aerotech
- Location: Brukunga, South Australia
- Opened: December 2016
- Time zone: Australian Central Standard Time (UTC+09:30)
  - Summer (DST): (UTC+10:30)
- Coordinates: 34°59′31″S 138°55′37″E

Map

Claremont Airbase is a private airport near Brukunga in the Adelaide Hills east of Adelaide, South Australia. It is the main base used for aerial firefighting support of the South Australian Country Fire Service.

Claremont Airbase opened in December 2016 to replace a smaller base at Woodside. It is owned and operated by Aerotech.
