= Claremont High School (Cape Town) =

Public high school in Cape Town, South Africa

Location
- Cape Town, Western Cape; South Africa; 33.9879°S 18.4689°E

Information
- Type: Public High School
- Opened: 2011
- School district: Metro Central District
- School number: 021 671 0645
- Principal: Mrs Natalie Niekerk
- Grades: 8–12
- Gender: Boys & Girls
- Age: 14 to 18
- Campus: Urban Campus
- Campus type: Suburban
- Colours: Red; Grey; White
- Accreditation: Western Cape Education Department
- Communities served: Claremont, Cape Town
- Website: www.claremonthigh.co.za

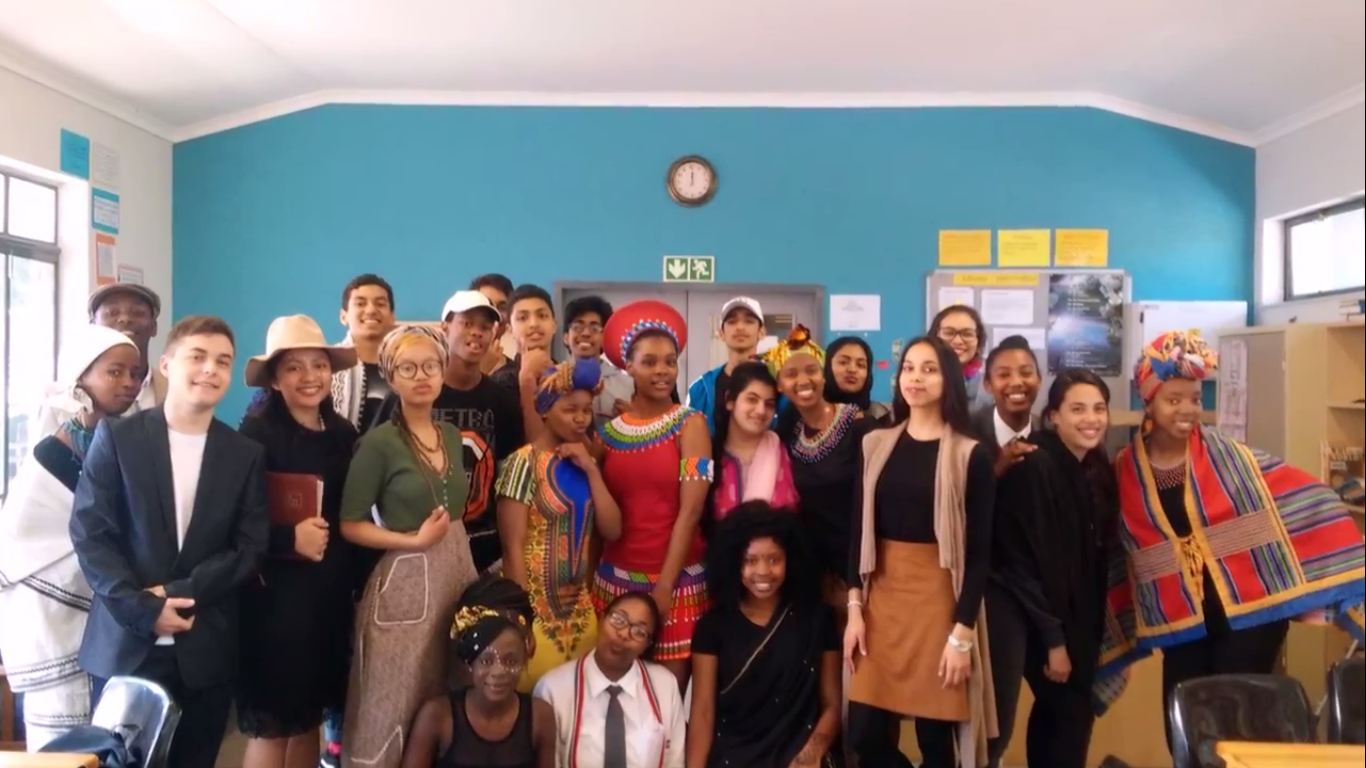
An event celebrating the school's diversity

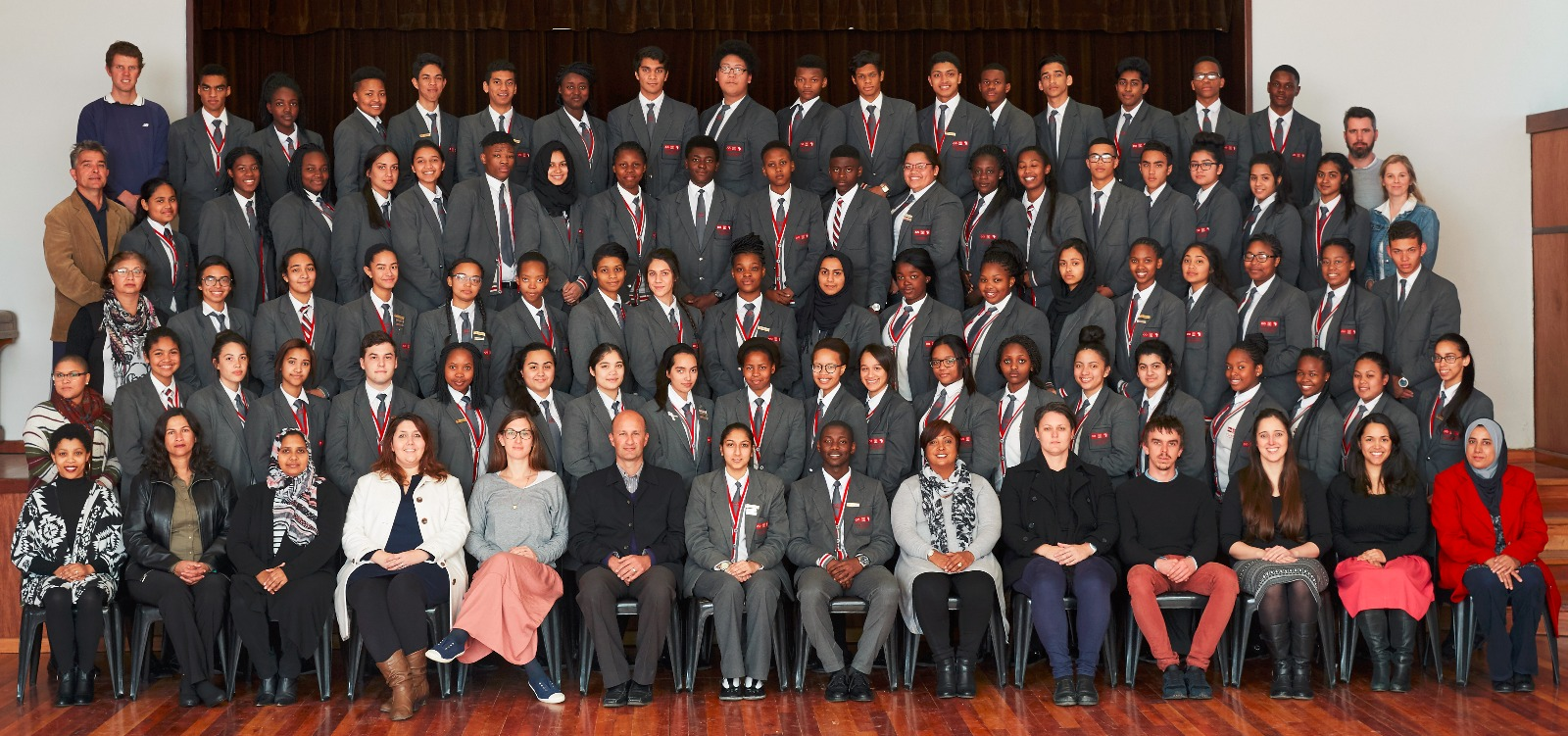
The School's outgoing class of 2016

Claremont High School is a co-educational public high school in the suburb of Claremont, Cape Town, South Africa that focuses on the teaching of mathematics and science. It was established in 2011, making it one of the newest additions to the list of schools in the area. It awards the National Senior Certificate. It is locally known for the excellent final year result it manages to produce.

The school is regarded as a very high achieving government school with consistently high matric pass rates. In 2026 the school was ranked second in the Western Cape province for academic performance.

== History ==
The city's department of education had decided to embark on a project and create a school that would primarily focus on maths and science but also be easily accessible to the diverse variety of students in Cape Town. In order to accelerate its development Westerford High School, a well-known and successful high school in close proximity, was given the task of overseeing the development of Claremont High.

Westerford's principal at the time, Rob le Roux, became the temporary principal of Claremont High during its opening year. Many of Westerford High School's teaching staff were a part of Claremont High's first teaching staff. Claremont High's growth meant that there was less influence from Westerford however there is still a good relationship between the two schools and it is still considered one of Claremont High's founding pillars.
