= Vauvillers, Haute-Saône =

Vauvillers
- Commune
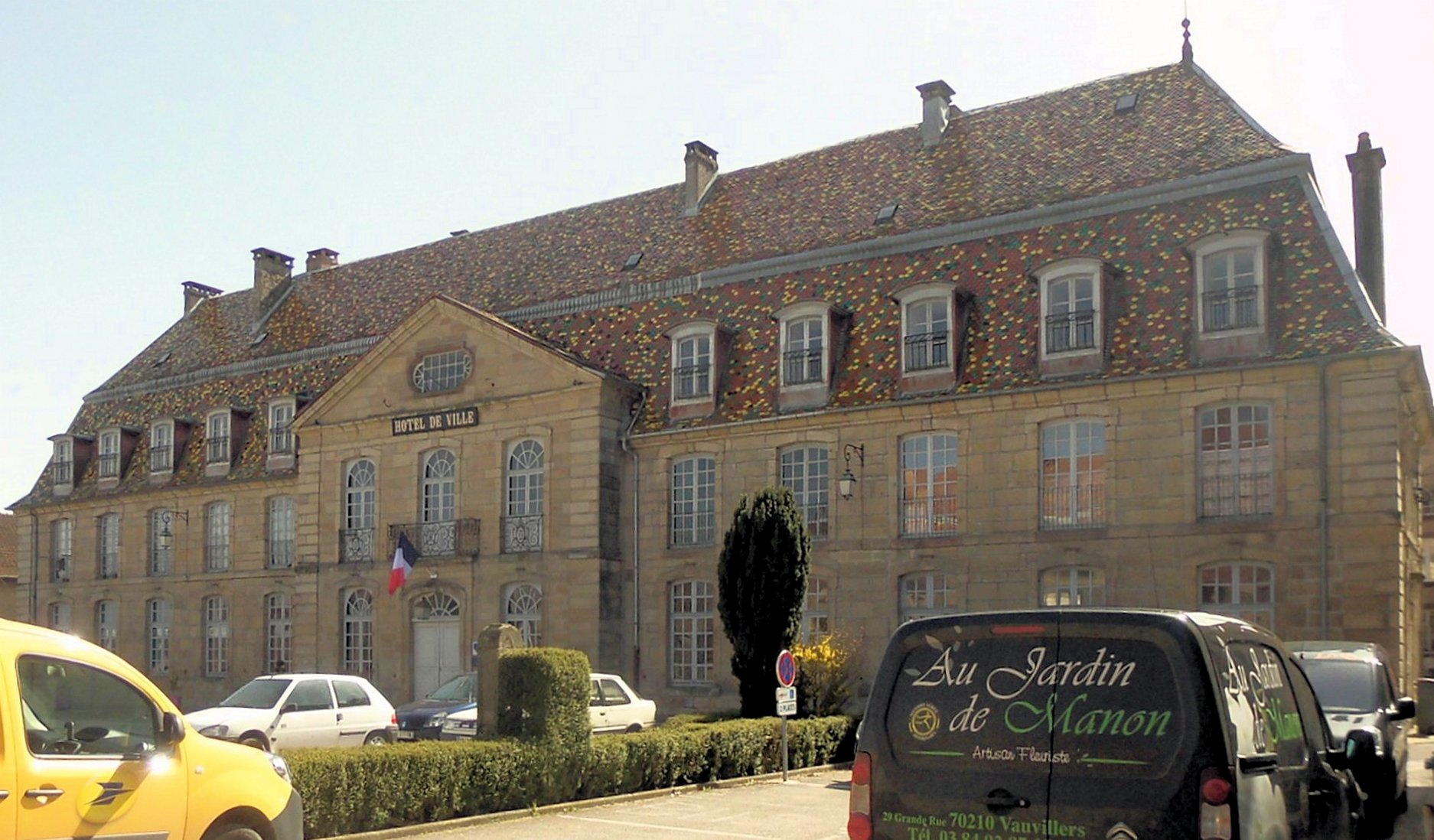
- The town hall in Vauvillers

- Coat of arms
- Location of Vauvillers
- Location within France Location within Bourgogne-Franche-Comté
- Coordinates: 47°55′24″N 6°05′54″E
- Country: France
- Region: Bourgogne-Franche-Comté
- Department: Haute-Saône
- Arrondissement: Lure
- Canton: Jussey
- Area^{1}: 9.50 km^{2} (3.67 sq mi)
- Highest elevation: 353 m (1,158 ft)
- Lowest elevation: 238 m (781 ft)
- Population (2023): 602
  - Density: 63.4/km^{2} (164/sq mi)
- Time zone: UTC+01:00 (CET)
  - Summer (DST): UTC+02:00 (CEST)
- INSEE/Postal code: 70526 /70210
- ^{1} French Land Register data, which excludes lakes, ponds, glaciers > 1 km^{2} (0.386 sq mi or 247 acres) and river estuaries.

Vauvillers is a commune in the Haute-Saône department in the region of Bourgogne-Franche-Comté in eastern France.

== See also ==
- Communes of the Haute-Saône department
