= Montclair =

Montclair is a toponym which is French for clear mountain. It may refer to:

== Places in the United States ==
- Montclair, New Jersey
  - Montclair Art Museum
  - Montclair State University
  - Upper Montclair, New Jersey
  - Montclair Public Library
- Montclair, California, a city in San Bernardino County
- Montclair, Oakland, California, a neighborhood
- Montclair, Indiana
- Montclair, Lexington, Kentucky
- Montclair (Quincy, Massachusetts), a neighborhood in Quincy
- Montclair, Cumberland County, North Carolina
- Montclair, Davidson County, North Carolina
- Montclair, Fayetteville, North Carolina, a neighborhood
- Montclair, Onslow County, North Carolina
- Montclair, Scotland County, North Carolina
- Montclair, Wilson County, North Carolina
- Sunset Terrace/Montclair, Houston, a neighborhood in Houston, Texas
- Montclair, Virginia

== Other uses ==
- Mercury Montclair, a line of automobiles made by Ford Motor Company in the 1950s
- Montclair bottled water, produced by Nestlé Waters North America
- Montclair cigarettes, produced by Commonwealth Brands
- USS Montclair (ID-3497), a United States Navy refrigerated cargo ship in commission from 1918 to 1919
- Operation Montclair, a military operation by the US and Australia during World War II

== See also ==
- Mont Clare (disambiguation)
- Montclair Elementary School (disambiguation)
- Montclair High School (disambiguation)
- Montclair, North Carolina (disambiguation)
- Montclar (disambiguation)
- Mount Clare (disambiguation)
- Moncler, Italian fashion brand
- Clairmont (disambiguation), an inversion
