= Montclair, North Carolina =

Montclair, North Carolina may refer to:

- Montclair, Cumberland County, North Carolina
- Montclair, Davidson County, North Carolina
- Montclair, Fayetteville, North Carolina
- Montclair, Onslow County, North Carolina
- Montclair, Scotland County, North Carolina
- Montclair, Wilson County, North Carolina

== See also ==
- Montclair (disambiguation)
