= Montclar =

Montclar may refer to the following places:

- Montclar, Alpes-de-Haute-Provence, a commune in the department of Alpes-de-Haute-Provence, France
- Montclar, Aude, a commune in the department of Aude, France
- Montclar, Aveyron, a commune in the department of Aveyron, France
- Montclar, Berguedà, a municipality in the county of Berguedà, autonomous region of Catalonia, Spain
- Montclar d'Urgell, a settlement in the municipality of Agramunt, county of Urgell, autonomous region of Catalonia, Spain
- Montclar-de-Comminges, a commune in the department of Haute-Garonne, France
- Montclar-Lauragais, a commune in the department of Haute-Garonne, France
- Montclar-sur-Gervanne, a commune in the department of Drôme, France

or to the following people:

- Joseph de Montclar (1625–90), French cavalry general

== See also ==
- Montclair (disambiguation)
- Mont Clare (disambiguation)
