= Mount Clare =

Mount Clare may refer to:

- Mount Clare (Maryland), historic house (1763) in Baltimore, Maryland, USA
- Mount Clare (Roehampton), historic house (1773) in Roehampton, south west London
- Mount Clare Shops, historic railroad complex founded by Baltimore and Ohio Railroad
- Mount Clare Station, a former railroad station in Baltimore which is now part of the National Museum of Railroad History & Innovation
- Mount Clare, Illinois
- Mount Clare, Nebraska
- Mount Clare, West Virginia

== See also ==
- Montclair (disambiguation)
- Mont Clare (disambiguation)
