= St. James Church, Montclar =

Church in Montclar d'Urgell, Catalonia

Coordinates: 41°50′52″N 1°02′32″E

St. James' Church
- St. James' Church
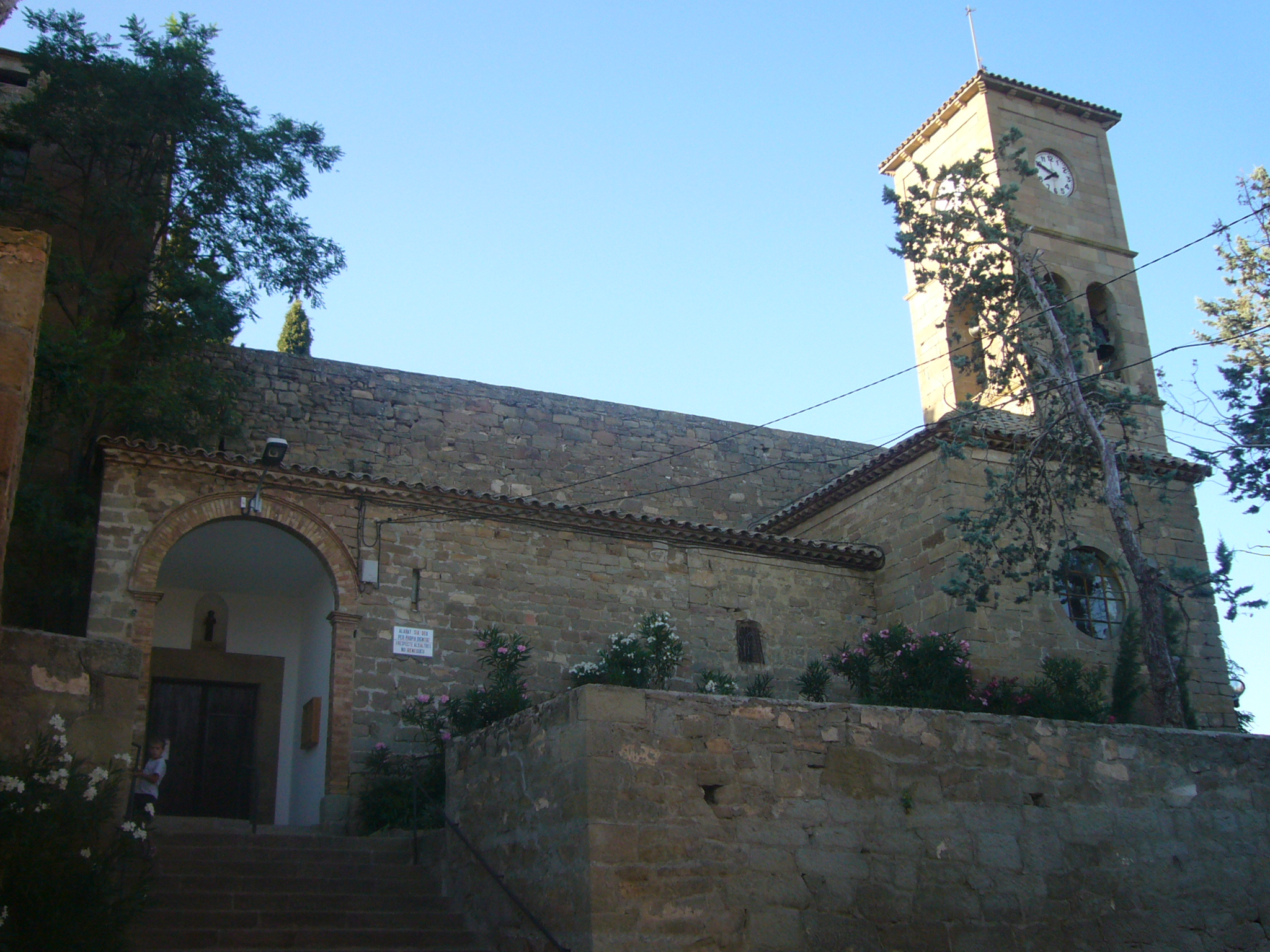
- St. James' Church, Montclar d'Urgell
- St. James' Church
- Location: Montclar d'Urgell
- Country: Spain
- Denomination: Roman Catholic

History
- Status: Parish church

Architecture
- Functional status: Active

Administration
- Diocese: Roman Catholic Diocese of Urgell

Clergy
- Archbishop: Roman Catholic Archdiocese of Tarragona

St. James Church is a Baroque church located in Montclar d'Urgell, in the municipality of Agramunt. It is a building included in the Inventory of the Architectural Heritage of Catalonia.

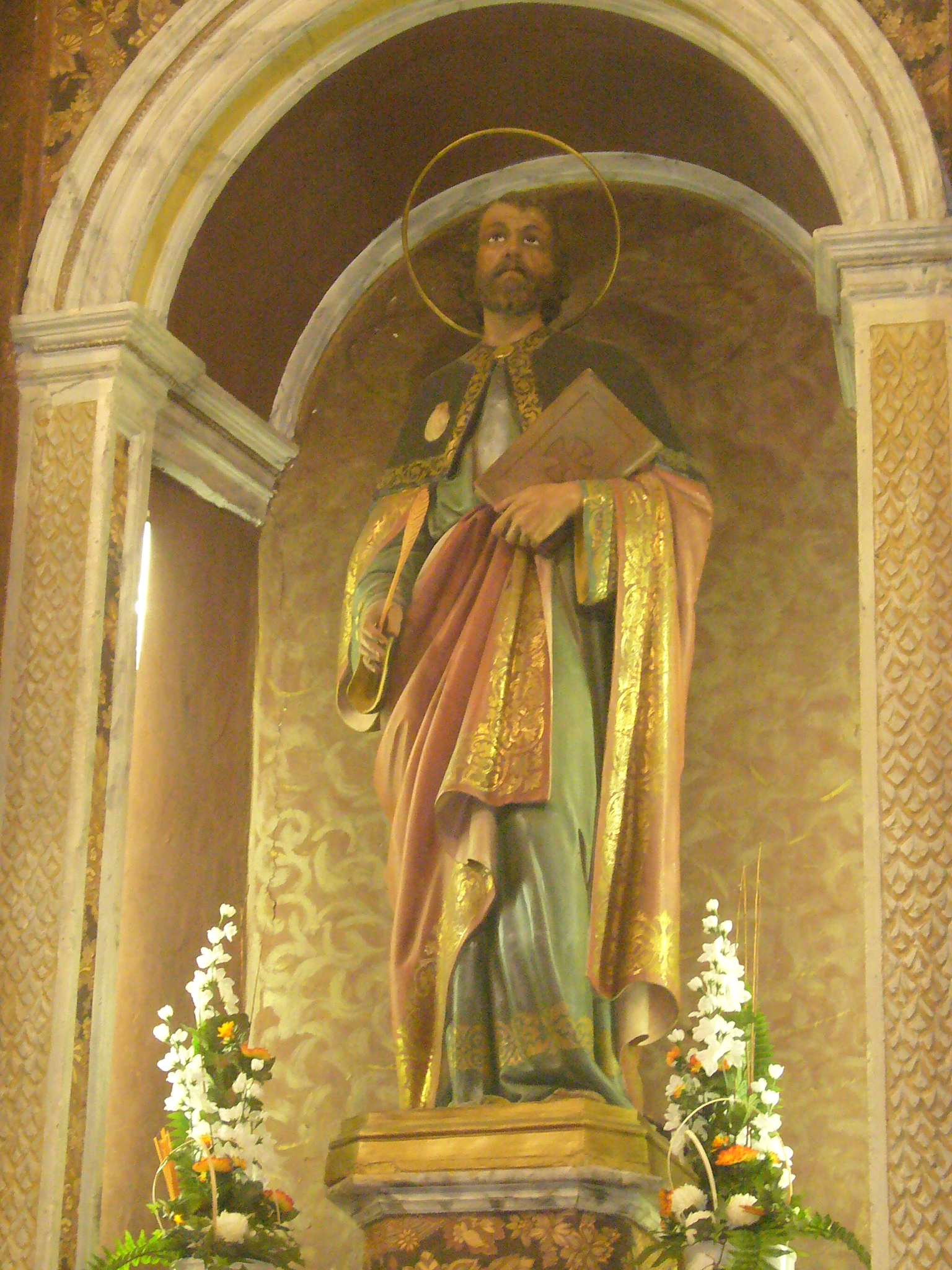
St. James statue

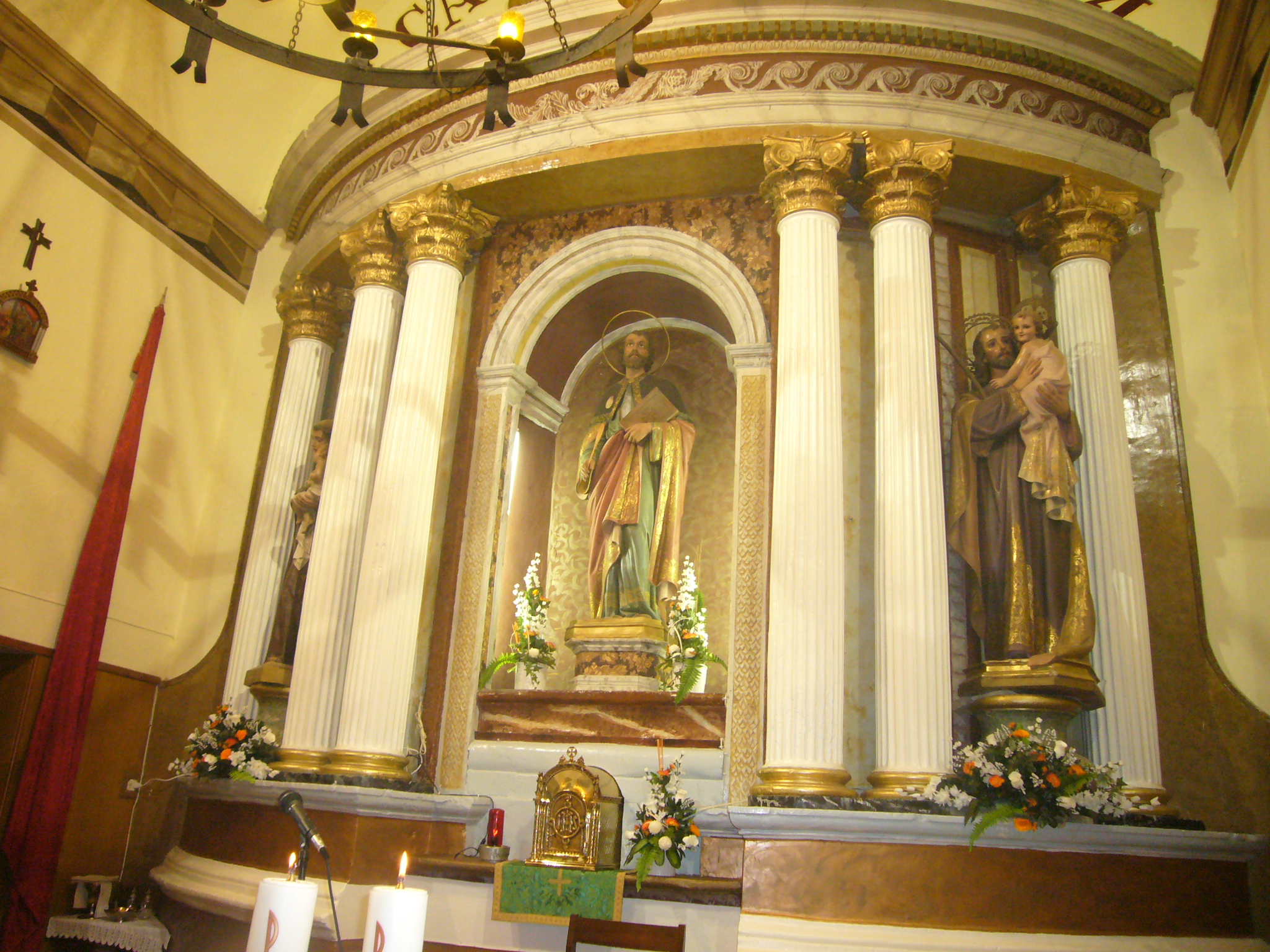
Apse of the church

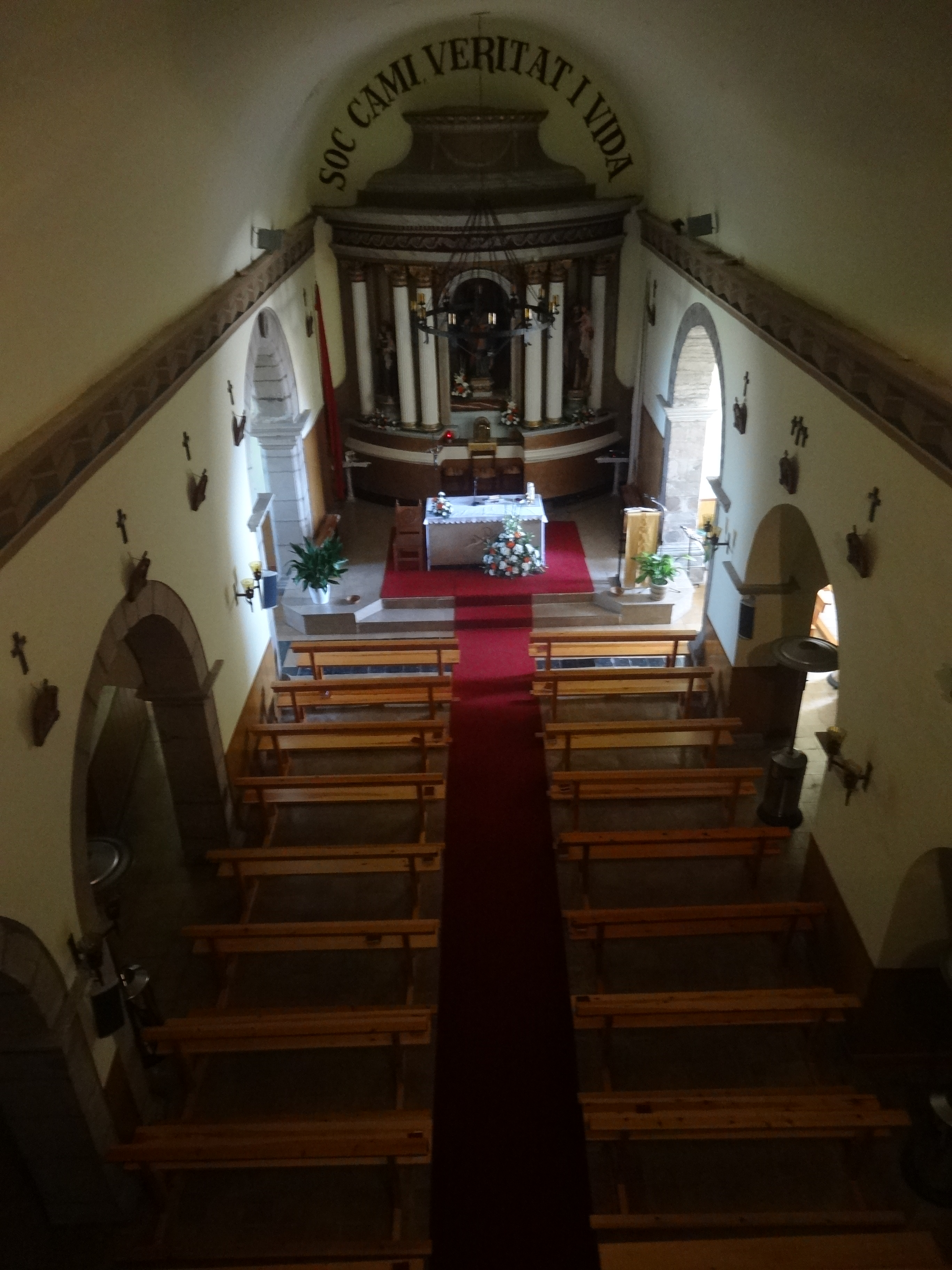
Interior of the church

== Description ==
The church is a single-nave church covered with a barrel vault, which opens with three side chapels through a half-point arch. Two small domes rise on each side of the transept. The main apse is polygonal. In the re-decoration there is a remarkable and innovative element for the churches of this period. There is a double tribune, one that communicates with the Montclar Castle, and another lower one corresponding to the church itself. The entrance to the church is at the foot of the west wall, through a large staircase and a semi-circular arch made of bricks. The bell tower is quadrangular and subdivided into three floors. On the first floor there are half-point openings that house the bells and on the top floor there is a clock on each face of the tower. It is made of perfectly cut regular ashlars and is crowned with a pyramidal roof.

== History ==
Before this current church, there had been a medieval iteration of the church, possibly dedicated to Saint John. That is why it was built in the XVIII century on a previous church dedicated to Sant Joan. The church depended on Saint Peter of Àger until the XIX century. To the east is the bell tower dated to 1628 in which there are two bells built in 1814.
