= Mont Clare =

Mont Clare or Montclare may refer to:

== Places ==
- Montclare, Chicago, Illinois, a neighborhood on the west side of the city, near Elmwood Park
  - Mont Clare station (Illinois), a train station serving the Chicago neighborhood
- Mont Clare, Pennsylvania, a village in Montgomery County, or the estate that gave the village its current name
  - Mont Clare Bridge, a bridge connecting the Pennsylvania village
  - Mont Clare station (Pennsylvania Railroad), the former village railroad station
- Mont Clare, South Carolina, a village in Darlington County

== Other ==
- Mont Clare, a line of stainless steel flatware from Waterford Wedgwood
- HMS Montclare (F85), a Canadian Pacific Steamships ship built in 1921 for passenger service, pressed into the Royal Navy for World War II

== See also ==
- Montclair (disambiguation), the French spelling
- Montclar (disambiguation)
- Mount Clare (disambiguation)
- Clairemont (disambiguation)
- Clairmont (disambiguation)
- Claremont (disambiguation)
- Clermont (disambiguation)
