= Montclar Castle =

- Catalan: Castell de Montclar
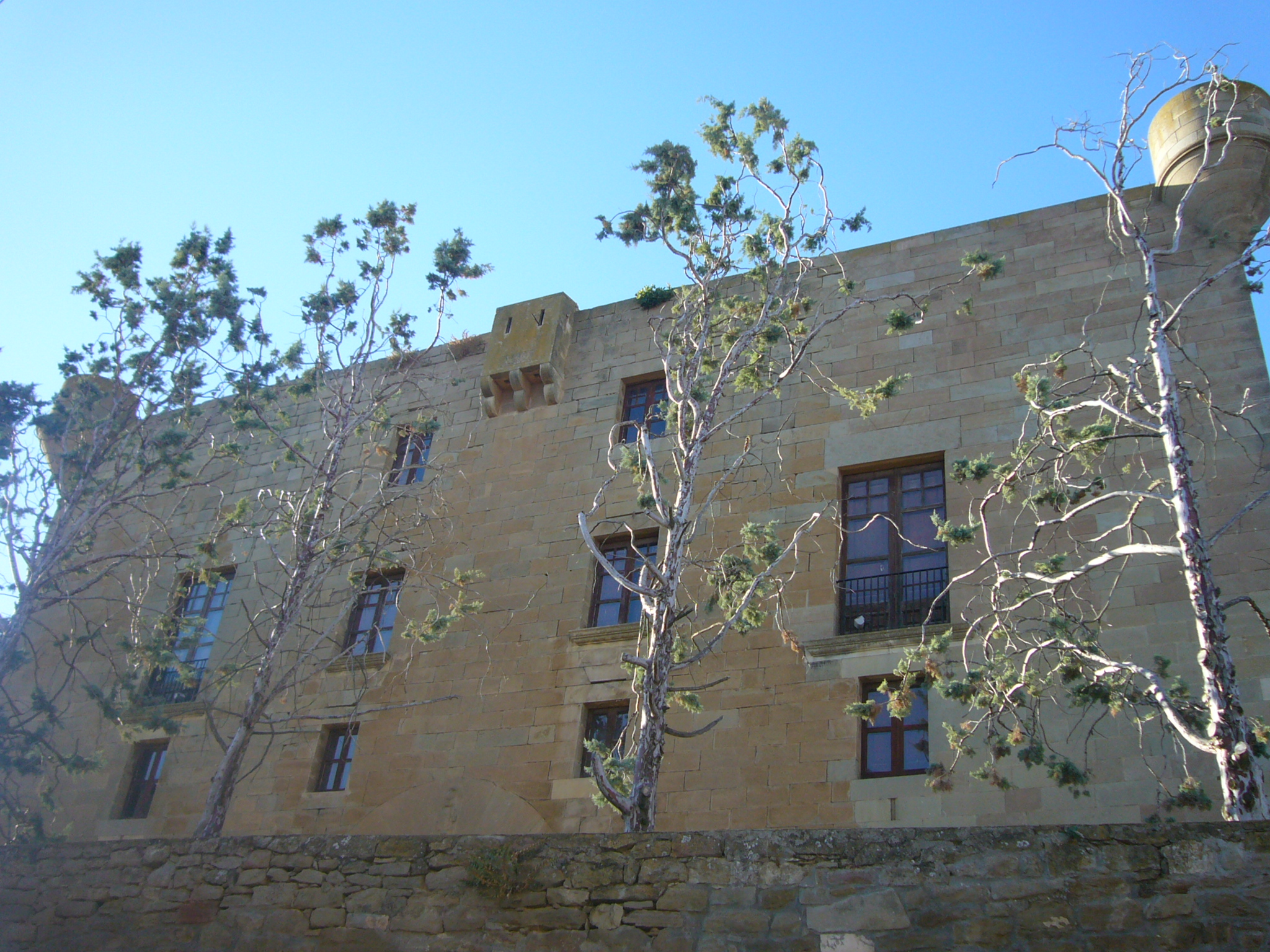
- Montclar Castle

- Location within Spain

General information
- Type: Fortress
- Architectural style: Medieval
- Location: Montclar d'Urgell, Catalonia, Spain, C/ Barons de Montclar, nr.1, Montclar d'Urgell, Spain
- Coordinates: 41°50′52″N 1°2′26″E
- Elevation: 470 feet (140 m)
- Completed: 981
- Renovated: 1635
- Owner: Juan Francisco de Miguel

Montclar Castle is a fortress in Montclar d'Urgell, Catalonia, designated a national historic-artistic monument in 1979. It is strategically located at one of the highest points of the Montclar mountain range. It is built on the remains of an ancient Roman tower and was renovated in the 17th century with an architecture of the Catalan Renaissance.

== Description ==
The building, made of well-hewn stone, has several defensive elements, such as the slope, the turrets of the angles, or the central matacán. The portal is formed by large dovelas. In the central dome there is the coat of arms or lordly coat of arms, and the date 1635. In 1970 the building was carefully restored.

The interior of the castle can be visited and is structured in large rooms, including: the cellar, which still preserves the wood for the wine; the armor of the entrance; the grand central staircase; the library and the music room. There is also a terrace, which houses a well. Other elements to highlight are the original stone signs to monitor the prisoners, located on the prison wall and on the exterior facades; the great dining room, scene of medieval dinners; the prison and the dungeons; or direct access to a box office in the church of Saint James to attend services from the castle.

== History ==
The jurisdiction of Montclar, which belonged in the XIV century to the Ponts family and in the XVI century to the Guimerà, passed by marriage link (1686) to the Despujols, marquises of Palmerola. In 1919, the barony of Montclar was recognized in favor of Josep M. Despujol i Ricart, Marquis of Palmerola.

Only five families have owned Montclar castle since 1200: the Cabrera, the Ribelles, the Ponts, the Despujols and since 1986, the Miguels.

== Gallery ==
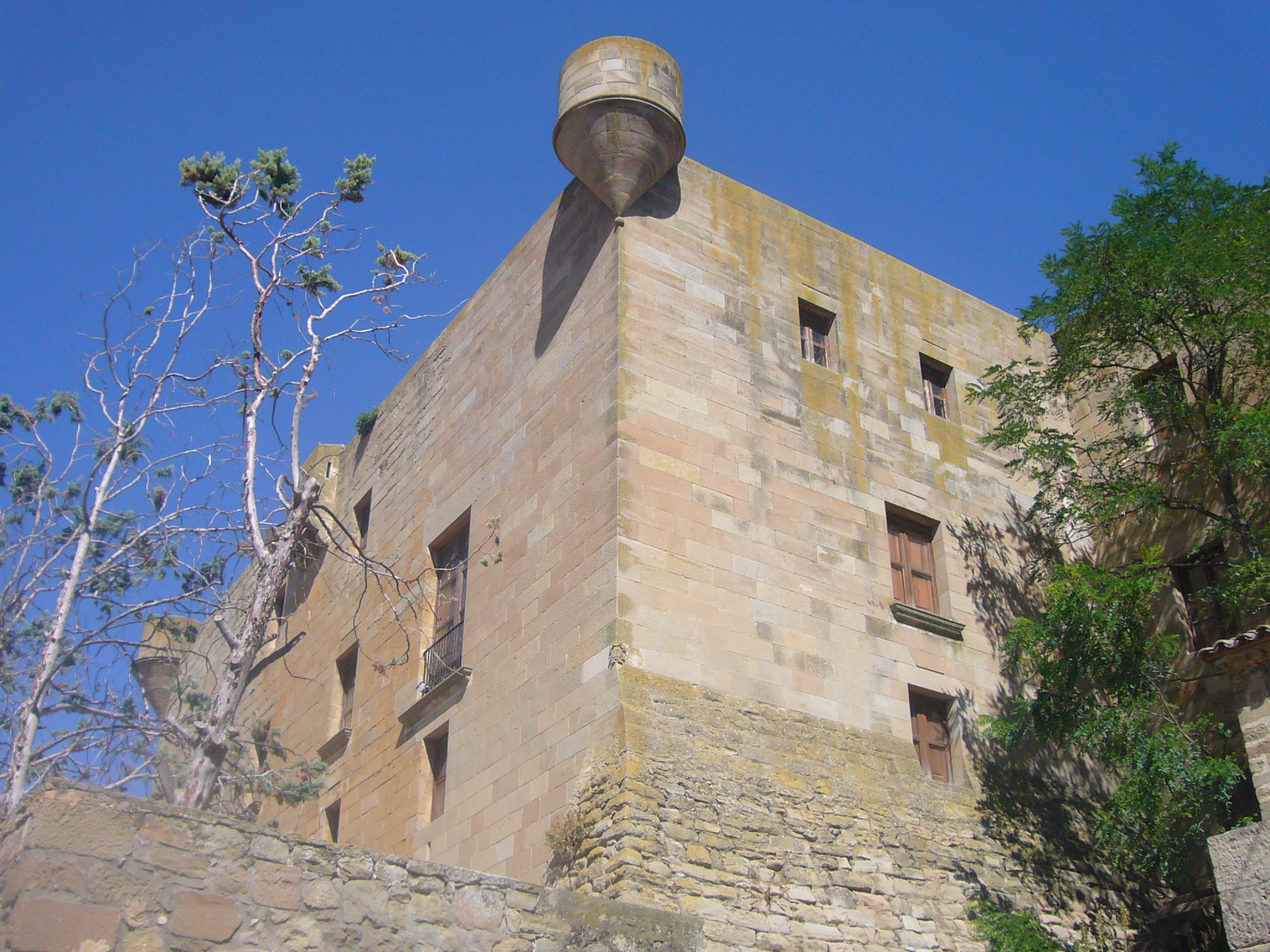
Angle sud-est

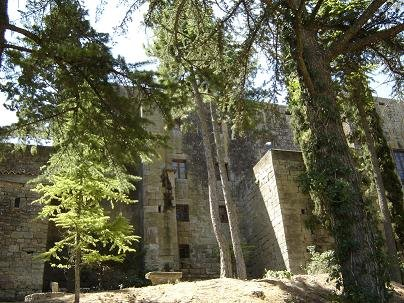
Cara nord del Castell

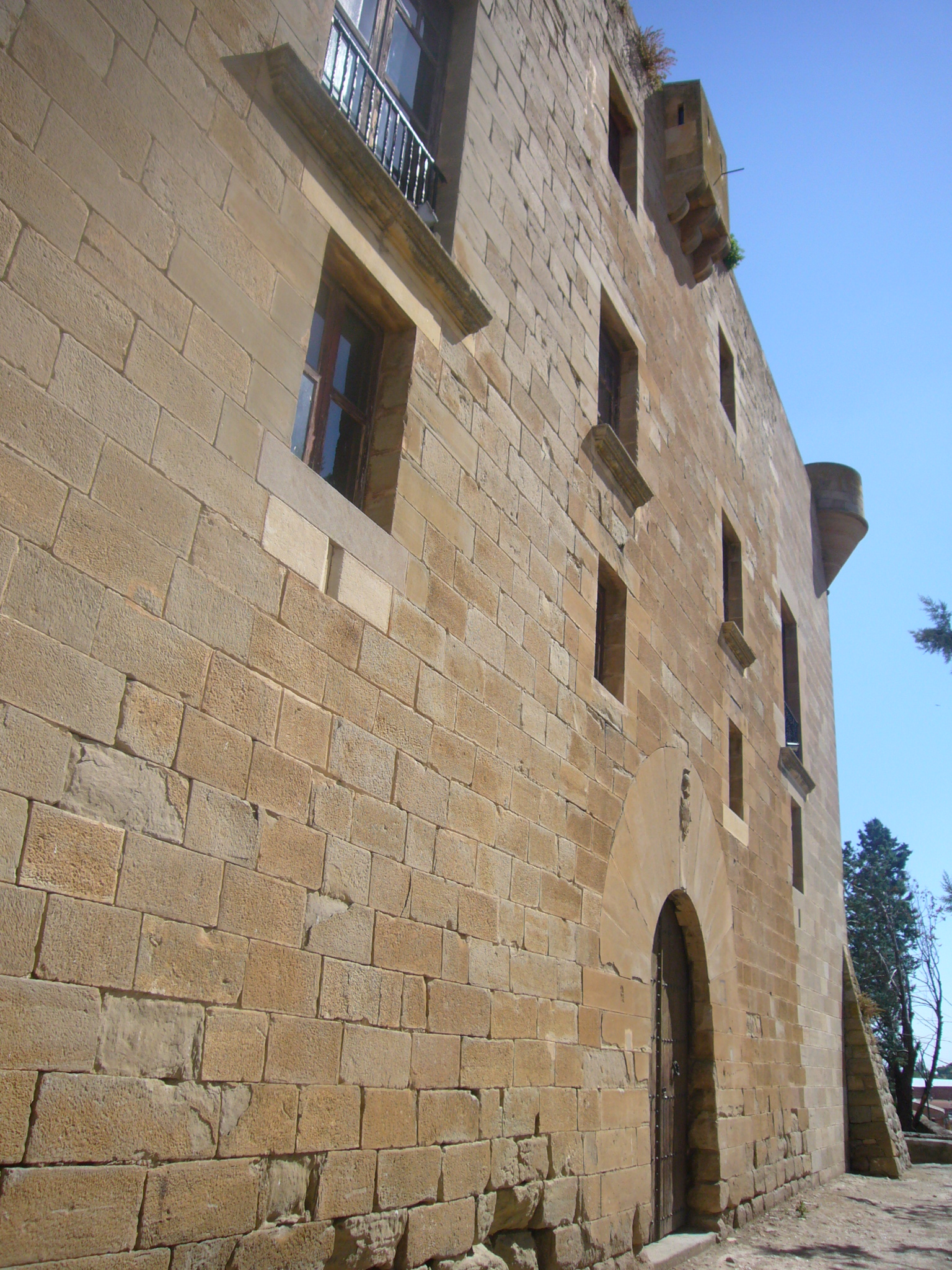
Porta principal a la cara sud

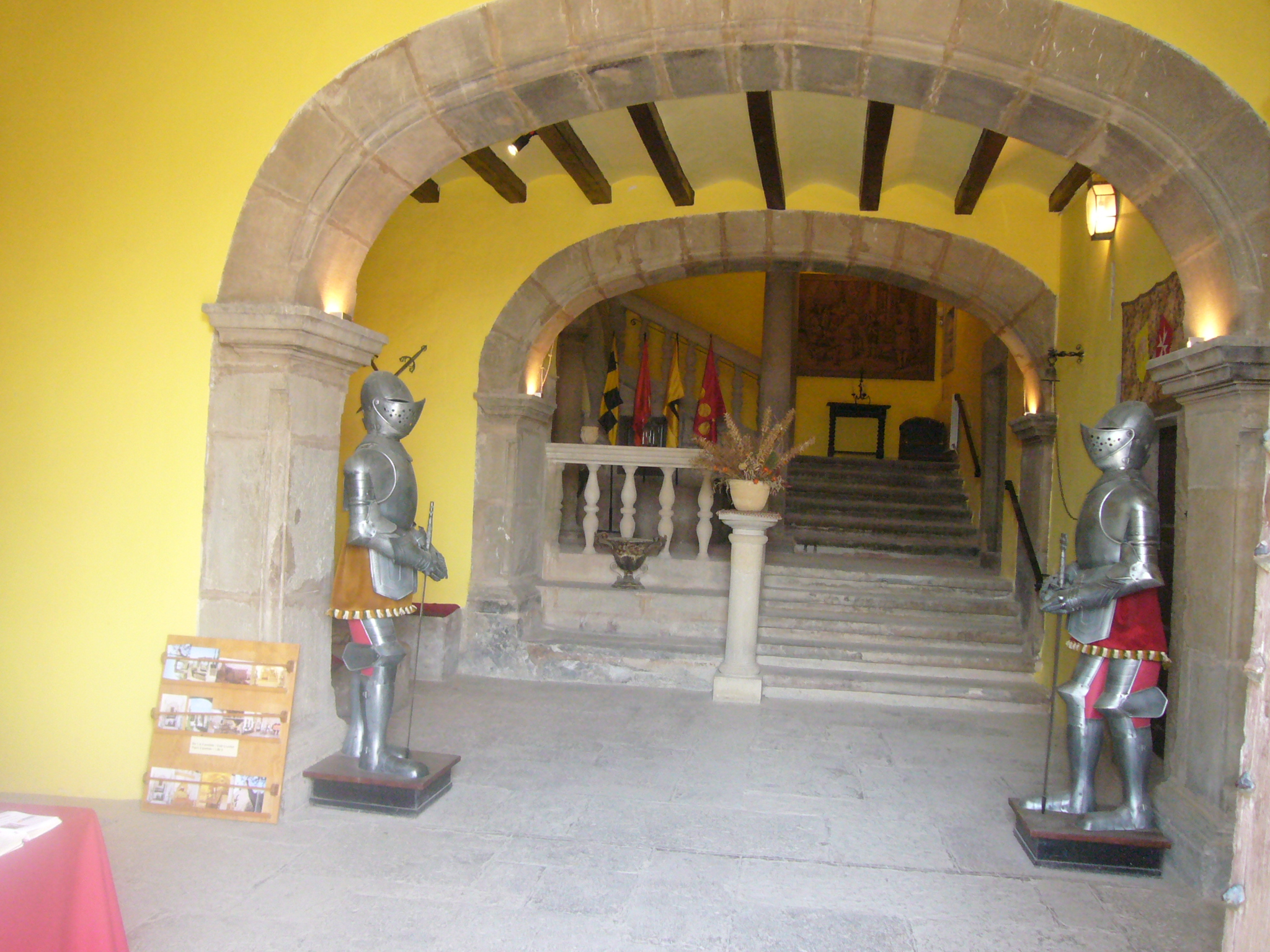
Recepció amb dues armadures i escala principal
