= Montclair High School =

Montclair High School may refer to:

- Montclair High School (California) in Montclair, California
- Montclair High School (New Jersey) in Montclair, New Jersey
