= Montclair, Lexington =

Montclair
- Neighborhood of Lexington, Kentucky
- Interactive map of Montclair
- Coordinates: 38.022°N 84.497°W
- Country: United States
- State: Kentucky
- County: Fayette
- City: Lexington

Area
  - Total: .106 sq mi (0.27 km^{2})
  - Water: 0 sq mi (0.0 km^{2})

Population (2000)
  - Total: 440
  - Density: 4,159/sq mi (1,606/km^{2})
- Time zone: UTC-5 (Eastern (EST))
  - Summer (DST): UTC-4 (EDT)
- ZIP code: 40502
- Area code: 859

Montclair is a neighborhood in southeastern Lexington, Kentucky, United States. Its boundaries are Providence Road to the north, Montclair Drive to the south, Tates Creek Road to the east, and the University of Kentucky to the west.

== Neighborhood statistics ==
- Area: 0.106 square miles (0.27 km^{2})
- Population: 440
- Population density: 4,159 people per square mile
- Median household income (2010): $56,383
