= Montclar d'Urgell =

- village
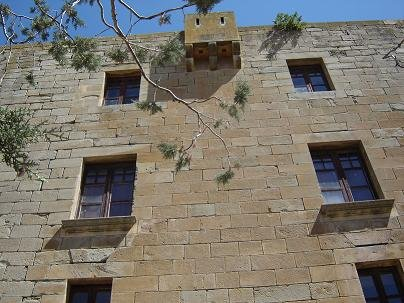

- Location in Catalonia
- Coordinates: 41°50′51″N 1°02′34″E
- Country: Spain
- Community: Catalonia
- Province: Lleida
- Comarca: Urgell

Government
  - Mayor: Josep Maria Porta

Area
  - Total: 9.50 km^{2} (3.67 sq mi)
- Elevation: 470 m (1,540 ft)

Population (2022)
  - Total: 90
  - Density: 9.5/km^{2} (25/sq mi)
- Demonym(s): Montclarí, montclarina
- Time zone: UTC+1 (CET)
  - Summer (DST): UTC+2 (CEST)
- Postal code: 25317

Montclar d'Urgell is a village in the province of Lleida, in Catalonia, Spain. The village and its surrounding area previously formed its own municipality, but it is now (since 1970) an exclave of Agramunt. It is also an exclave of the comarca of Urgell, lying within the comarca of Noguera. The village is located on the crest of the Montclar mountain range, that crosses out from east to west. The Urgell Canal passes through and crosses the Montclar range through a tunnel. Montclar is linked by road to the local C-14 between Artesa de Segre and Agramunt.

== Population ==
1900	1930	1950	1970	1986	2022
n/a	n/a	n/a	235	n/a	90

== Points of interest ==
=== Montclar Castle ===
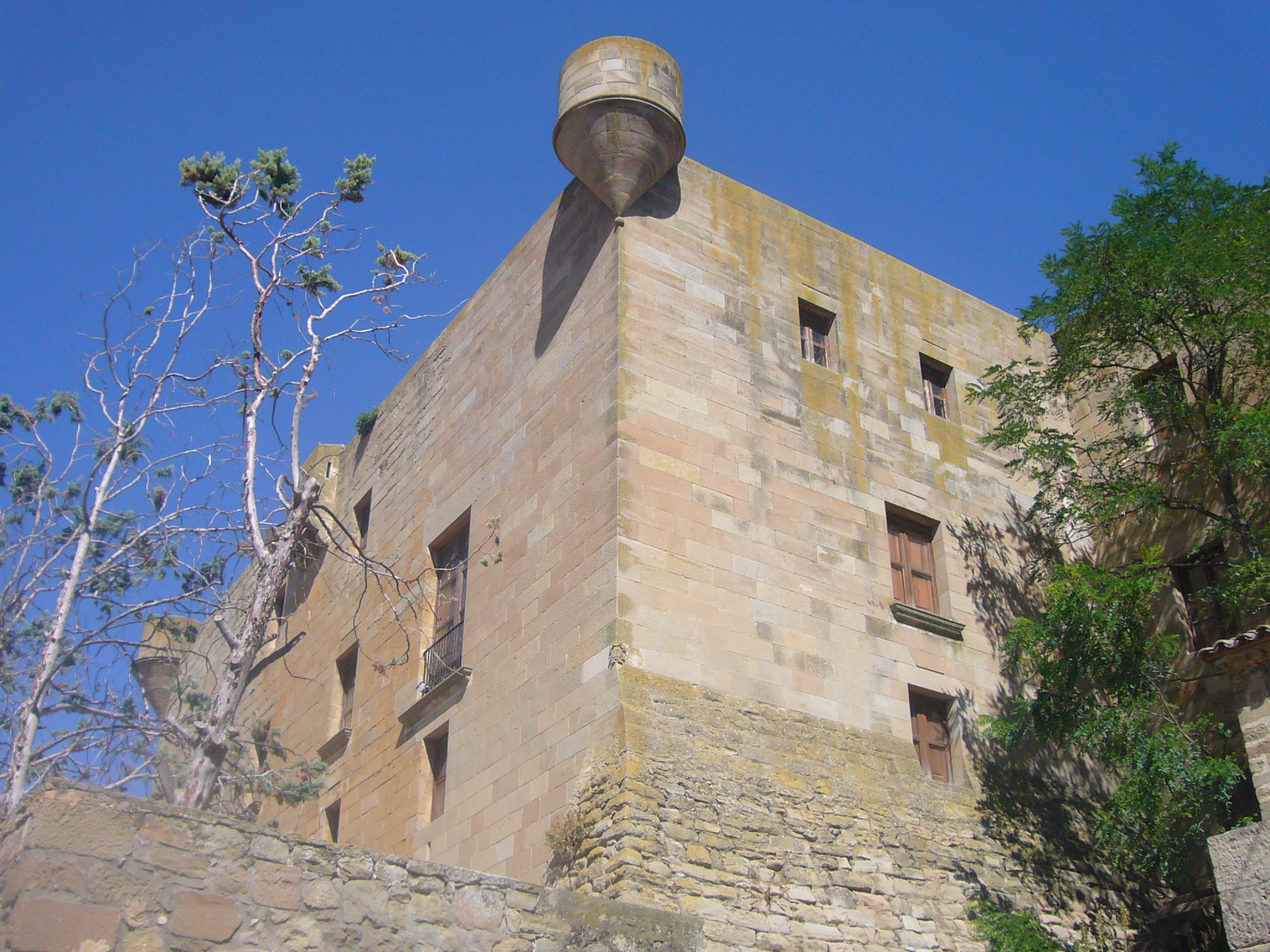
Montclar Castle

The majestic Montclar Castle presided over the town that bears his name. The castle was built on the remains of an old Roman tower keep. The castle is documented from the year 981, making it the oldest in the area. Inside, part of the wall of the tower from the tribute century Roman II can still be seen. Most of the first floor of the present castle was built in the thirteenth century. Also, the upper floors were remodelled after the Christian Reconquest and currently show an elegant architecture of the Catalan Renaissance dating from the sixteenth to the seventeenth centuries. The castle was restored in 1970, was declared a national Historic Monument in 1979 and is now open to visitors.

Only six families have owned the Montclar castle from the Christian reconquest: the Tost (until 1067), the Cabrera (1067-1179), the Ribelles (1179-1418), the Pons (1418-1689), the Despujol (1689-1986) and Miguel (1986 to present).

=== Church of St. James ===
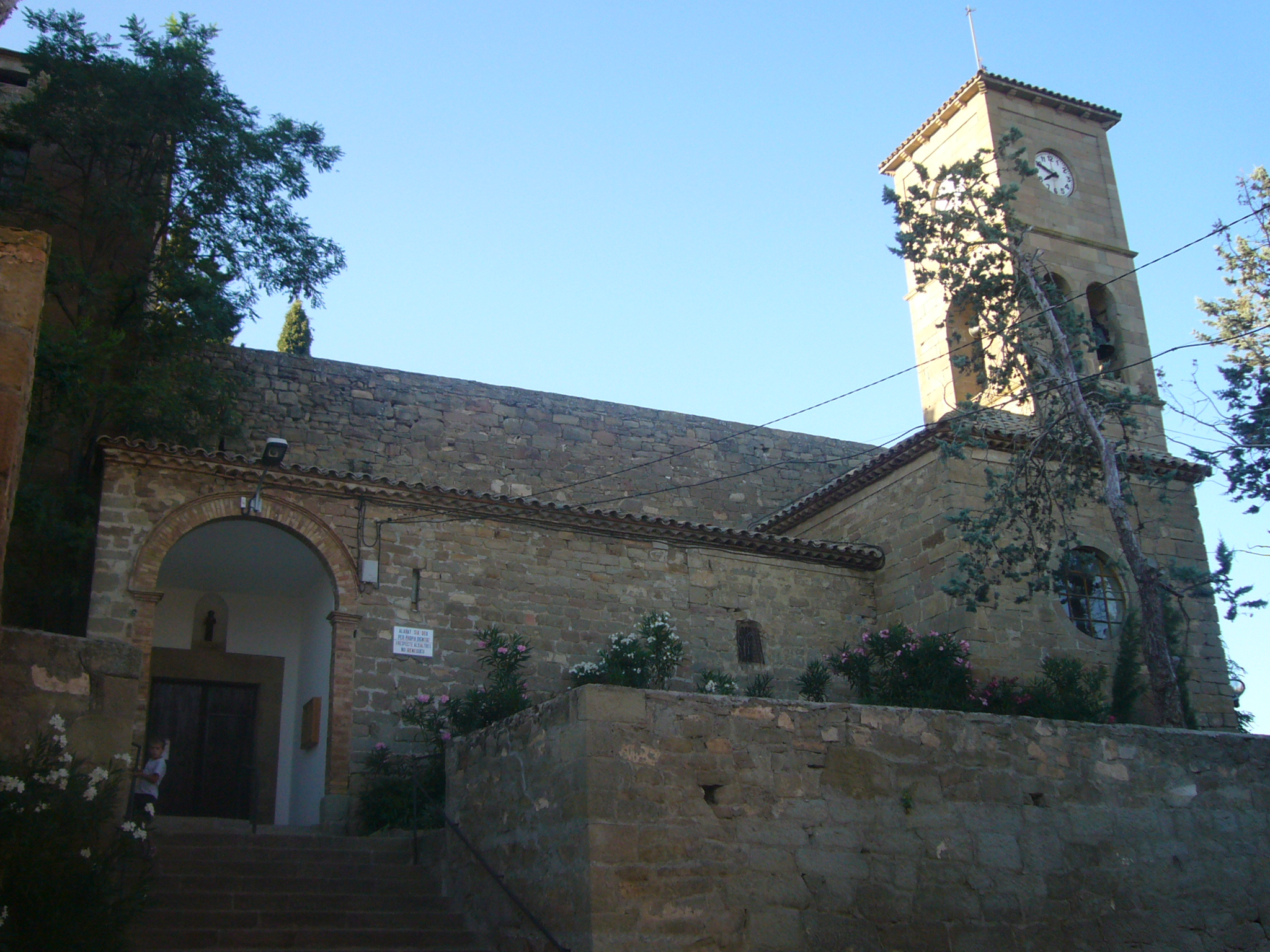
St. James church

St. James Church is the parish church, and is dedicated to St. James. Built in the seventeenth century Baroque style. The building is of stone, has a six altar and side altars. One feature that makes it unique are the two hearts that unlike all the churches in which they are placed one on each side, they are placed one above the other. The heart only accessible from above the castle and allowed nobles to attend Mass without mixing with the lower classes. Currently there is still celebrating Mass every Sunday.

=== Montclar Mine ===
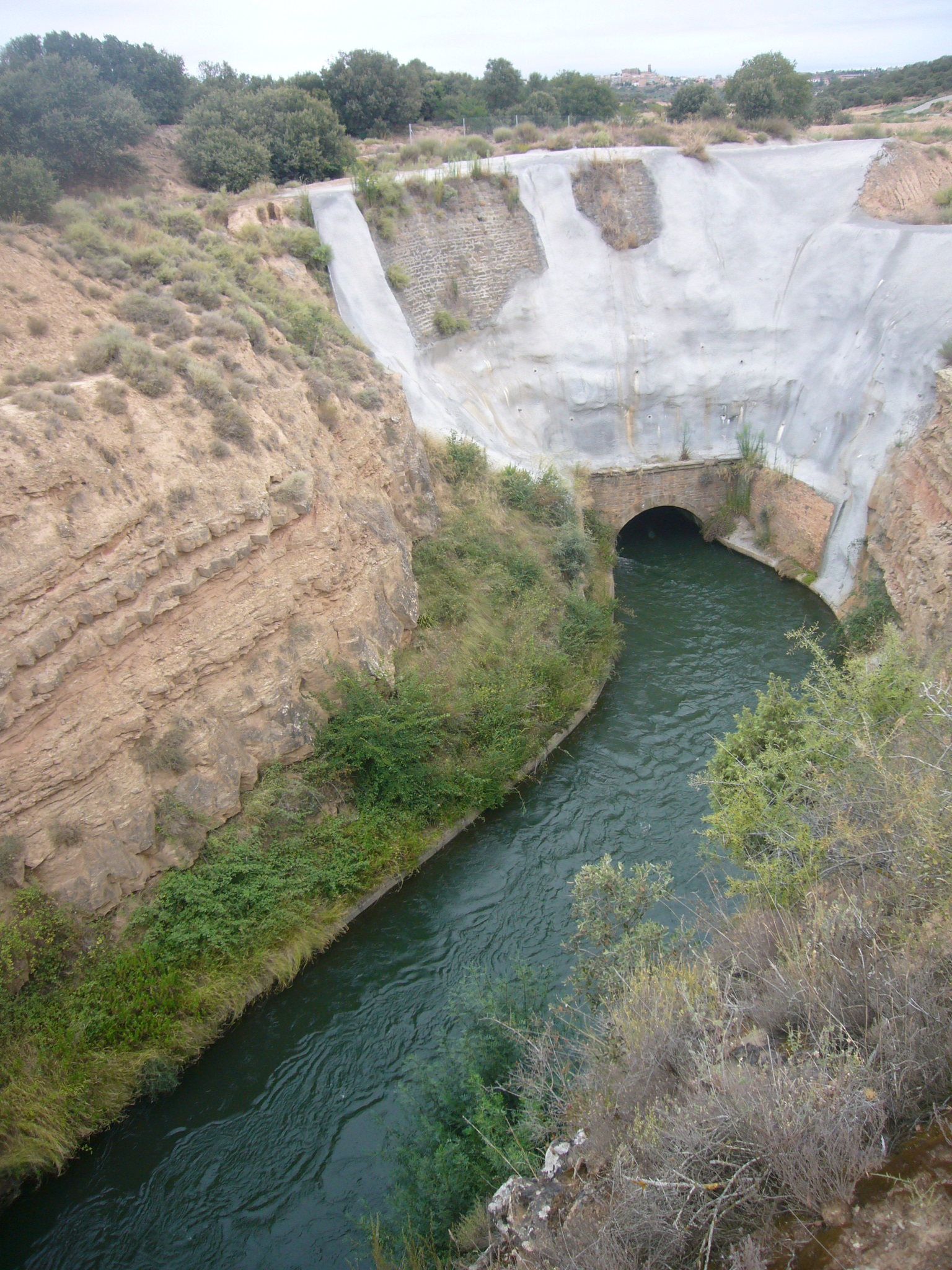
The Montclar Mine

At 160 meters (520 ft) deep and close to the vertical village, the canal crosses the Montclar range through an impressive tunnel known as the Montclar Mine. The tunnel is completely straight, with a length of 4,917 m (16,132 ft), a width of 5.15 m (16.9 ft) and a height of 5.47 m (17.9 ft). The mine began building in November 1853 and was fully completed in November 1861, thanks to the workload of 150 animals and more than 6,000 people, including architects, masons, laborers and especially to convict forced realized toughest and dangerous jobs. Hundreds of them died during construction and were buried in a mass grave in the cemetery of Montclar, hence we can see that this is unusually large for a town of this size. For your convenience 13 wells were drilled from the surface of the mountain to the appropriate level. All the work was done by force of arms, thus removing debris excavated more than 500 trucks. For nearly a century it was the longest tunnel and hydraulic works in Europe. In 1977, repairs were made in the central part where the water made great caverns in the rock. During the winter organized hike inside the tunnel.

== Culture ==
=== Folklore ===
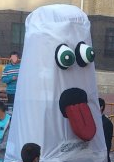
The Jaumet ghost

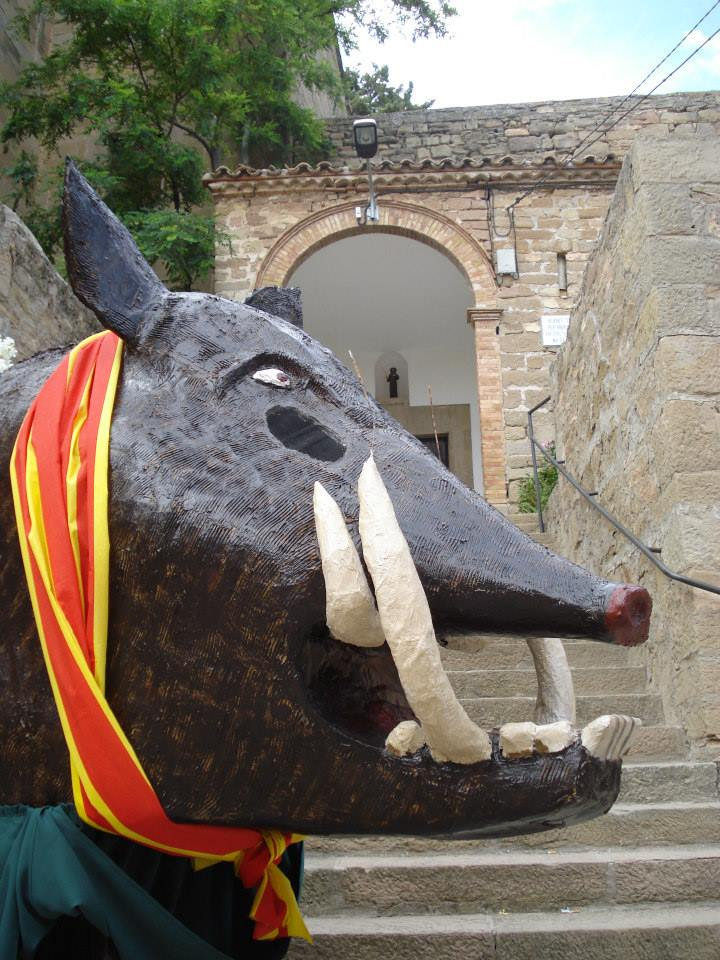
The Massaporc Wild boar

- The "Fantasma Jaumet" is a giant ghost built in 2011 with a wooden structure has a height of 3 meters (9.8 ft) and a width of 2.5 meters (8.2 ft). It's responsible for making the first dance festival in Saint James, the most important festival of the village. In 2012 it was changed and he included a tongue and eyes of cardboard phones. Montclar people always told legends of ghosts and witches. These legends are fueled largely by the presence of the Montclar castle. This led to the construction of a giant ghost form, which took the name in honor Saint James, patron of the village.
- The Massaporc an element of beast Montclar Urgell shaped wild boar, built in 2013 with a wooden structure and coating Cardboard. The wild boar is an animal that is easily to find on the Montclar mountain range.

=== Local festivals ===
- Saint Sebastian, January 20: Montclar people vote him in gratitude to cure the plague village. Currently held.
- Saint Vicente, on January 22, if the day of the festival was sunny, Montclar people kept an oil lamp burning throughout the year in the skull of Saint Vincent, located in the church of St. James. All the villagers contributed oil to keep it burning. If, however, the day was foggy, he did not light the whole for a year.
- Saint Mark, April 25, on Sunday later all the people walk in procession to the shrine Salgar located 8 km (5 mi) Montclar formerly the mayor and aldermen encapçalavent the procession and no one could speak all the way up to the shrine.
- Saint James, July 25: it is dedicated the church and on the closest weekend, the festival takes place, which is one of the busiest in the province, and has seen performances of groups such as Ebri Knight, Xeic!, Doctor Prats, La Terrasseta de Preixens or Radiocrimen.

== Notable people ==
- Josep de Pons i de Guimerá (1625–1690), known as General Montclar, general of the French army during the Franco-Dutch War and the Nine Years' War.
- Josep Alsina i Casas (1907–1936), known as Agustine of Montclar, Capuchin preacher friar, philosopher and poet. He is venerated as a saint by the Catholic Church.
