= Agramunt =

- Municipality
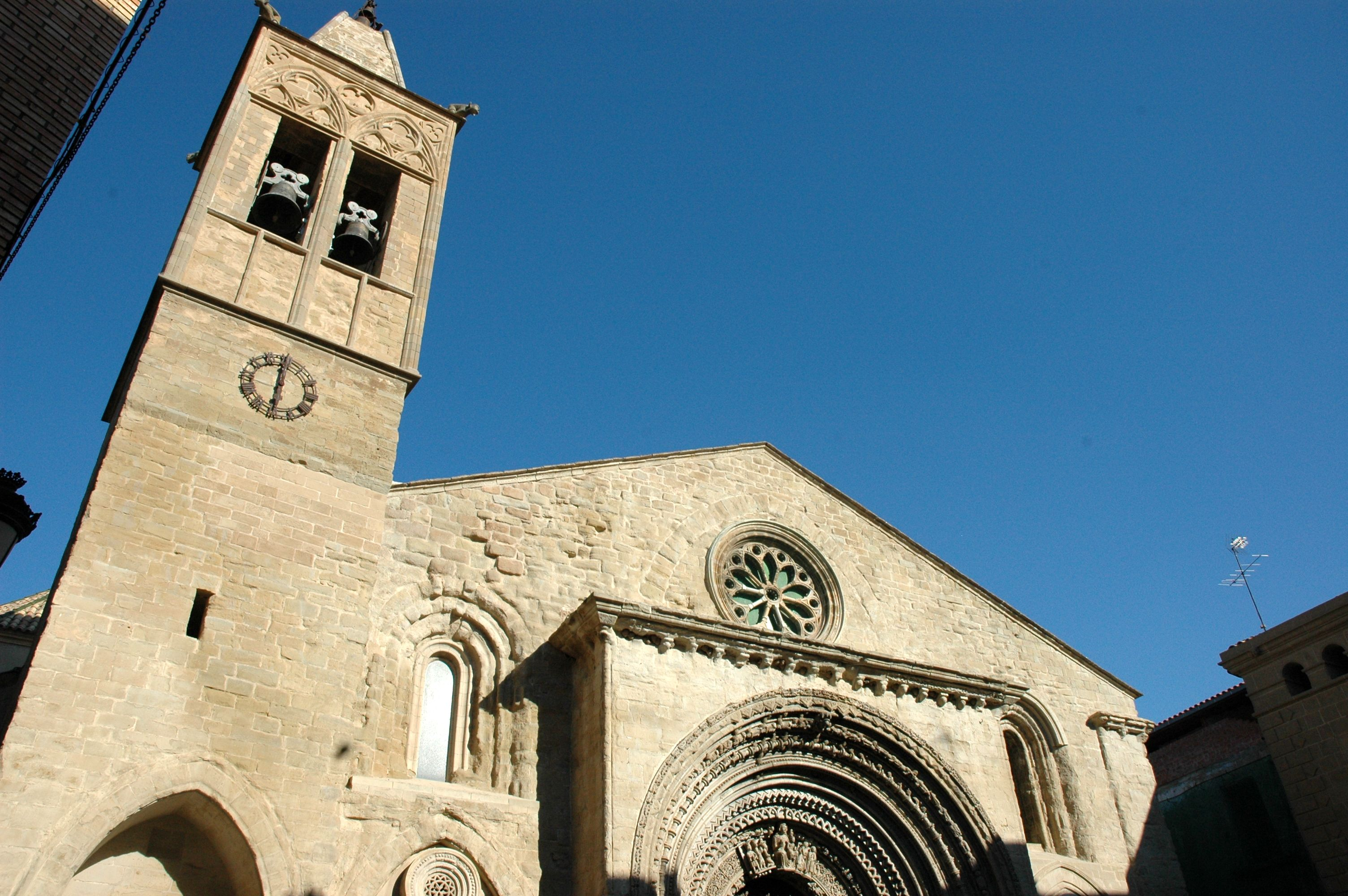

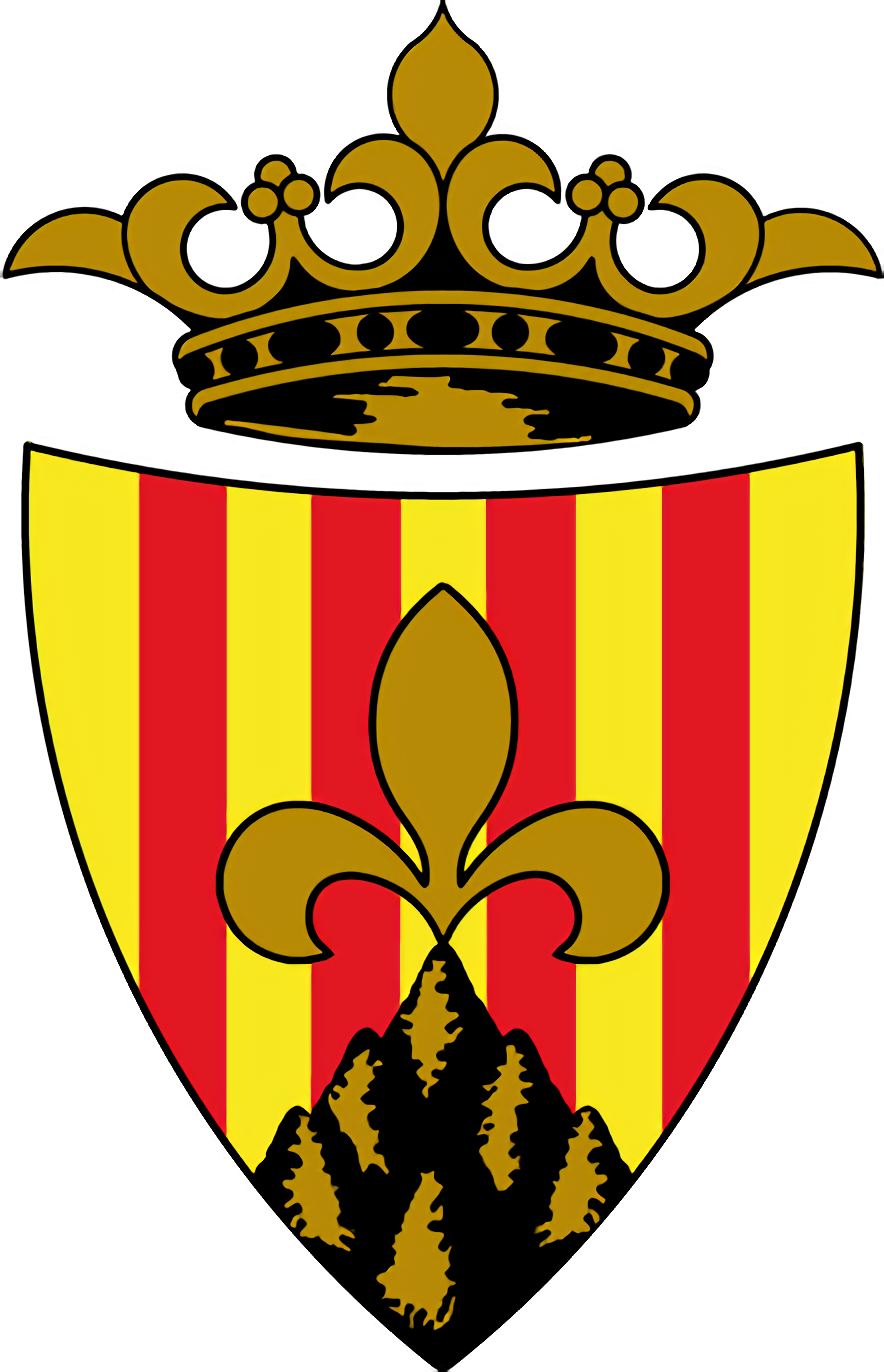
- Coat of arms

- Location in Catalonia
- Coordinates: 41°47′N 1°06′E
- Country: Spain
- Community: Catalonia
- Province: Lleida
- Comarca: Urgell

Government
  - Mayor: Bernat Solé Barril (2015)

Area
  - Total: 79.6 km^{2} (30.7 sq mi)
- Elevation: 337 m (1,106 ft)

Population (2025-01-01)
  - Total: 5,653
  - Density: 71.0/km^{2} (184/sq mi)
- Demonyms: Agramuntí, agramuntina
- Website: agramunt.cat

Agramunt (Catalan pronunciation: [aɣɾaˈmun]) is a municipality (municipi) in the comarca of the Urgell in Catalonia. It is situated in the north of the comarca, near the border with the Noguera. It has a population of 5,653 (register office, 2025). The town centre is protected as a historic-artistic monument, especially the Roman church of Santa Maria which dates from the 12th-13th centuries. The town is also known for the production of torró d'Agramunt, a sort of confectionery traditionally eaten at Christmas. The town is linked to Tàrrega by the C-240 road, to Cervera by the L-303 road and to Artesa de Segre by the L-302 road. The Urgell canal passes through the municipality, crossing the Montclar range through a tunnel. The municipality includes the exclave of Montclar d'Urgell to the north-west.

Historically, a Jewish community existed during medieval times. In 1272, Shlomo ibn Aderet mediated a dispute between the Jewish communities of Agramunt and Lérida. The Jewish and muslim communities were expelled in the 1492 expulsion of the Jews. In the 1980s, a street in the historical Jewish quarter, also called a Call (the term is thought to have originated from the word kahal in Hebrew, meaning "community"), was renamed to "carrer del Call," or "Street of the Call."

== Demography ==
1900	1930	1950	1970	1986	2007
3191	3290	3535	4428	4618	5434
