= Mont Clare station (Pennsylvania Railroad) =

Mont Clare

General information
- Coordinates: 40.137051°N 75.505273°W
- System: Former Pennsylvania Railroad station

History
- Opened: 1884

Former services
Preceding station	Pennsylvania Railroad	Following station
Phoenixville toward Pottsville	Schuylkill Branch	Port Providence toward Suburban Station
Location

Mont Clare Station was a station on the Pennsylvania Railroad's Schuylkill Branch line, in Mont Clare, Pennsylvania. The line opened in 1884 and the station closed between 1955 and 1958.

The station was originally built by the Pennsylvania Schuylkill Valley Railroad. In 1900, the Pennsylvania Railroad combined the line with five other subsidiaries to form the Schuylkill and Juniata Railroad. Two years later, the subsidiaries were eliminated and PRR took direct ownership of the line. PRR discontinued the Mont Clare station between 1955 and 1958. All service on the line was formally discontinued by Norfolk Southern Railway in 2007.
