= Joseph de Montclar =

French general (1625–1690)

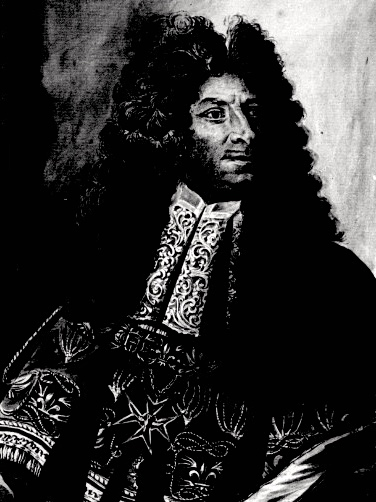
Joseph de Montclar

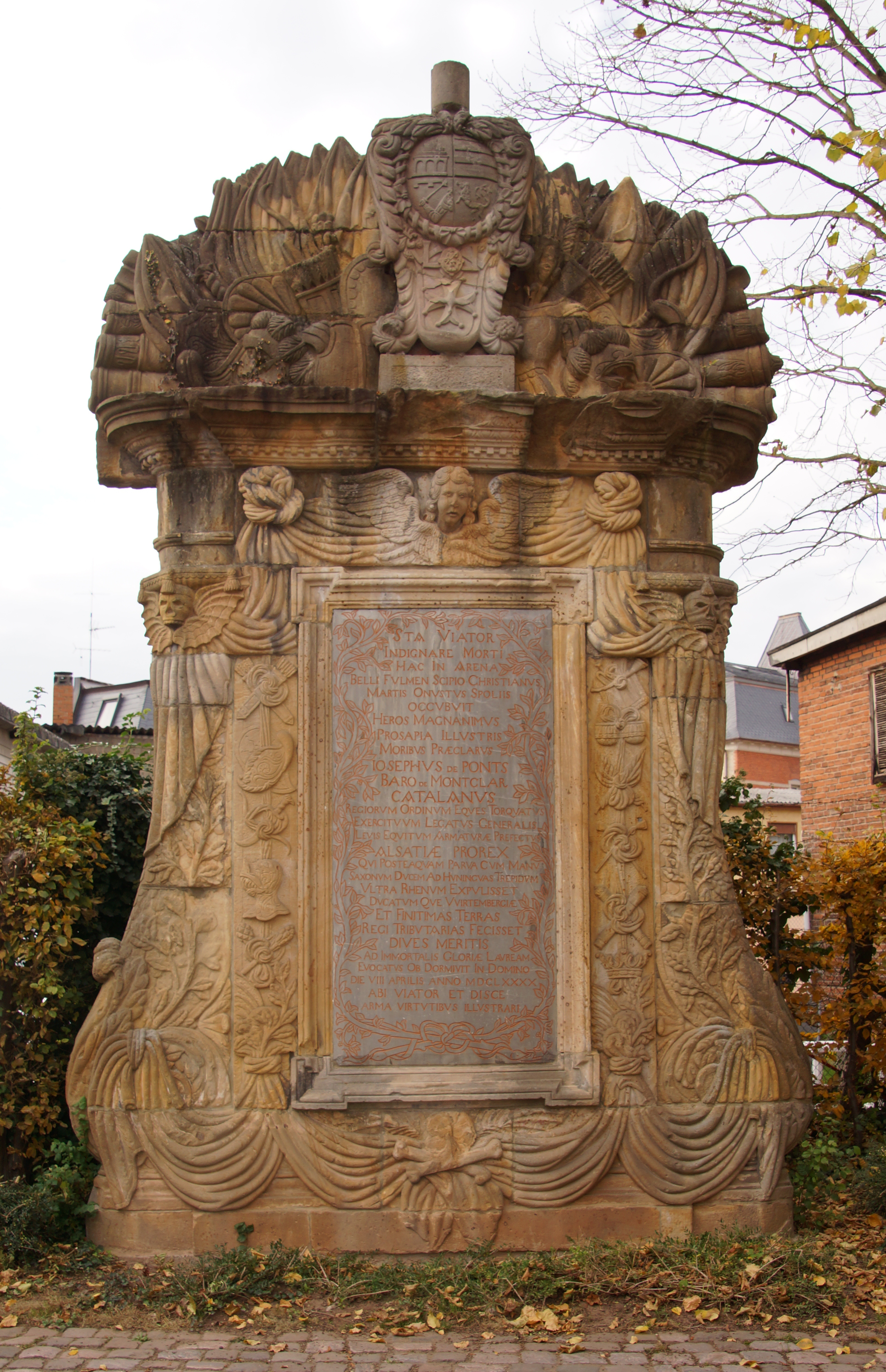
Memorial for Joseph de Pons et de Guimera, baron de Montclar, in Landau in der Pfalz (Germany)

Joseph de Pons-Guimera Baron de Montclar (1625 in Montclar – 1690 in Landau) was a French cavalry general.

Commander-in-chief of the Army of Alsace during the Franco-Dutch War, he was tasked, under the orders of Prince Louis, Grand Condé and then Marshal François de Créquy, with suppressing the strongholds that had allowed the Imperial forces to penetrate Alsace the previous year. At the end of 1676, Louis XIV and Louvois ordered the destruction of Haguenau, which Montclar carried out the following January.

Montclar was appointed lieutenant-general in 1676. In 1678, he brought the Alsatian campaign to a close by holding the positions of Illkirch and Graffenstaden. As a reward, he was appointed military governor of Alsace in 1680 and personally received the lordship of Hohlandsbourg (now Wintzenheim).

In the War of the Grand Alliance, he took part in the destruction of large parts of the Palatinate. He died in 1690.
