= USS Montclair =

Cargo ship of the United States Navy

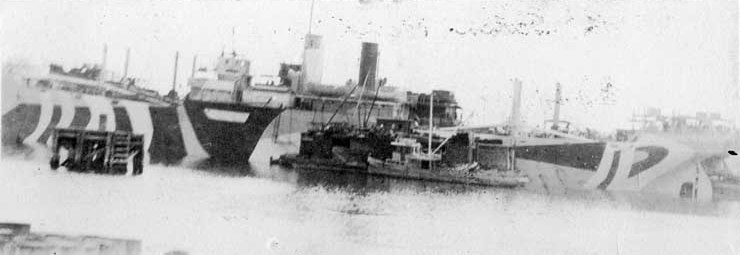
- USS Montclair (ID-3497) in port sometime between August and November 1918, painted in dazzle camouflage. Another ship, of identical topside configuration, is on her opposite side.

History

United States
- Name: USS Montclair
- Namesake: Previous name retained
- Builder: Standard Shipbuilding Corporation, Shooters Island, New York
- Launched: 30 March 1918
- Completed: 1918
- Acquired: 19 August 1918
- Commissioned: 19 August 1918
- Decommissioned: 7 July 1919
- Fate: Transferred to United States Shipping Board 7 July 1919
- Notes: Operated as SS Montclair under Shipping Board control 1919-1932; Scrapped 1937

General characteristics
- Type: Refrigerated cargo ship
- Tonnage: 4,474 Gross register tons
- Displacement: 10,562 tons (normal)
- Length: 377 ft (115 m)
- Beam: 52 ft (16 m)
- Draft: 23 ft 8 in (7.21 m)
- Propulsion: Steam engine
- Speed: 11 knots
- Complement: 70
- Armament: 1 × 4-inch (102-mm) gun; 1 × 3-inch (76.2-mm) gun

USS Montclair (ID-3497) was a United States Navy refrigerated cargo ship in commission from 1918 to 1919.

== Construction, acquisition, and commissioning ==
Montclair was built in early 1918 as the British commercial refrigerated cargo ship S.S. War Speed for the civilian trans-Atlantic passenger service, the Cunard Line by the Standard Shipbuilding Corporation at Shooters Island, New York state. The S.B.C. shipyard was actually located on the west shore of Upper New York Bay, near the North Shore of Staten Island, near the adjacent towns of Elizabeth and Bayonne, New Jersey to the west. She soon was renamed the S.S. Montclair.

On 19 August 1918, the United States Shipping Board took control of the Montclair from the British via the recently established wartime defense agency, the Emergency Fleet Corporation and moved the ship across the bay / New York Harbor to the east at the Brooklyn Navy Yard, on the East River in Brooklyn, New York City, and then immediately turned her over to the United States Navy, which then assigned her the naval registry identification number 3497 and commissioned her for defense / War duty that same day as the USS Montclair (ID-3497) for use 16 months after the United States declared war on the enemy Central Powers and entered the First World War (1914/1917-1918). But it was only just under three months before the overseas conflict ended in Europe with the Armistice of 11 November 1918.

== Operational history ==
Assigned to the Naval Overseas Transportation Service, Montclair joined a convoy out of New York City on 7 October 1918 with a cargo of refrigerated beef and a deckload of trucks, but she was unable to keep up and maintain convoy speed. Because of this and because of her machinery problems deficiencies, she was ordered to drop out of the convoy on 8 October 1918 and proceed south to Norfolk, Virginia, for repairs.

With her repairs completed, the new Montclair was directed to join up with a convoy scheduled to depart New York on 19 October 1918. She made a successful trans-Atlantic crossing this time, and arrived in Europe at Quiberon, on the western coast of Brittany in France, on 6 November 1918; she discharged her cargo at the nearby port of St. Nazaire also in Brittany that day. The world war ended while she was docked in France, only a week later on 11 November 1918, the truce / peace taking effect "at the eleventh hour, of the eleventh day, in the eleventh month".

Montclair then departed Quiberon on 14 November 1918, three days after the Armistice for a westbound voyage back to America, but after weathering a gale she was forced to put in for repairs and fuel at the British islands colony off the East Coast of the North American continent at Bermuda. She eventually arrived at the port of New York and New Jersey a month later on 15 December 1918. She then completed two more trans-Atlantic cargo runs to St. Nazaire in France and also to Rotterdam in the neutral Netherlands, completing the second of these, five months later on 20 May 1919.

In June 1919, the Montclair was directed to proceed to Galveston, Texas, on the northwest coast of the Gulf of Mexico to take on another cargo load, this time of onions, food destined for St. Nazaire. A few days out of Galveston during the voyage to St. Nazaire, it was found that the temperature and condition of the perishable food / vegetable cargo in the holds was such poor condition that decay / rotting had set in, and so Montclair was ordered to divert north to Hampton Roads harbor at Norfolk, Virginia. Upon her arrival there on 25 June 1919 it was decided with the war over, to place her in line for demobilization from the U.S. Navy service and return to civilian commercial business purposes that she was originally designed and built for two years earlier.

== Decommissioning and disposal ==
Montclair was decommissioned at Norfolk on 7 July 1919, and the Navy returned her to the U.S. Shipping Board the same day. Once again now designated S.S. Montclair, she continued to operate as a refrigerated cargo ship under the U.S. Shipping Board ownership for the next 13 years until 1932. She was stripped, dismantled and scrapped five years later at the Port of Baltimore, off the Chesapeake Bay in Baltimore, Maryland, in 1937.
