= Mount Clare, Nebraska =

Unincorporated community in Nebraska, U.S.

Coordinates: 40°10′58″N 98°13′05″W

Mount Clare is an unincorporated community in Nuckolls County, Nebraska, United States.

== History ==
A post office was established at Mount Clare in 1889, and remained in operation until it was discontinued in 1945. The community was named for both its lofty elevation, and for Clare Adams, a railroad official.

Mount Clare was located on the Missouri Pacific Railroad.
