= Montclair Elementary School =

Montclair Elementary School may refer to:

- Montclair Elementary School - Oakland Unified School District - Oakland, California
- Montclair Elementary School - Clay County School District - Orange Park, Florida
- Montclair Elementary School - Escambia County School District - Pensacola, Florida
- Montclair Elementary School - Beaverton School District - Portland, Oregon
- Montclair Elementary School - Garland Independent School District - Garland, Texas
- Montclair Elementary School - Millard Public School District - Omaha, Nebraska
