= Montclair, Davidson County, North Carolina =

Montclair, North Carolina
- Unincorporated community
- Location within the state of North Carolina
- Coordinates: 35°47′41″N 80°16′29″W
- Country: United States
- State: North Carolina
- County: Davidson
- Elevation: 745 ft (227 m)
- Time zone: UTC-5 (Eastern (EST))
  - Summer (DST): UTC-4 (EDT)
- GNIS feature ID: 1002079

Montclair is an unincorporated community in Davidson County, North Carolina. It lies at an elevation of 745 feet.
