= Montclair, Onslow County, North Carolina =

Unincorporated community in North Carolina, US

Coordinates: 34°45′34″N 77°19′40″W

Montclair is an unincorporated community in Onslow County, North Carolina, United States. It lies at an elevation of 39 feet.
