= Montclair, Cumberland County, North Carolina =

Montclair, North Carolina
- Unincorporated community
- Location within North Carolina Location within the United States
- Coordinates: 35°03′01″N 78°57′29″W
- Country: United States
- State: North Carolina
- County: Cumberland
- Elevation: 213 ft (65 m)
- Time zone: UTC-5 (Eastern (EST))
  - Summer (DST): UTC-4 (EDT)
- Area codes: 910, 472
- GNIS feature ID: 1004869

Montclair is an unincorporated community in Cumberland County, North Carolina, United States. It lies at an elevation of 217 feet (66 m).
