= Montclair, Scotland County, North Carolina =

Unincorporated community in North Carolina, US

Coordinates: 34°43′42″N 79°30′29″W

Montclair is an unincorporated community in Scotland County, North Carolina. It lies at an elevation of 213 feet (65 m).
