= Montclair, Fayetteville, North Carolina =

Coordinates: 35.0501634°N 78.9580834°W

Montclair is a neighborhood in Fayetteville, North Carolina and is located between Raeford, Cliffdale, and Skibo Roads.

== Education ==
Montclair Elementary is located in Fayetteville, in addition to 17 middle schools and 14 high schools.
