= Montclair, Wilson County, North Carolina =

Unincorporated community in North Carolina, US

Coordinates: 35°44′33″N 77°54′23″W

Montclair is an unincorporated community in Wilson County, North Carolina, United States. It lies at an elevation of 108 feet (33 m).
