= Chantesse =

- Commune
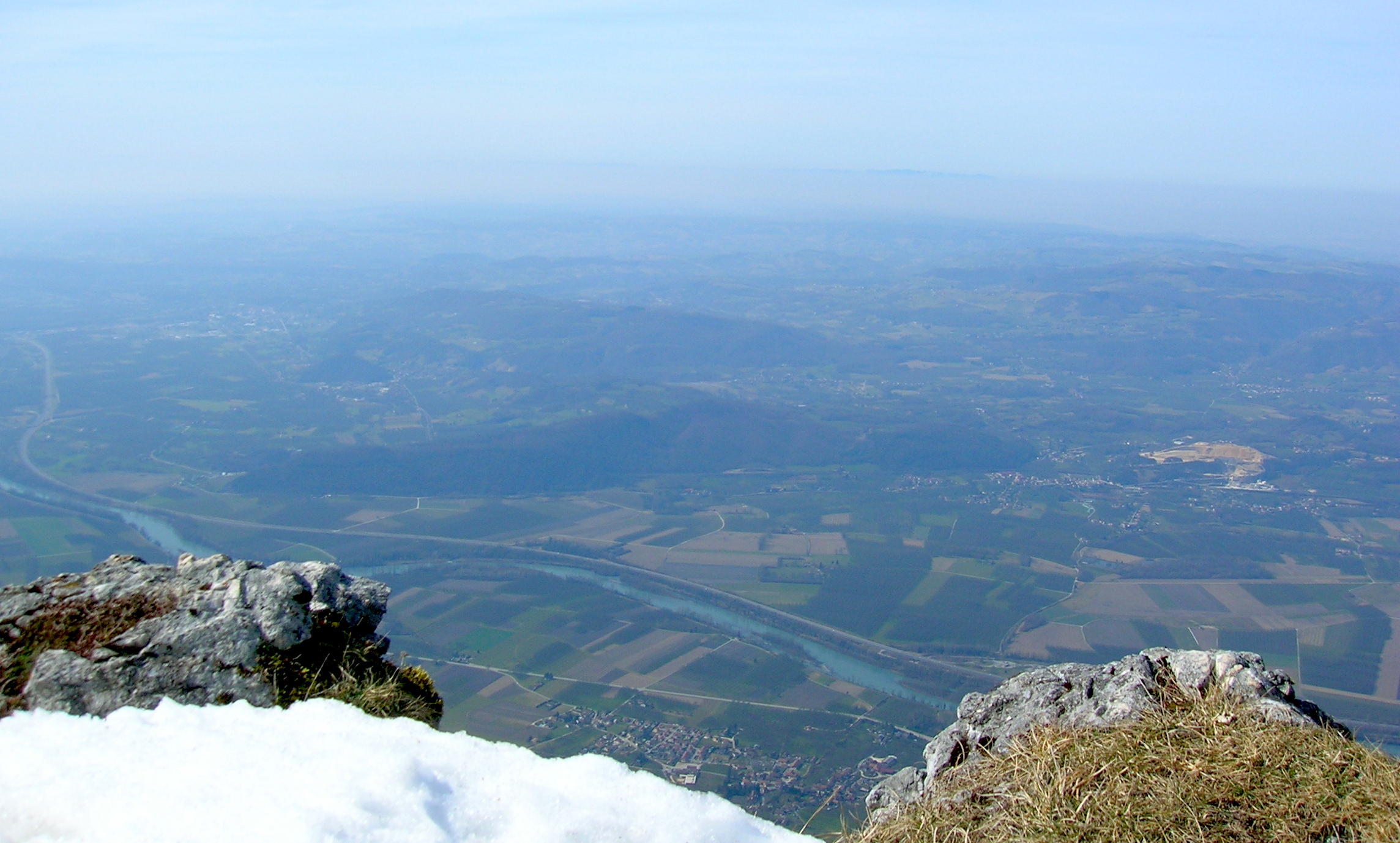
- General view from the Cheminée (Vercors) of Vinay, l'Albenc, Chantesse and Poliénas with Isère at the top, and La Rivière below.
- Location of Chantesse
- Location within France Location within Auvergne-Rhône-Alpes
- Coordinates: 45°14′37″N 5°26′42″E
- Country: France
- Region: Auvergne-Rhône-Alpes
- Department: Isère
- Arrondissement: Grenoble
- Canton: Le Sud Grésivaudan
- Intercommunality: Saint-Marcellin Vercors Isère

Government
  - Mayor (2020–2026): Isabelle Oriol
- Area^{1}: 5.83 km^{2} (2.25 sq mi)
- Highest elevation: 489 m (1,604 ft)
- Lowest elevation: 247 m (810 ft)
- Population (2023): 397
  - Density: 68.1/km^{2} (176/sq mi)
- Time zone: UTC+01:00 (CET)
  - Summer (DST): UTC+02:00 (CEST)
- INSEE/Postal code: 38074 /38470
- ^{1} French Land Register data, which excludes lakes, ponds, glaciers > 1 km^{2} (0.386 sq mi or 247 acres) and river estuaries.

Chantesse (French pronunciation: [ʃɑ̃tɛs]) is a commune in the Isère department in southeastern France.

== Population ==
Historical population
Year	Pop.	±% p.a.
1968	140	—
1975	150	+0.99%
1982	213	+5.14%
1990	262	+2.62%
1999	269	+0.29%
2007	293	+1.07%
2012	320	+1.78%
2017	337	+1.04%
2023	397	+2.77%
Source: INSEE

== See also ==
- Communes of the Isère department
