= Chasselay =

Chasselay is the name of the following communes in France:

- Chasselay, Isère, in the Isère department
- Chasselay, Rhône, in the Rhône department
