= Notre-Dame-de-l'Osier =

- Commune
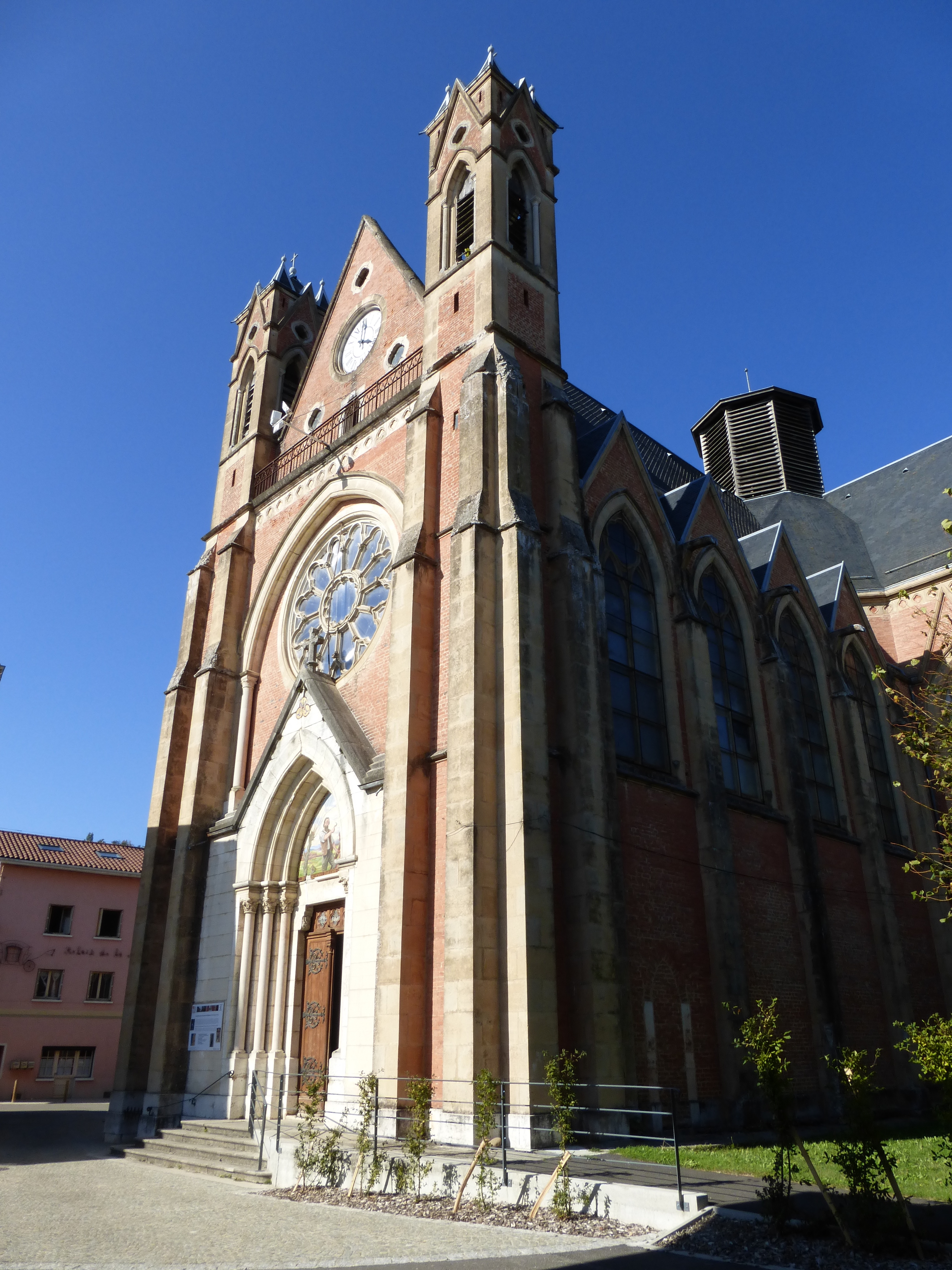
- The basilica of Notre-Dame-de-l'Osier
- Location of Notre-Dame-de-l'Osier
- Location within France Location within Auvergne-Rhône-Alpes
- Coordinates: 45°13′59″N 5°24′00″E
- Country: France
- Region: Auvergne-Rhône-Alpes
- Department: Isère
- Arrondissement: Grenoble
- Canton: Le Sud Grésivaudan

Government
  - Mayor (2020–2026): Alex Brichet-Billet
- Area^{1}: 8.38 km^{2} (3.24 sq mi)
- Population (2023): 535
  - Density: 63.8/km^{2} (165/sq mi)
- Time zone: UTC+01:00 (CET)
  - Summer (DST): UTC+02:00 (CEST)
- INSEE/Postal code: 38278 /38470
- ^{1} French Land Register data, which excludes lakes, ponds, glaciers > 1 km^{2} (0.386 sq mi or 247 acres) and river estuaries.

Notre-Dame-de-l'Osier is a commune in the Isère department in southeastern France. It is famous for being the location of a Marian apparition that took place in 1657. A church was built on the site of the apparition and completed in 1858. It became a Basilica following a decree by Pope Pius XI on 9 September 1924. Pilgrimages to the apparition site were very popular during the 19th century and the first half of the 20th century but declined in the past decades. A house of the Missionary Oblates of Mary Immaculate was established in the commune in 1834 and ceased activity in 1997. Up to 11 hotels were active in the town, welcoming pilgrims and tourists, but the last one closed down in 2001, the pilgrimage attracting less and less crowds.

Notre-Dame-de-l'Osier was a part of the neighboring commune of Vinay until it became an independent commune on 4 September 1869.

== Population ==
Historical population
Year	Pop.	±% p.a.
1968	282	—
1975	334	+2.45%
1982	310	−1.06%
1990	313	+0.12%
1999	393	+2.56%
2007	504	+3.16%
2012	480	−0.97%
2017	492	+0.50%
2023	535	+1.41%
Source: INSEE

== See also ==
- Communes of the Isère department
