= Chevrières =

Chevrières may refer to the following communes in France:

- Chevrières, Isère, in the Isère department
- Chevrières, Loire, in the Loire department
- Chevrières, Oise, in the Oise department
- Chevagny-les-Chevrières, in the Saône-et-Loire department
- Novy-Chevrières, in the Ardennes department
