= Saint-Appolinard =

Saint-Appolinard may refer to the following places in France:

- Saint-Appolinard, Isère, a commune in the Isère department
- Saint-Appolinard, Loire, a commune in the Loire department
