= Saint-Sauveur, Isère =

Saint-Sauveur
- Commune
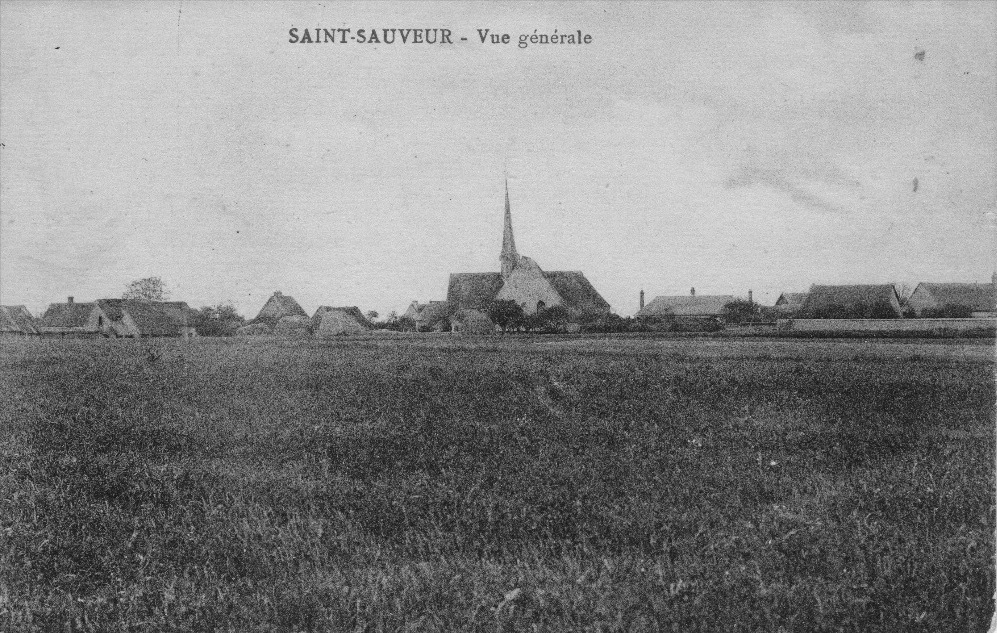
- Saint-Sauveur in 1921
- Location of Saint-Sauveur
- Location within France Location within Auvergne-Rhône-Alpes
- Coordinates: 45°09′12″N 5°20′32″E
- Country: France
- Region: Auvergne-Rhône-Alpes
- Department: Isère
- Arrondissement: Grenoble
- Canton: Le Sud Grésivaudan
- Intercommunality: Saint-Marcellin Vercors Isère

Government
  - Mayor (2020–2026): Marie-Jeanne Dabadie
- Area^{1}: 9.42 km^{2} (3.64 sq mi)
- Elevation: 276 m (906 ft)
- Highest elevation: 301 m (988 ft)
- Lowest elevation: 160 m (520 ft)
- Population (2023): 2,127
  - Density: 226/km^{2} (585/sq mi)
- Time zone: UTC+01:00 (CET)
  - Summer (DST): UTC+02:00 (CEST)
- INSEE/Postal code: 38454 /38160
- ^{1} French Land Register data, which excludes lakes, ponds, glaciers > 1 km^{2} (0.386 sq mi or 247 acres) and river estuaries.

Saint-Sauveur (French pronunciation: [sɛ̃ sovœʁ]) is a commune in the Isère department in southeastern France.

== Population ==
Historical population

Year	Pop.	±% p.a.
1793	510	—
1821	666	+0.96%
1846	757	+0.51%
1872	656	−0.55%
1901	915	+1.15%
1926	923	+0.03%
1946	827	−0.55%
1962	1,083	+1.70%
1968	1,259	+2.54%

Year	Pop.	±% p.a.
1975	1,426	+1.80%
1982	1,415	−0.11%
1990	1,481	+0.57%
1999	1,676	+1.38%
2007	1,889	+1.51%
2012	2,040	+1.55%
2017	2,098	+0.56%
2023	2,127	+0.23%

Source: EHESS and INSEE (1968-2023)

== Transport ==
There is a train station in the nearby town of Saint-Marcellin

== See also ==
- Communes of the Isère department
