= Têche =

- Commune
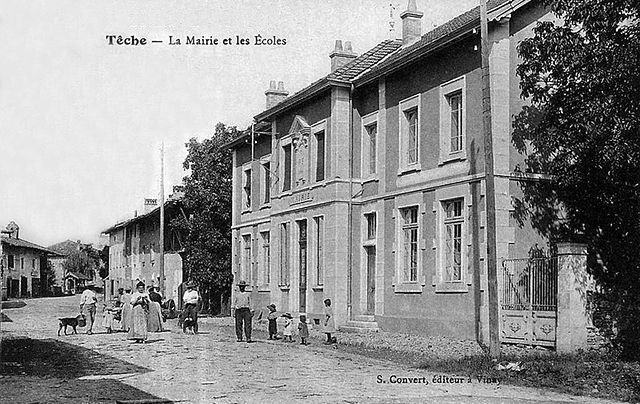
- The town hall and school at the start of the 20th century
- Location of Têche
- Location within France Location within Auvergne-Rhône-Alpes
- Coordinates: 45°11′01″N 5°22′56″E
- Country: France
- Region: Auvergne-Rhône-Alpes
- Department: Isère
- Arrondissement: Grenoble
- Canton: Le Sud Grésivaudan
- Intercommunality: Saint-Marcellin Vercors Isère

Government
  - Mayor (2020–2026): Philippe Charbonnel
- Area^{1}: 5.03 km^{2} (1.94 sq mi)
- Elevation: 259 m (850 ft)
- Highest elevation: 411 m (1,348 ft)
- Lowest elevation: 162 m (531 ft)
- Population (2023): 596
  - Density: 118/km^{2} (307/sq mi)
- Time zone: UTC+01:00 (CET)
  - Summer (DST): UTC+02:00 (CEST)
- INSEE/Postal code: 38500 /38470
- ^{1} French Land Register data, which excludes lakes, ponds, glaciers > 1 km^{2} (0.386 sq mi or 247 acres) and river estuaries.

Têche (French pronunciation: [tɛʃ]) is a commune in the Isère department in southeastern France.

== Population ==
Historical population
Year	Pop.	±% p.a.
1968	286	—
1975	301	+0.73%
1982	387	+3.66%
1990	484	+2.84%
1999	493	+0.20%
2007	524	+0.77%
2012	581	+2.09%
2017	574	−0.24%
2023	596	+0.63%
Source: INSEE

== See also ==
- Communes of the Isère department
