= Presles, Isère =

Presles
- Commune
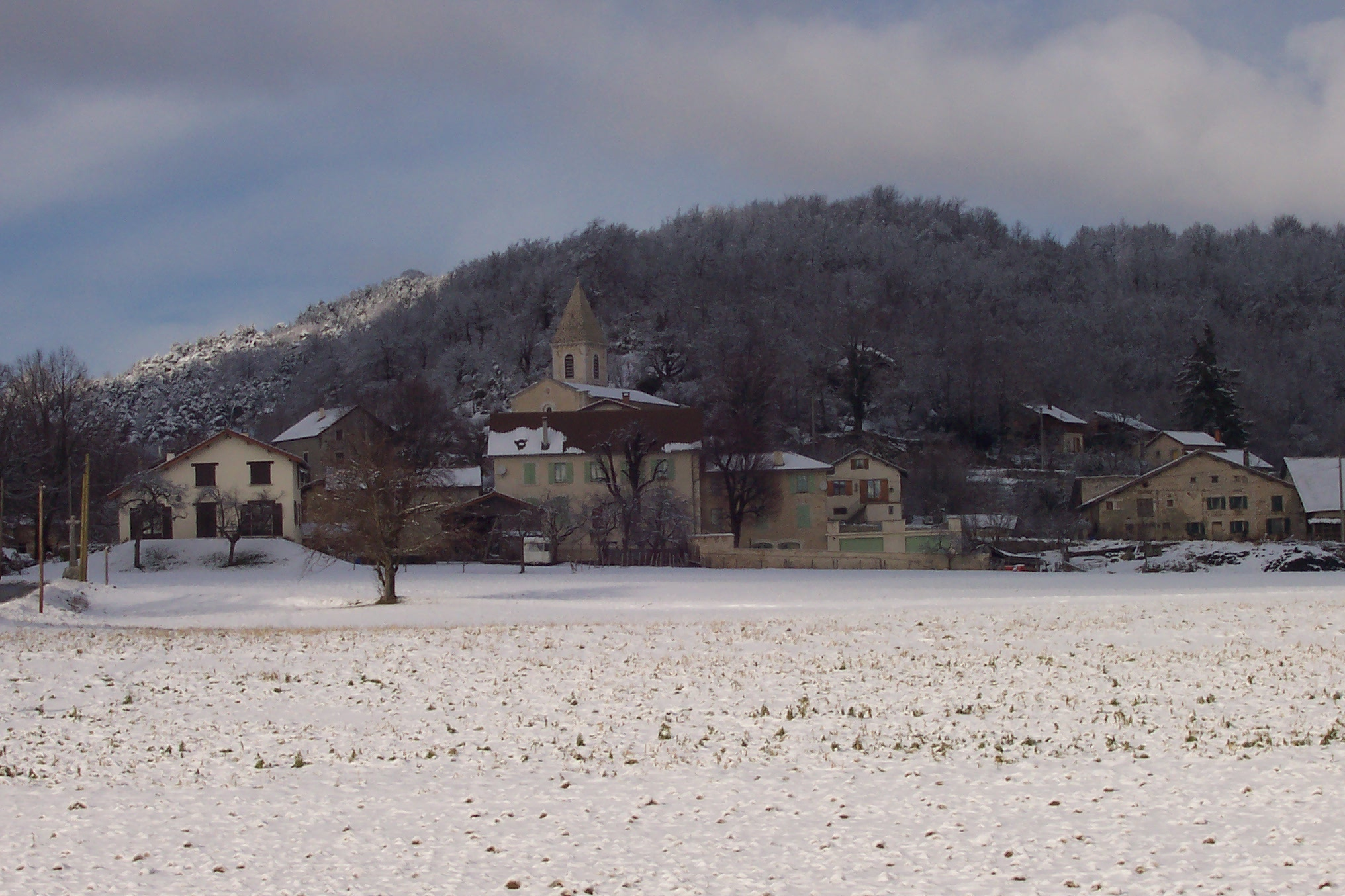
- A general view of Presles in the snow
- Location of Presles
- Location within France Location within Auvergne-Rhône-Alpes
- Coordinates: 45°05′31″N 5°23′02″E
- Country: France
- Region: Auvergne-Rhône-Alpes
- Department: Isère
- Arrondissement: Grenoble
- Canton: Le Sud Grésivaudan

Government
  - Mayor (2020–2026): Vincent Dumas
- Area^{1}: 25.68 km^{2} (9.92 sq mi)
- Highest elevation: 1,370 m (4,490 ft)
- Lowest elevation: 468 m (1,535 ft)
- Population (2023): 102
  - Density: 3.97/km^{2} (10.3/sq mi)
- Time zone: UTC+01:00 (CET)
  - Summer (DST): UTC+02:00 (CEST)
- INSEE/Postal code: 38322 /38680
- ^{1} French Land Register data, which excludes lakes, ponds, glaciers > 1 km^{2} (0.386 sq mi or 247 acres) and river estuaries.

Presles (French pronunciation: [pʁɛl]) is a commune in the Isère department in southeastern France.

== Population ==
Historical population
Year	Pop.	±% p.a.
1968	106	—
1975	77	−4.46%
1982	76	−0.19%
1990	96	+2.96%
1999	89	−0.84%
2007	102	+1.72%
2012	98	−0.80%
2017	87	−2.35%
2023	102	+2.69%
Source: INSEE

== See also ==
- Communes of the Isère department
- Parc naturel régional du Vercors
