= Montagne, Isère =

Montagne
- Commune
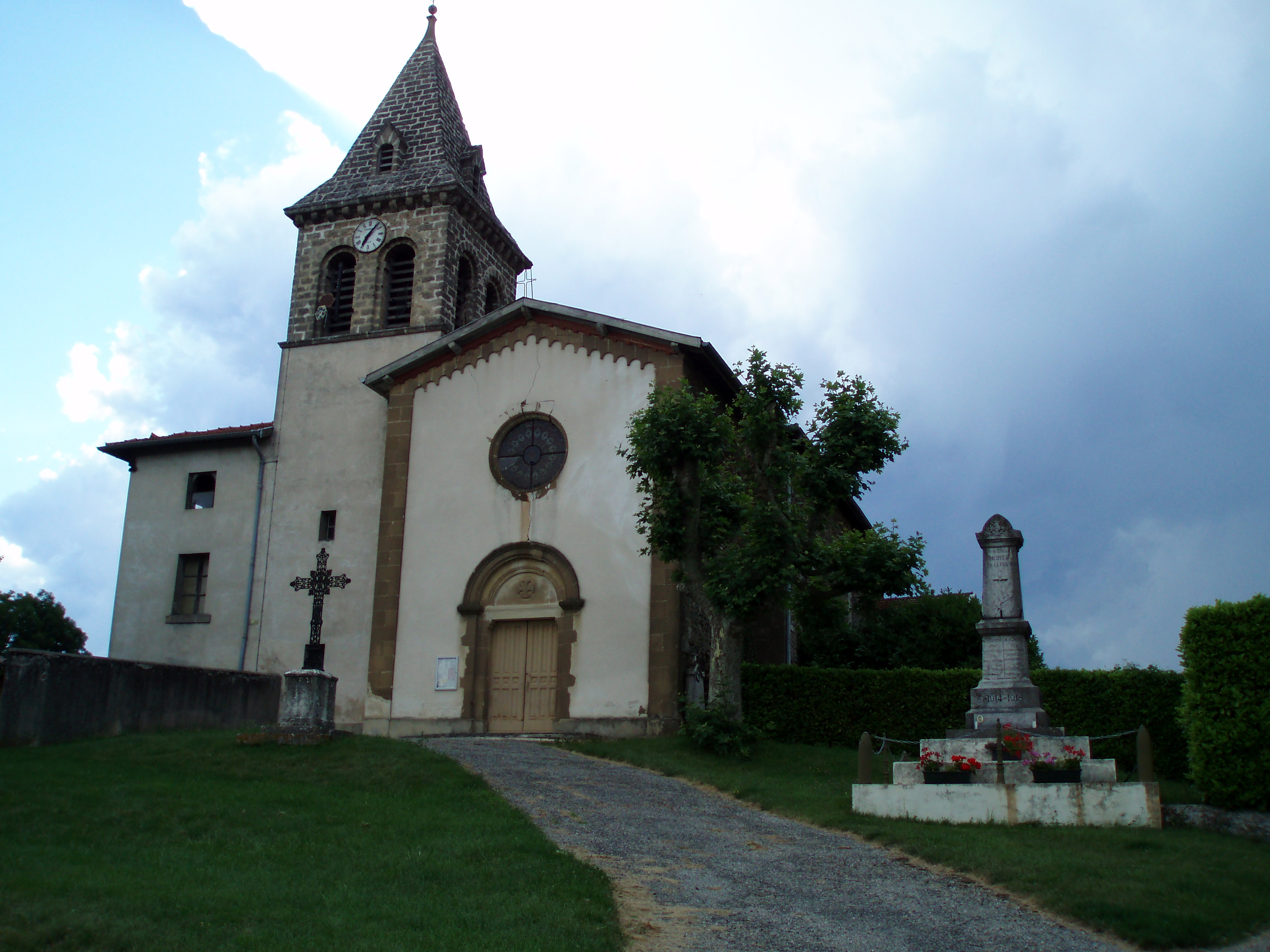
- The church of Montagne
- Location of Montagne
- Location within France Location within Auvergne-Rhône-Alpes
- Coordinates: 45°08′31″N 5°11′35″E
- Country: France
- Region: Auvergne-Rhône-Alpes
- Department: Isère
- Arrondissement: Grenoble
- Canton: Le Sud Grésivaudan

Government
  - Mayor (2020–2026): Corinne Mandier
- Area^{1}: 8.78 km^{2} (3.39 sq mi)
- Elevation: 450 m (1,480 ft)
- Highest elevation: 560 m (1,840 ft)
- Lowest elevation: 259 m (850 ft)
- Population (2023): 273
  - Density: 31.1/km^{2} (80.5/sq mi)
- Time zone: UTC+01:00 (CET)
  - Summer (DST): UTC+02:00 (CEST)
- INSEE/Postal code: 38245 /38160
- ^{1} French Land Register data, which excludes lakes, ponds, glaciers > 1 km^{2} (0.386 sq mi or 247 acres) and river estuaries.

Montagne (French pronunciation: [mɔ̃taɲ]) is a commune in the Isère department in southeastern France.

== Population ==
Historical population
Year	Pop.	±% p.a.
1968	221	—
1975	218	−0.20%
1982	204	−0.94%
1990	223	+1.12%
1999	249	+1.23%
2007	259	+0.49%
2012	265	+0.46%
2017	266	+0.08%
2023	273	+0.43%
Source: INSEE

== See also ==
- Communes of the Isère department
