= Serre-Nerpol =

- Commune
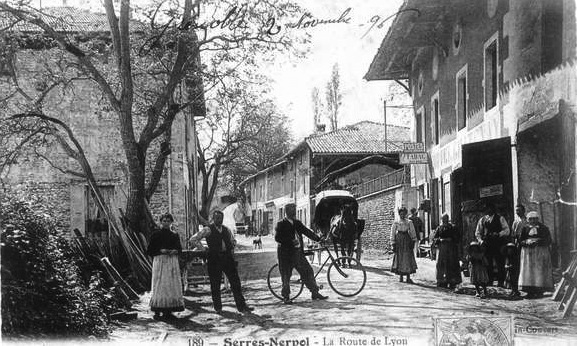
- Serre-Nerpol in 1896

- Coat of arms
- Location of Serre-Nerpol
- Location within France Location within Auvergne-Rhône-Alpes
- Coordinates: 45°15′32″N 5°22′33″E
- Country: France
- Region: Auvergne-Rhône-Alpes
- Department: Isère
- Arrondissement: Grenoble
- Canton: Le Sud Grésivaudan

Government
  - Mayor (2020–2026): Alain Rousset
- Area^{1}: 13.16 km^{2} (5.08 sq mi)
- Elevation: 400 m (1,300 ft)
- Highest elevation: 720 m (2,360 ft)
- Lowest elevation: 340 m (1,120 ft)
- Population (2023): 307
  - Density: 23.3/km^{2} (60.4/sq mi)
- Time zone: UTC+01:00 (CET)
  - Summer (DST): UTC+02:00 (CEST)
- INSEE/Postal code: 38275 /38470
- ^{1} French Land Register data, which excludes lakes, ponds, glaciers > 1 km^{2} (0.386 sq mi or 247 acres) and river estuaries.

Serre-Nerpol (French pronunciation: [sɛʁ nɛʁpɔl]) is a commune in the Isère department in southeastern France.

== Population ==
Historical population
Year	Pop.	±% p.a.
1968	266	—
1975	229	−2.12%
1982	252	+1.38%
1990	269	+0.82%
1999	284	+0.60%
2007	290	+0.26%
2012	299	+0.61%
2017	296	−0.20%
2023	307	+0.61%
Source: INSEE

== See also ==
- Communes of the Isère department
