= Cras, Isère =

Cras
- Commune
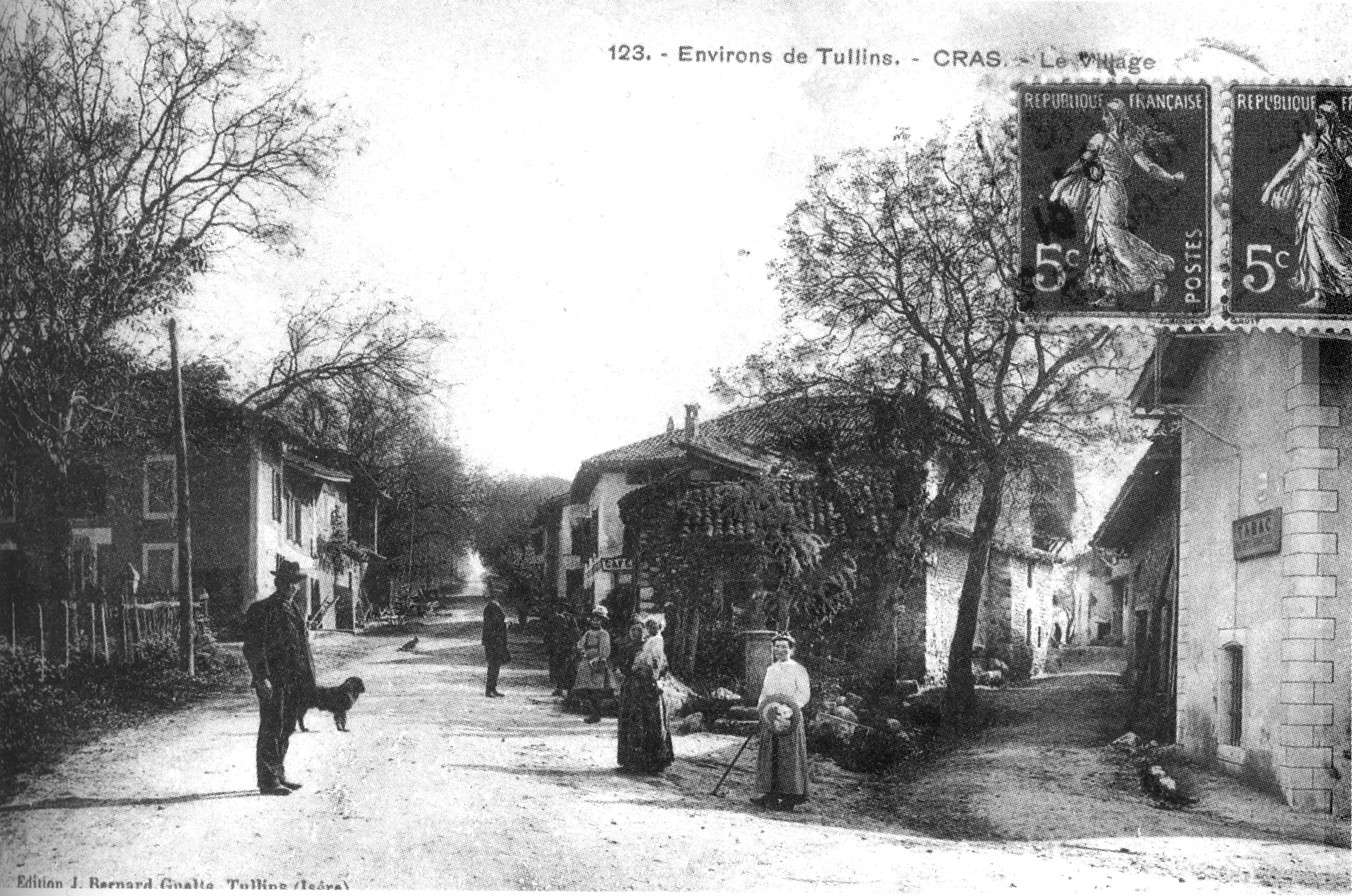
- Cras in 1912
- Location of Cras
- Location within France Location within Auvergne-Rhône-Alpes
- Coordinates: 45°16′11″N 5°27′03″E
- Country: France
- Region: Auvergne-Rhône-Alpes
- Department: Isère
- Arrondissement: Grenoble
- Canton: Le Sud Grésivaudan

Government
  - Mayor (2020–2026): Nicole Di Maria
- Area^{1}: 5.43 km^{2} (2.10 sq mi)
- Highest elevation: 773 m (2,536 ft)
- Lowest elevation: 280 m (920 ft)
- Population (2023): 407
  - Density: 75.0/km^{2} (194/sq mi)
- Time zone: UTC+01:00 (CET)
  - Summer (DST): UTC+02:00 (CEST)
- INSEE/Postal code: 38137 /38210
- ^{1} French Land Register data, which excludes lakes, ponds, glaciers > 1 km^{2} (0.386 sq mi or 247 acres) and river estuaries.

Cras is a commune in the Isère department in southeastern France.

== Population ==
Historical population
Year	Pop.	±% p.a.
1968	210	—
1975	208	−0.14%
1982	206	−0.14%
1990	223	+1.00%
1999	325	+4.27%
2007	420	+3.26%
2012	461	+1.88%
2017	438	−1.02%
2023	407	−1.22%
Source: INSEE

== See also ==
- Communes of the Isère department
