= Murinais =

- Commune
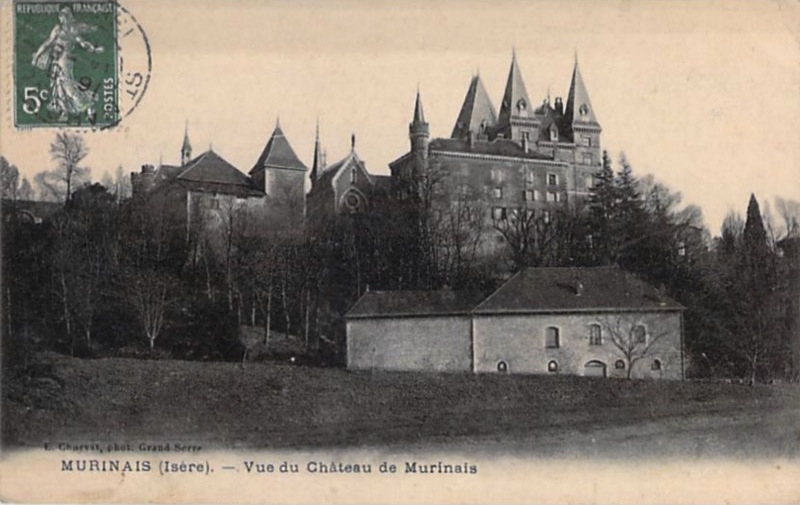
- The chateau of Murinais at the start of the 20th century
- Location of Murinais
- Location within France Location within Auvergne-Rhône-Alpes
- Coordinates: 45°12′50″N 5°18′57″E
- Country: France
- Region: Auvergne-Rhône-Alpes
- Department: Isère
- Arrondissement: Grenoble
- Canton: Le Sud Grésivaudan

Government
  - Mayor (2020–2026): Patrice Iserable
- Area^{1}: 8.22 km^{2} (3.17 sq mi)
- Highest elevation: 667 m (2,188 ft)
- Lowest elevation: 345 m (1,132 ft)
- Population (2023): 412
  - Density: 50.1/km^{2} (130/sq mi)
- Time zone: UTC+01:00 (CET)
  - Summer (DST): UTC+02:00 (CEST)
- INSEE/Postal code: 38272 /38160
- ^{1} French Land Register data, which excludes lakes, ponds, glaciers > 1 km^{2} (0.386 sq mi or 247 acres) and river estuaries.

Murinais (French pronunciation: [myʁinɛ]) is a commune in the Isère department in southeastern France.

== Population ==
Historical population
Year	Pop.	±% p.a.
1968	260	—
1975	264	+0.22%
1982	282	+0.95%
1990	311	+1.23%
1999	340	+1.00%
2007	380	+1.40%
2012	379	−0.05%
2017	397	+0.93%
2023	412	+0.62%
Source: INSEE

== See also ==
- Communes of the Isère department
