= Morette =

- Commune
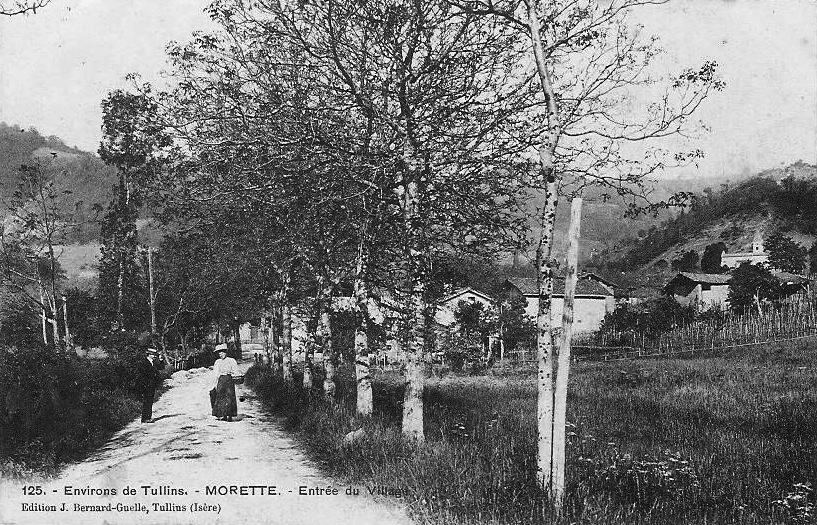
- Morette at the start of the 20th century
- Location of Morette
- Location within France Location within Auvergne-Rhône-Alpes
- Coordinates: 45°17′11″N 5°27′10″E
- Country: France
- Region: Auvergne-Rhône-Alpes
- Department: Isère
- Arrondissement: Grenoble
- Canton: Le Sud Grésivaudan

Government
  - Mayor (2020–2026): Franck Doriol
- Area^{1}: 6.27 km^{2} (2.42 sq mi)
- Elevation: 380 m (1,250 ft)
- Highest elevation: 761 m (2,497 ft)
- Lowest elevation: 280 m (920 ft)
- Population (2023): 358
  - Density: 57.1/km^{2} (148/sq mi)
- Time zone: UTC+01:00 (CET)
  - Summer (DST): UTC+02:00 (CEST)
- INSEE/Postal code: 38263 /38210
- ^{1} French Land Register data, which excludes lakes, ponds, glaciers > 1 km^{2} (0.386 sq mi or 247 acres) and river estuaries.

Morette (French pronunciation: [mɔʁɛt]) is a commune in the Isère department in southeastern France.

== Population ==
Historical population
Year	Pop.	±% p.a.
1968	218	—
1975	252	+2.09%
1982	288	+1.93%
1990	322	+1.40%
1999	361	+1.28%
2007	399	+1.26%
2012	399	+0.00%
2017	428	+1.41%
2023	358	−2.93%
Source: INSEE

== See also ==
- Communes of the Isère department
