= Rovon =

- Commune
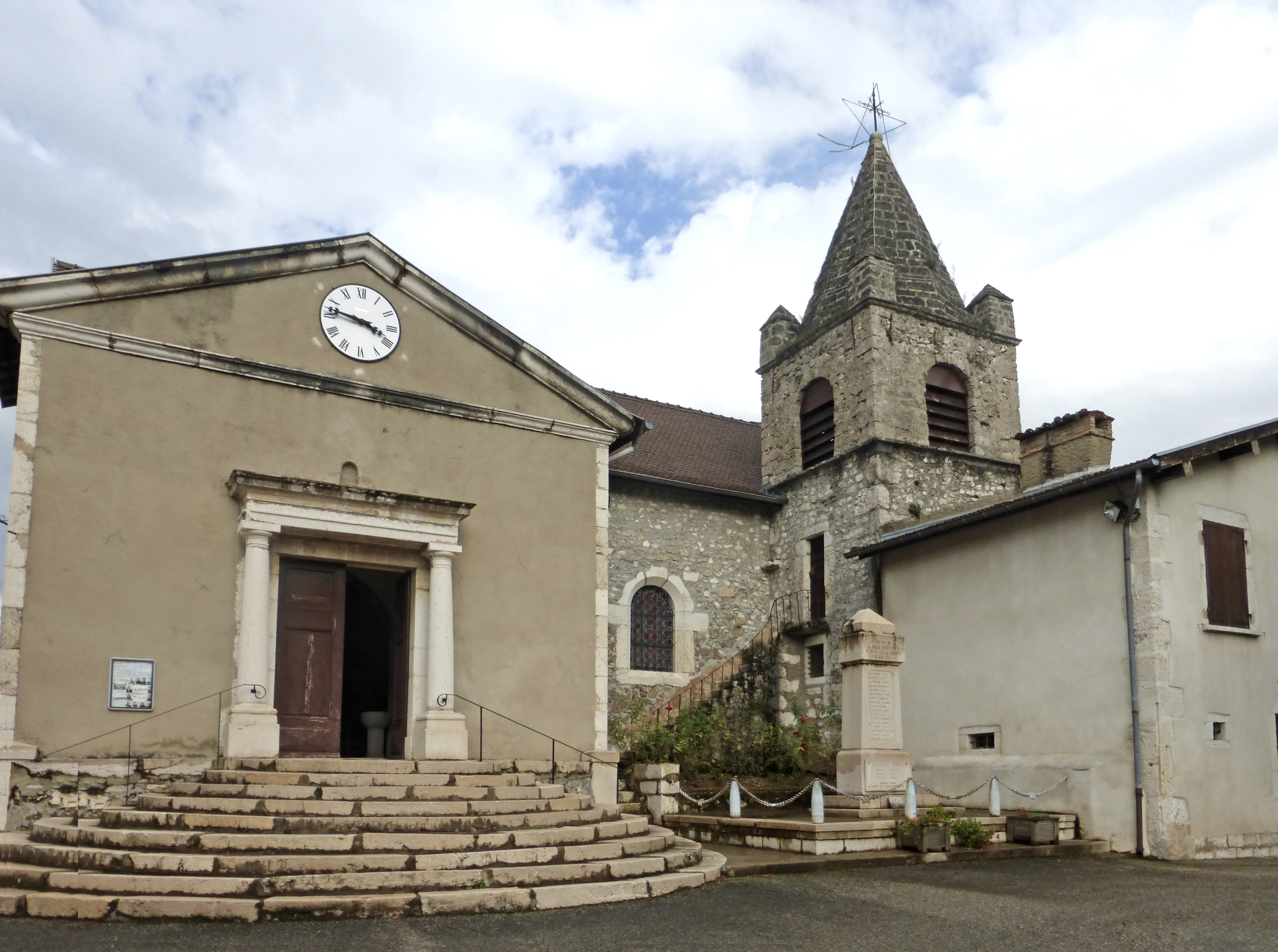
- The church of Rovon

- Coat of arms
- Location of Rovon
- Location within France Location within Auvergne-Rhône-Alpes
- Coordinates: 45°12′12″N 5°27′43″E
- Country: France
- Region: Auvergne-Rhône-Alpes
- Department: Isère
- Arrondissement: Grenoble
- Canton: Le Sud Grésivaudan

Government
  - Mayor (2020–2026): Béatrice Genin
- Area^{1}: 11.82 km^{2} (4.56 sq mi)
- Highest elevation: 1,471 m (4,826 ft)
- Lowest elevation: 172 m (564 ft)
- Population (2023): 605
  - Density: 51.2/km^{2} (133/sq mi)
- Time zone: UTC+01:00 (CET)
  - Summer (DST): UTC+02:00 (CEST)
- INSEE/Postal code: 38345 /38470
- ^{1} French Land Register data, which excludes lakes, ponds, glaciers > 1 km^{2} (0.386 sq mi or 247 acres) and river estuaries.

Rovon (French pronunciation: [ʁɔvɔ̃]) is a commune in the Isère department in southeastern France.

== Population ==
Historical population
| Year | Pop. | ±% p.a. |
|---|---|---|
| 1968 | 262 | — |
| 1975 | 274 | +0.64% |
| 1982 | 310 | +1.78% |
| 1990 | 424 | +3.99% |
| 1999 | 532 | +2.55% |
| 2007 | 584 | +1.17% |
| 2012 | 599 | +0.51% |
| 2017 | 609 | +0.33% |
| 2023 | 605 | −0.11% |
Source: INSEE

== See also ==
- Communes of the Isère department
- Parc naturel régional du Vercors
