= Beauvoir-en-Royans =

- Commune
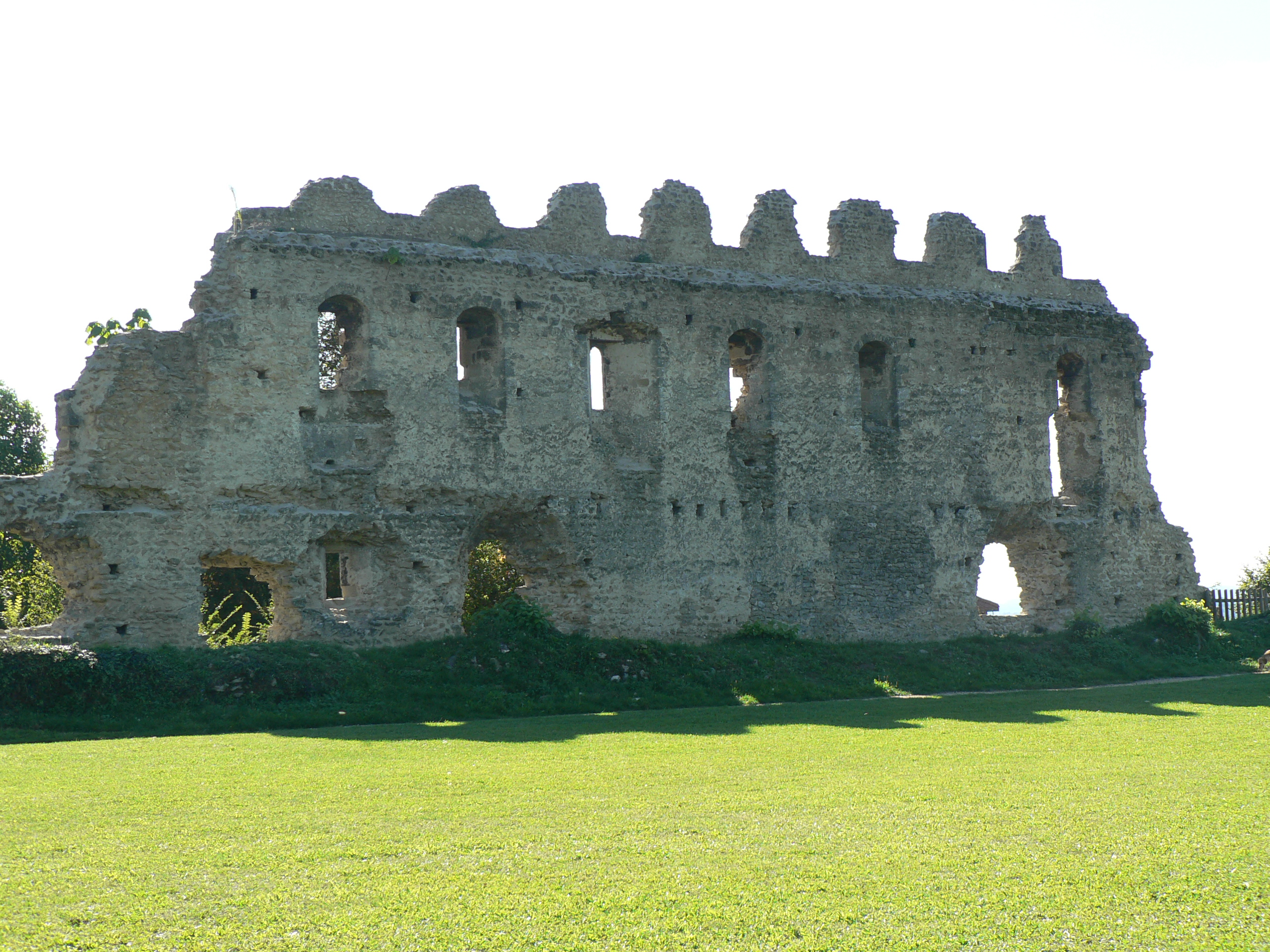
- Ruins of the Chateau of Beauvoir
- Location of Beauvoir-en-Royans
- Location within France Location within Auvergne-Rhône-Alpes
- Coordinates: 45°07′18″N 5°20′20″E
- Country: France
- Region: Auvergne-Rhône-Alpes
- Department: Isère
- Arrondissement: Grenoble
- Canton: Le Sud Grésivaudan
- Intercommunality: Saint-Marcellin Vercors Isère

Government
  - Mayor (2020–2026): Natacha Petter
- Area^{1}: 2.1 km^{2} (0.81 sq mi)
- Elevation: 281 m (922 ft)
- Highest elevation: 606 m (1,988 ft)
- Lowest elevation: 160 m (520 ft)
- Population (2023): 96
  - Density: 46/km^{2} (120/sq mi)
- Time zone: UTC+01:00 (CET)
  - Summer (DST): UTC+02:00 (CEST)
- INSEE/Postal code: 38036 /38160
- ^{1} French Land Register data, which excludes lakes, ponds, glaciers > 1 km^{2} (0.386 sq mi or 247 acres) and river estuaries.

Beauvoir-en-Royans is a commune in the Isère department in southeastern France.

== Population ==
Historical population
Year	Pop.	±% p.a.
1968	63	—
1975	43	−5.31%
1982	66	+6.31%
1990	59	−1.39%
1999	70	+1.92%
2007	70	+0.00%
2012	82	+3.22%
2017	92	+2.33%
2023	96	+0.71%
Source: INSEE

== See also ==
- Communes of the Isère department
- Parc naturel régional du Vercors
