= Saint-Just-de-Claix =

- Commune
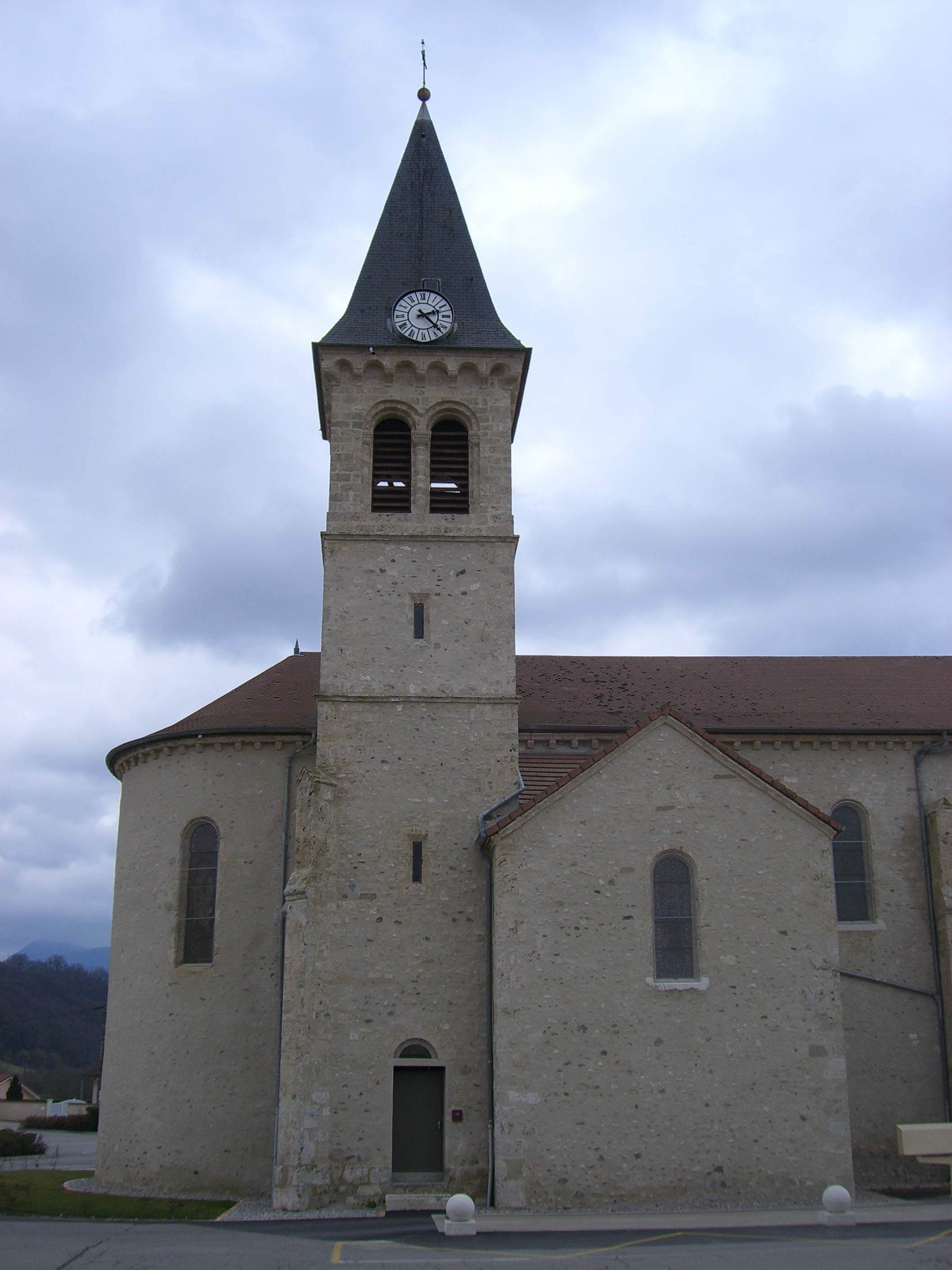
- The church of Saint-Just-de-Claix
- Location of Saint-Just-de-Claix
- Location within France Location within Auvergne-Rhône-Alpes
- Coordinates: 45°04′32″N 5°17′05″E
- Country: France
- Region: Auvergne-Rhône-Alpes
- Department: Isère
- Arrondissement: Grenoble
- Canton: Le Sud Grésivaudan

Government
  - Mayor (2020–2026): Joël O'Baton
- Area^{1}: 11.59 km^{2} (4.47 sq mi)
- Elevation: 209 m (686 ft)
- Highest elevation: 320 m (1,050 ft)
- Lowest elevation: 160 m (520 ft)
- Population (2023): 1,401
  - Density: 120.9/km^{2} (313.1/sq mi)
- Time zone: UTC+01:00 (CET)
  - Summer (DST): UTC+02:00 (CEST)
- INSEE/Postal code: 38409 /38680
- ^{1} French Land Register data, which excludes lakes, ponds, glaciers > 1 km^{2} (0.386 sq mi or 247 acres) and river estuaries.

Saint-Just-de-Claix (French pronunciation: [sɛ̃ ʒy(st) də klɛ]; Occitan: Sent Just de Clais) is a commune in the Isère department in southeastern France.

== Population ==
Historical population
| Year | Pop. | ±% p.a. |
|---|---|---|
| 1968 | 580 | — |
| 1975 | 556 | −0.60% |
| 1982 | 822 | +5.74% |
| 1990 | 944 | +1.74% |
| 1999 | 1,025 | +0.92% |
| 2007 | 1,175 | +1.72% |
| 2012 | 1,230 | +0.92% |
| 2017 | 1,212 | −0.29% |
| 2023 | 1,401 | +2.44% |
Source: INSEE

== See also ==
- Communes of the Isère department
- Parc naturel régional du Vercors
