= Vatilieu =

- Commune
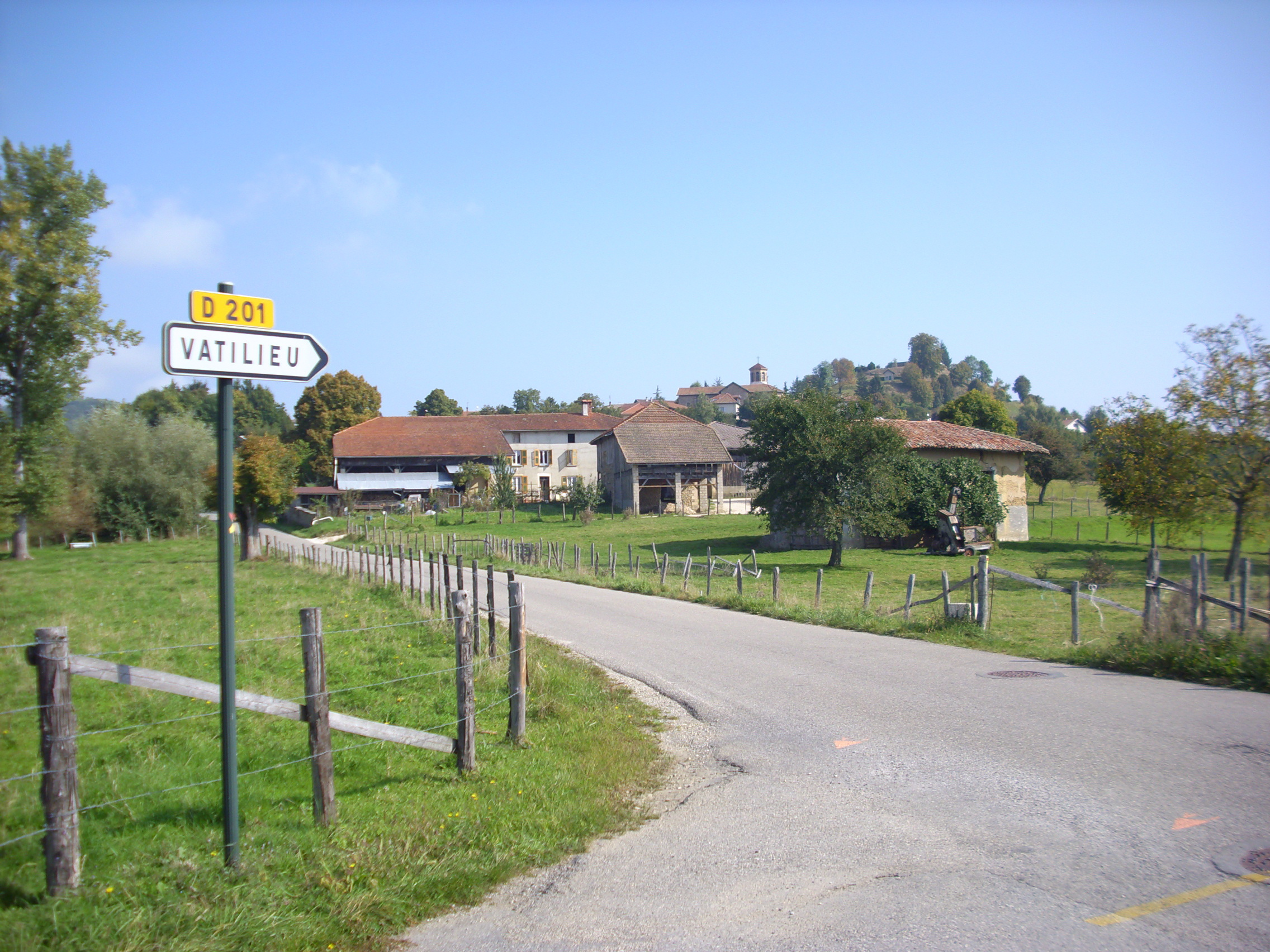
- The road into Vatilieu
- Location of Vatilieu
- Location within France Location within Auvergne-Rhône-Alpes
- Coordinates: 45°15′25″N 5°24′41″E
- Country: France
- Region: Auvergne-Rhône-Alpes
- Department: Isère
- Arrondissement: Grenoble
- Canton: Le Sud Grésivaudan
- Intercommunality: Saint-Marcellin Vercors Isère

Government
  - Mayor (2020–2026): Gaëtan Roux-Bernard
- Area^{1}: 9.22 km^{2} (3.56 sq mi)
- Elevation: 560 m (1,840 ft)
- Highest elevation: 787 m (2,582 ft)
- Lowest elevation: 352 m (1,155 ft)
- Population (2023): 373
  - Density: 40.5/km^{2} (105/sq mi)
- Time zone: UTC+01:00 (CET)
  - Summer (DST): UTC+02:00 (CEST)
- INSEE/Postal code: 38526 /38470
- ^{1} French Land Register data, which excludes lakes, ponds, glaciers > 1 km^{2} (0.386 sq mi or 247 acres) and river estuaries.

Vatilieu (French pronunciation: [vatiljø]) is a commune in the Isère department in southeastern France.

== Population ==
Historical population
Year	Pop.	±% p.a.
1968	203	—
1975	165	−2.92%
1982	265	+7.00%
1990	315	+2.18%
1999	339	+0.82%
2007	373	+1.20%
2012	371	−0.11%
2017	365	−0.33%
2023	373	+0.36%
Source: INSEE

== See also ==
- Communes of the Isère department
