= Varacieux =

- Commune
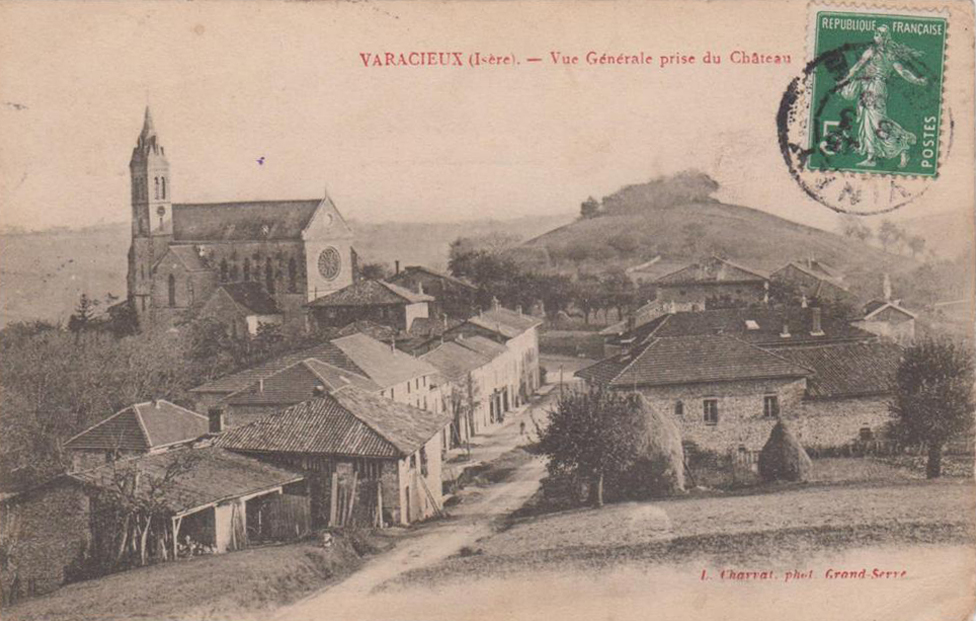
- Varacieux at the start of the 20th century
- Location of Varacieux
- Location within France Location within Auvergne-Rhône-Alpes
- Coordinates: 45°13′58″N 5°20′18″E
- Country: France
- Region: Auvergne-Rhône-Alpes
- Department: Isère
- Arrondissement: Grenoble
- Canton: Le Sud Grésivaudan

Government
  - Mayor (2020–2026): Denis Chevallier
- Area^{1}: 18.48 km^{2} (7.14 sq mi)
- Elevation: 418 m (1,371 ft)
- Highest elevation: 704 m (2,310 ft)
- Lowest elevation: 326 m (1,070 ft)
- Population (2023): 881
  - Density: 47.7/km^{2} (123/sq mi)
- Time zone: UTC+01:00 (CET)
  - Summer (DST): UTC+02:00 (CEST)
- INSEE/Postal code: 38523 /38470
- ^{1} French Land Register data, which excludes lakes, ponds, glaciers > 1 km^{2} (0.386 sq mi or 247 acres) and river estuaries.

Varacieux (French pronunciation: [vaʁasjø]) is a commune in the Isère department in southeastern France.

== Population ==
Historical population
Year	Pop.	±% p.a.
1968	691	—
1975	661	−0.63%
1982	716	+1.15%
1990	682	−0.61%
1999	643	−0.65%
2007	764	+2.18%
2012	854	+2.25%
2017	854	+0.00%
2023	881	+0.52%
Source: INSEE

== See also ==
- Communes of the Isère department
