= Châtelus, Isère =

Châtelus
- Commune
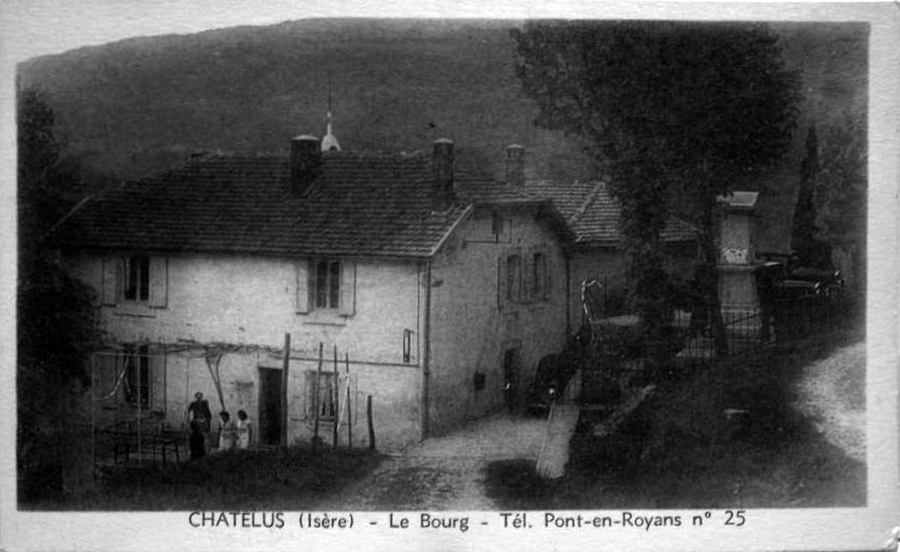
- Châtelus at the start of the 20th century
- Location of Châtelus
- Location within France Location within Auvergne-Rhône-Alpes
- Coordinates: 45°03′32″N 5°22′24″E
- Country: France
- Region: Auvergne-Rhône-Alpes
- Department: Isère
- Arrondissement: Grenoble
- Canton: Le Sud Grésivaudan

Government
  - Mayor (2020–2026): William Thumy
- Area^{1}: 12.3 km^{2} (4.7 sq mi)
- Elevation: 480 m (1,570 ft)
- Highest elevation: 1,269 m (4,163 ft)
- Lowest elevation: 229 m (751 ft)
- Population (2023): 97
  - Density: 7.9/km^{2} (20/sq mi)
- Time zone: UTC+01:00 (CET)
  - Summer (DST): UTC+02:00 (CEST)
- INSEE/Postal code: 38092 /38680
- ^{1} French Land Register data, which excludes lakes, ponds, glaciers > 1 km^{2} (0.386 sq mi or 247 acres) and river estuaries.

Châtelus is a commune in the Isère department in southeastern France.

== Population ==
Historical population
Year	Pop.	±% p.a.
1968	144	—
1975	95	−5.77%
1982	70	−4.27%
1990	84	+2.31%
1999	94	+1.26%
2007	85	−1.25%
2012	89	+0.92%
2017	88	−0.23%
2023	97	+1.64%
Source: INSEE

== See also ==
- Communes of the Isère department
- Parc naturel régional du Vercors
