= Rencurel =

- Commune
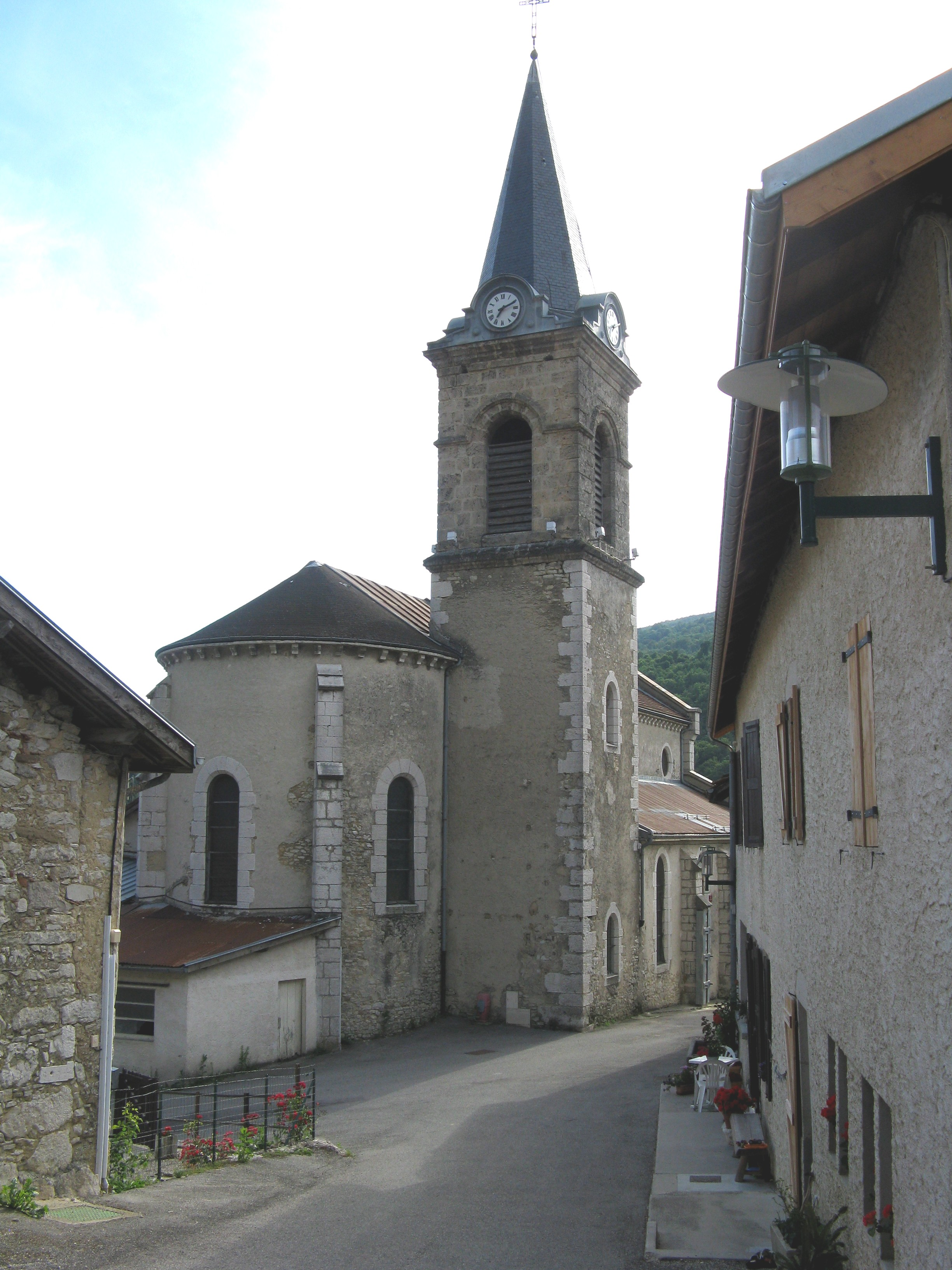
- The church of Rencurel
- Location of Rencurel
- Location within France Location within Auvergne-Rhône-Alpes
- Coordinates: 45°06′09″N 5°28′24″E
- Country: France
- Region: Auvergne-Rhône-Alpes
- Department: Isère
- Arrondissement: Grenoble
- Canton: Le Sud Grésivaudan
- Intercommunality: Saint-Marcellin Vercors Isère

Government
  - Mayor (2024–2026): Olivier Dutel
- Area^{1}: 35 km^{2} (14 sq mi)
- Highest elevation: 1,150 m (3,770 ft)
- Lowest elevation: 650 m (2,130 ft)
- Population (2023): 358
  - Density: 10/km^{2} (26/sq mi)
- Time zone: UTC+01:00 (CET)
  - Summer (DST): UTC+02:00 (CEST)
- INSEE/Postal code: 38333 /38680
- ^{1} French Land Register data, which excludes lakes, ponds, glaciers > 1 km^{2} (0.386 sq mi or 247 acres) and river estuaries.

Rencurel (French pronunciation: [ʁɑ̃kyʁɛl]) is a commune in the Isère department in southeastern France.

== Population ==
Historical population
Year	Pop.	±% p.a.
1968	365	—
1975	310	−2.31%
1982	292	−0.85%
1990	270	−0.97%
1999	298	+1.10%
2007	310	+0.49%
2012	301	−0.59%
2017	322	+1.36%
2023	358	+1.78%
Source: INSEE

== See also ==
- Communes of the Isère department
- Parc naturel régional du Vercors
