= Bessins =

- Commune
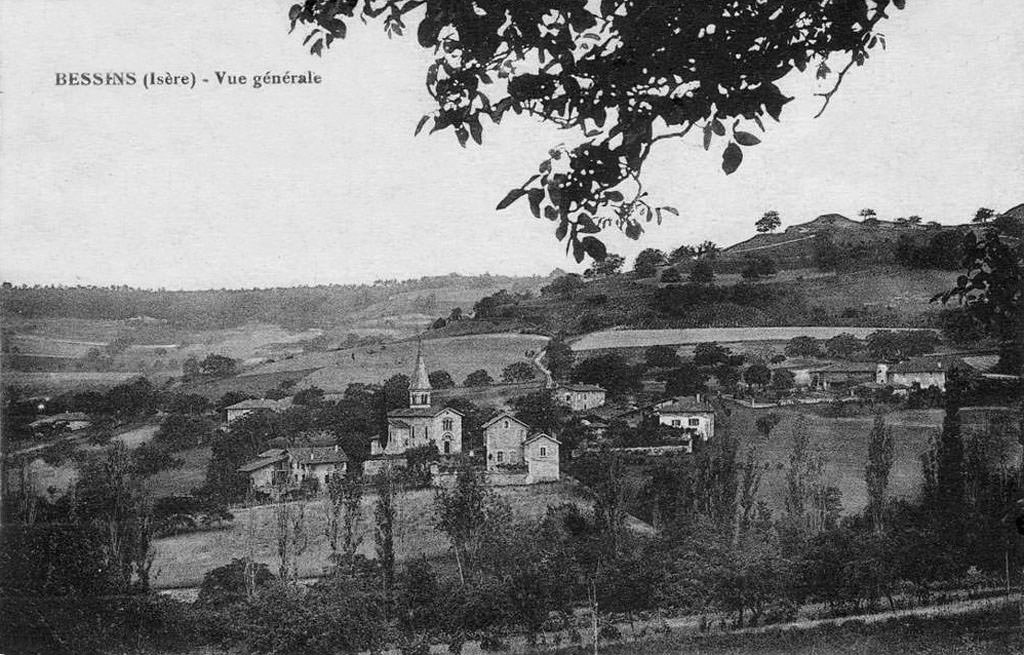
- A general view of Bessins, at the beginning of the 20th century
- Location of Bessins
- Location within France Location within Auvergne-Rhône-Alpes
- Coordinates: 45°12′12″N 5°15′56″E
- Country: France
- Region: Auvergne-Rhône-Alpes
- Department: Isère
- Arrondissement: Grenoble
- Canton: Le Sud Grésivaudan

Government
  - Mayor (2020–2026): Aimé Lambert
- Area^{1}: 4.65 km^{2} (1.80 sq mi)
- Elevation: 450 m (1,480 ft)
- Highest elevation: 650 m (2,130 ft)
- Lowest elevation: 405 m (1,329 ft)
- Population (2023): 123
  - Density: 26.5/km^{2} (68.5/sq mi)
- Time zone: UTC+01:00 (CET)
  - Summer (DST): UTC+02:00 (CEST)
- INSEE/Postal code: 38041 /38160
- ^{1} French Land Register data, which excludes lakes, ponds, glaciers > 1 km^{2} (0.386 sq mi or 247 acres) and river estuaries.

Bessins (French pronunciation: [bɛsɛ̃]) is a commune in the Isère department in southeastern France.

== Population ==
Historical population
Year	Pop.	±% p.a.
1968	126	—
1975	124	−0.23%
1982	101	−2.89%
1990	90	−1.43%
1999	107	+1.94%
2007	126	+2.06%
2012	127	+0.16%
2017	116	−1.80%
2023	123	+0.98%
Source: INSEE

== See also ==
- Communes of the Isère department
