= Saint-Vérand, Isère =

Saint-Vérand
- Commune
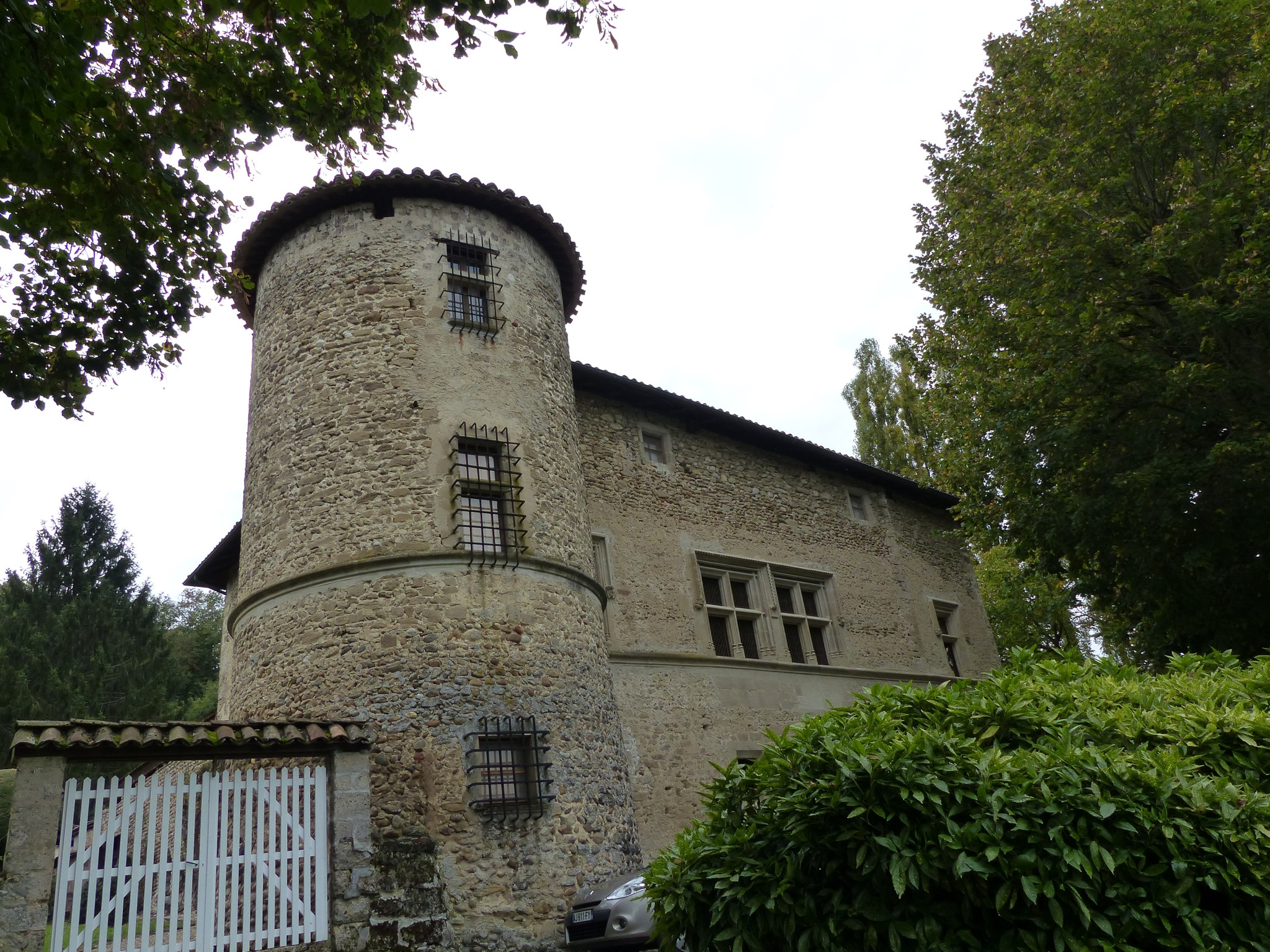
- Chateau of Quincivet
- Location of Saint-Vérand
- Location within France Location within Auvergne-Rhône-Alpes
- Coordinates: 45°10′26″N 5°19′57″E
- Country: France
- Region: Auvergne-Rhône-Alpes
- Department: Isère
- Arrondissement: Grenoble
- Canton: Le Sud Grésivaudan
- Intercommunality: Saint-Marcellin Vercors Isère

Government
  - Mayor (2020–2026): Dominique Uni
- Area^{1}: 17.83 km^{2} (6.88 sq mi)
- Elevation: 290 m (950 ft)
- Highest elevation: 480 m (1,570 ft)
- Lowest elevation: 276 m (906 ft)
- Population (2023): 1,711
  - Density: 95.96/km^{2} (248.5/sq mi)
- Time zone: UTC+01:00 (CET)
  - Summer (DST): UTC+02:00 (CEST)
- INSEE/Postal code: 38463 /38160
- ^{1} French Land Register data, which excludes lakes, ponds, glaciers > 1 km^{2} (0.386 sq mi or 247 acres) and river estuaries.

Saint-Vérand (French pronunciation: [sɛ̃ veʁɑ̃]) is a commune in the Isère department in southeastern France.

== Population ==
Historical population
Year	Pop.	±% p.a.
1968	839	—
1975	1,044	+3.17%
1982	1,251	+2.62%
1990	1,348	+0.94%
1999	1,441	+0.74%
2007	1,771	+2.61%
2012	1,770	−0.01%
2017	1,721	−0.56%
2023	1,711	−0.10%
Source: INSEE

== See also ==
- Communes of the Isère department
