= Canton of Le Sud Grésivaudan =

Canton of France

Coordinates: 45.15°N 5.32°E

The canton of Le Sud Grésivaudan is an administrative division of the Isère department, eastern France. It was created at the French canton reorganisation which came into effect in March 2015. Its seat is in Saint-Marcellin.

It consists of the following communes:

1. L'Albenc
2. Auberives-en-Royans
3. Beaulieu
4. Beauvoir-en-Royans
5. Bessins
6. Chantesse
7. Chasselay
8. Châtelus
9. Chatte
10. Chevrières
11. Choranche
12. Cognin-les-Gorges
13. Cras
14. Izeron
15. Malleval-en-Vercors
16. Montagne
17. Morette
18. Murinais
19. Notre-Dame-de-l'Osier
20. Pont-en-Royans
21. Presles
22. Quincieu
23. Rencurel
24. La Rivière
25. Rovon
26. Saint-André-en-Royans
27. Saint-Antoine-l'Abbaye
28. Saint-Appolinard
29. Saint-Bonnet-de-Chavagne
30. Saint-Gervais
31. Saint-Hilaire-du-Rosier
32. Saint-Just-de-Claix
33. Saint-Lattier
34. Saint-Marcellin
35. Saint-Pierre-de-Chérennes
36. Saint-Romans
37. Saint-Sauveur
38. Saint-Vérand
39. Serre-Nerpol
40. La Sône
41. Têche
42. Varacieux
43. Vatilieu
44. Vinay
