= Beaulieu, Isère =

Beaulieu
- Commune
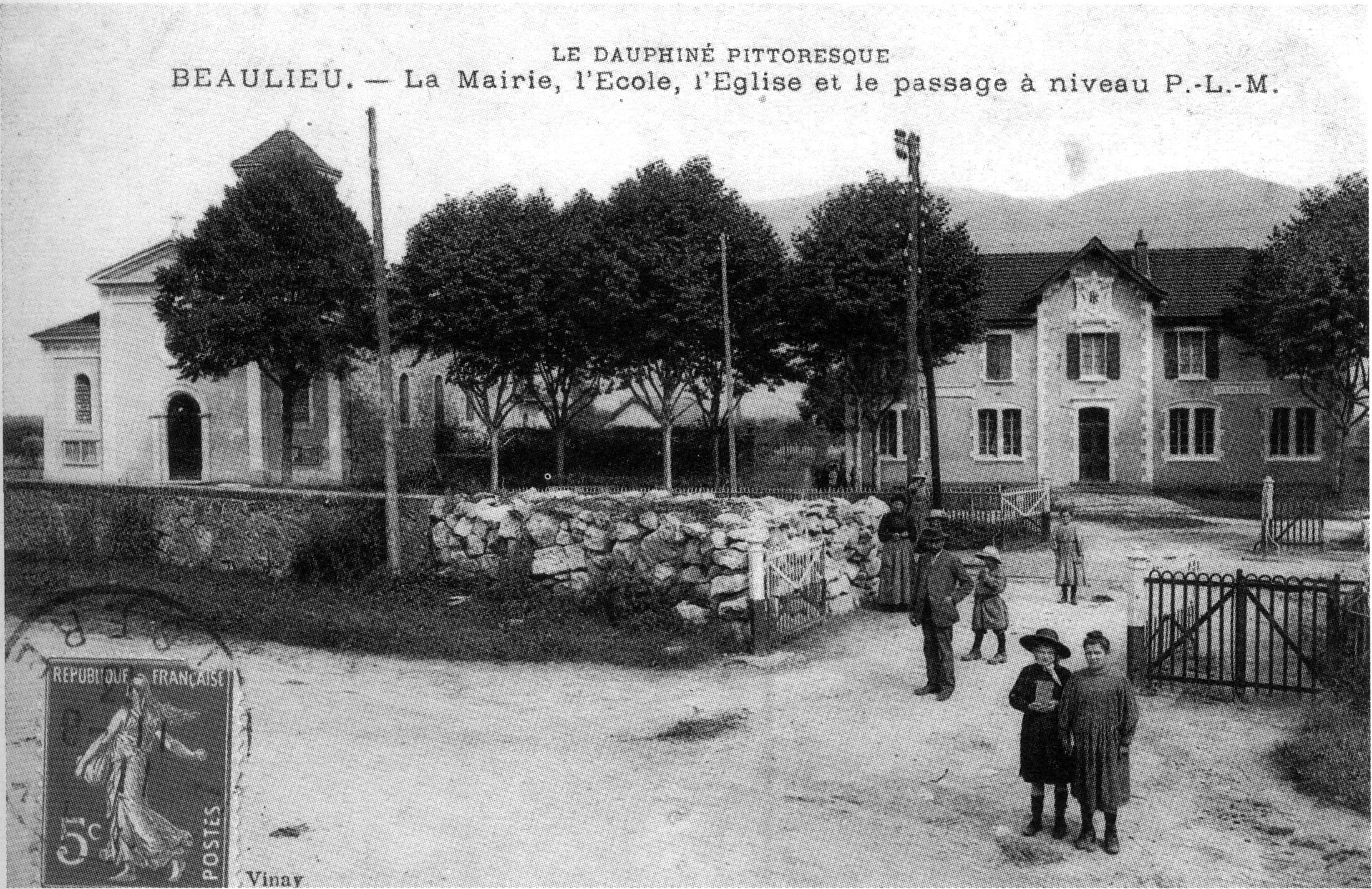
- The town hall, school, and church of Beaulieu, in 1911
- Location of Beaulieu
- Location within France Location within Auvergne-Rhône-Alpes
- Coordinates: 45°11′36″N 5°23′33″E
- Country: France
- Region: Auvergne-Rhône-Alpes
- Department: Isère
- Arrondissement: Grenoble
- Canton: Le Sud Grésivaudan
- Intercommunality: Saint-Marcellin Vercors Isère

Government
  - Mayor (2020–2026): Didier Corvey-Biron
- Area^{1}: 8.79 km^{2} (3.39 sq mi)
- Elevation: 260 m (850 ft)
- Highest elevation: 355 m (1,165 ft)
- Lowest elevation: 160 m (520 ft)
- Population (2023): 635
  - Density: 72.2/km^{2} (187/sq mi)
- Time zone: UTC+01:00 (CET)
  - Summer (DST): UTC+02:00 (CEST)
- INSEE/Postal code: 38033 /38470
- ^{1} French Land Register data, which excludes lakes, ponds, glaciers > 1 km^{2} (0.386 sq mi or 247 acres) and river estuaries.

Beaulieu (French pronunciation: [boljˈø]) is a commune in the Isère department in southeastern France.

== Population ==
Historical population
| Year | Pop. | ±% p.a. |
|---|---|---|
| 1968 | 372 | — |
| 1975 | 410 | +1.40% |
| 1982 | 432 | +0.75% |
| 1990 | 450 | +0.51% |
| 1999 | 514 | +1.49% |
| 2007 | 603 | +2.02% |
| 2012 | 633 | +0.98% |
| 2017 | 638 | +0.16% |
| 2023 | 635 | −0.08% |
Source: INSEE

== See also ==
- Communes of the Isère department
