= La Sône =

- Commune
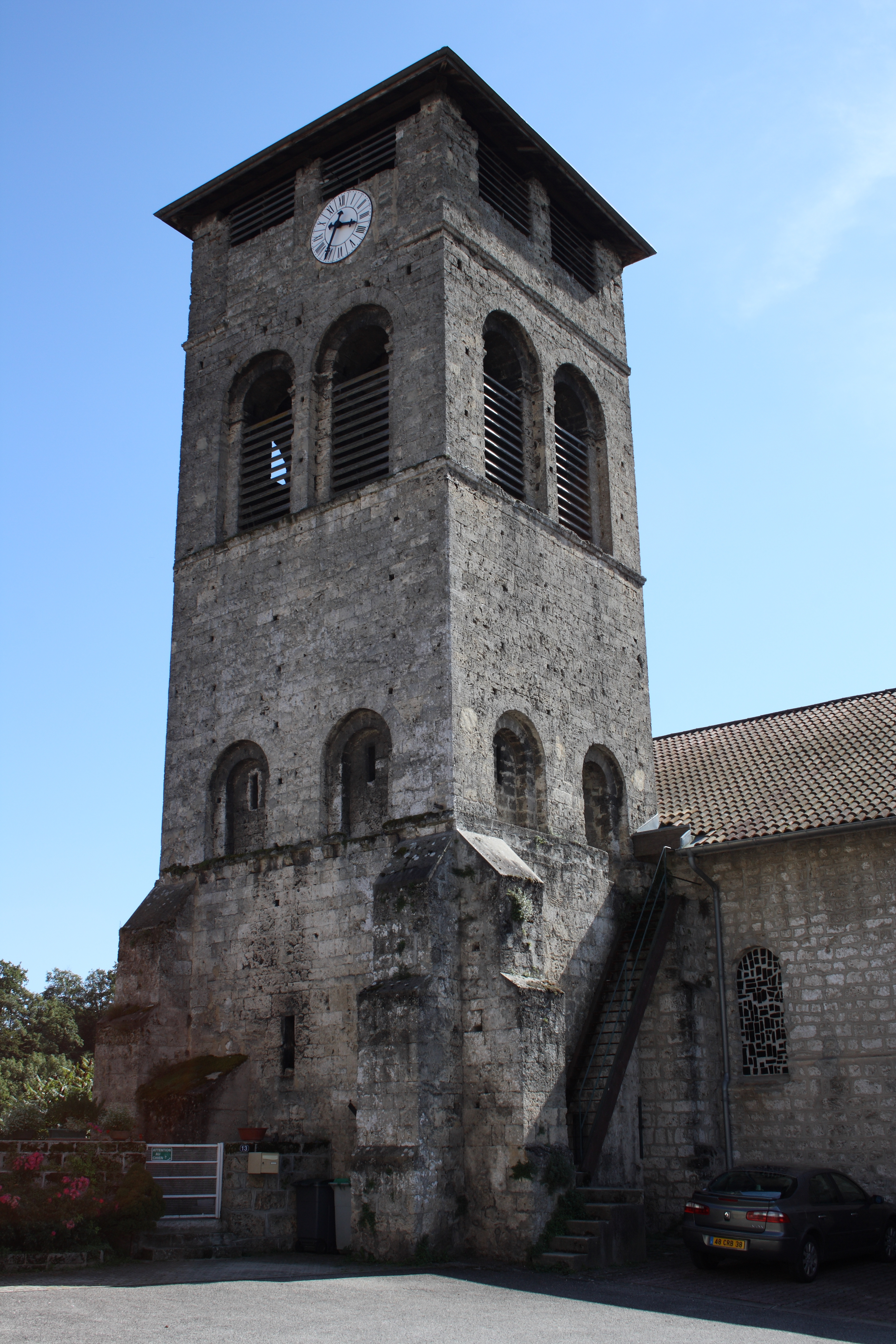
- The church of Saint-Pierre, in La Sône
- Location of La Sône
- Location within France Location within Auvergne-Rhône-Alpes
- Coordinates: 45°06′43″N 5°16′43″E
- Country: France
- Region: Auvergne-Rhône-Alpes
- Department: Isère
- Arrondissement: Grenoble
- Canton: Le Sud Grésivaudan
- Intercommunality: Saint-Marcellin Vercors Isère

Government
  - Mayor (2020–2026): Patrick Seyve
- Area^{1}: 2.95 km^{2} (1.14 sq mi)
- Highest elevation: 270 m (890 ft)
- Lowest elevation: 160 m (520 ft)
- Population (2023): 634
  - Density: 215/km^{2} (557/sq mi)
- Time zone: UTC+01:00 (CET)
  - Summer (DST): UTC+02:00 (CEST)
- INSEE/Postal code: 38495 /38840
- ^{1} French Land Register data, which excludes lakes, ponds, glaciers > 1 km^{2} (0.386 sq mi or 247 acres) and river estuaries.

La Sône (French pronunciation: [la son]) is a commune in the Isère department in southeastern France.

== Population ==
Historical population
| Year | Pop. | ±% p.a. |
|---|---|---|
| 1968 | 641 | — |
| 1975 | 671 | +0.66% |
| 1982 | 665 | −0.13% |
| 1990 | 574 | −1.82% |
| 1999 | 590 | +0.31% |
| 2007 | 624 | +0.70% |
| 2012 | 605 | −0.62% |
| 2017 | 584 | −0.70% |
| 2023 | 634 | +1.38% |
Source: INSEE

== See also ==
- Communes of the Isère department
