= Izeron =

- Commune
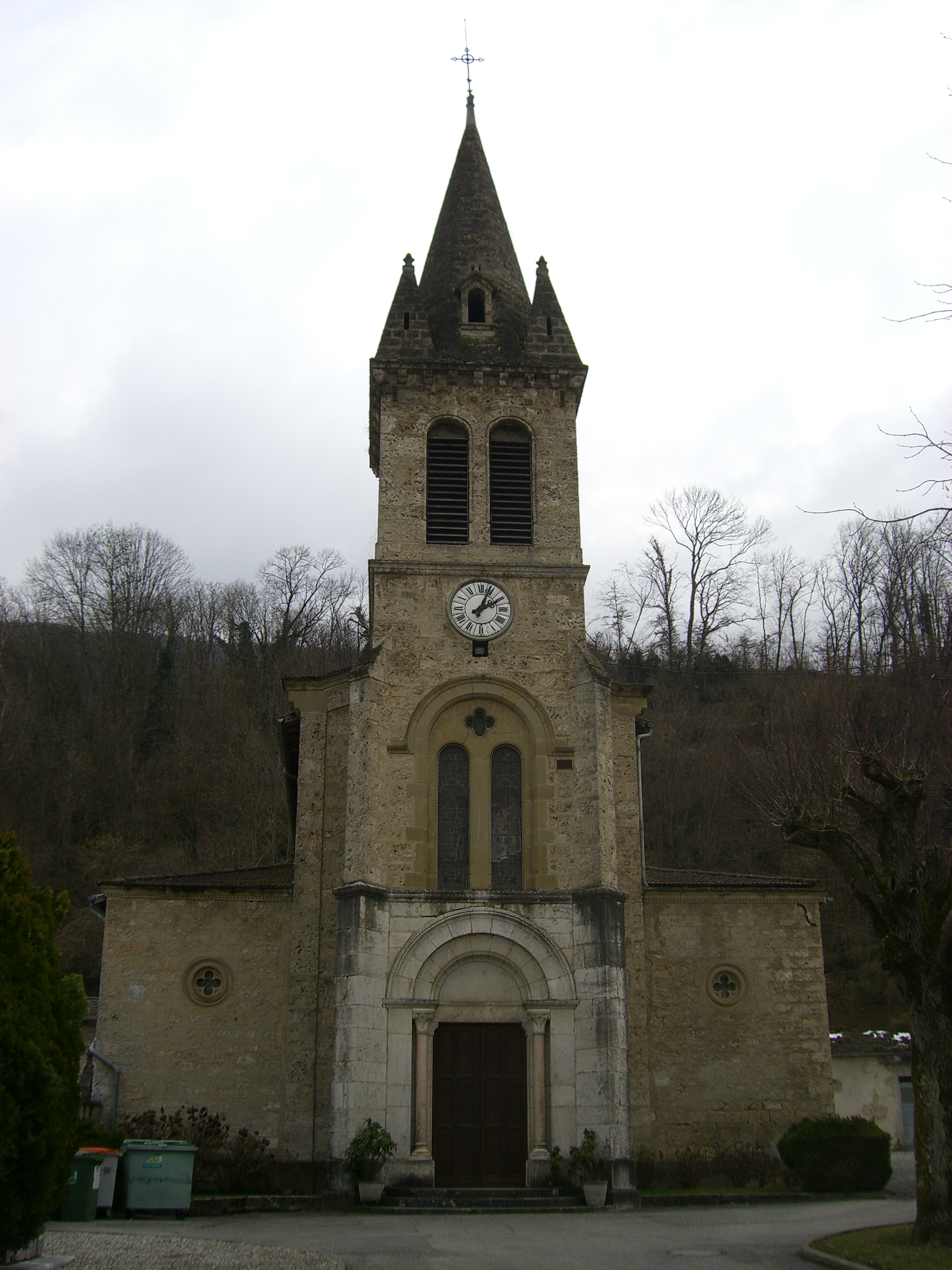
- The church of Izeron

- Coat of arms
- Location of Izeron
- Location within France Location within Auvergne-Rhône-Alpes
- Coordinates: 45°08′50″N 5°22′36″E
- Country: France
- Region: Auvergne-Rhône-Alpes
- Department: Isère
- Arrondissement: Grenoble
- Canton: Le Sud Grésivaudan
- Intercommunality: Saint-Marcellin Vercors Isère

Government
  - Mayor (2020–2026): David Charbonnel
- Area^{1}: 17.19 km^{2} (6.64 sq mi)
- Elevation: 211 m (692 ft)
- Highest elevation: 1,440 m (4,720 ft)
- Lowest elevation: 166 m (545 ft)
- Population (2023): 809
  - Density: 47.1/km^{2} (122/sq mi)
- Time zone: UTC+01:00 (CET)
  - Summer (DST): UTC+02:00 (CEST)
- INSEE/Postal code: 38195 /38160
- ^{1} French Land Register data, which excludes lakes, ponds, glaciers > 1 km^{2} (0.386 sq mi or 247 acres) and river estuaries.

Izeron (French pronunciation: [izʁɔ̃]) is a commune in the Isère department in southeastern France.

== Population ==
Historical population
Year	Pop.	±% p.a.
1968	513	—
1975	494	−0.54%
1982	554	+1.65%
1990	570	+0.36%
1999	609	+0.74%
2007	727	+2.24%
2012	732	+0.14%
2017	726	−0.16%
2023	809	+1.82%
Source: INSEE

== See also ==
- Communes of the Isère department
- Parc naturel régional du Vercors
