= Auberives-en-Royans =

- Commune
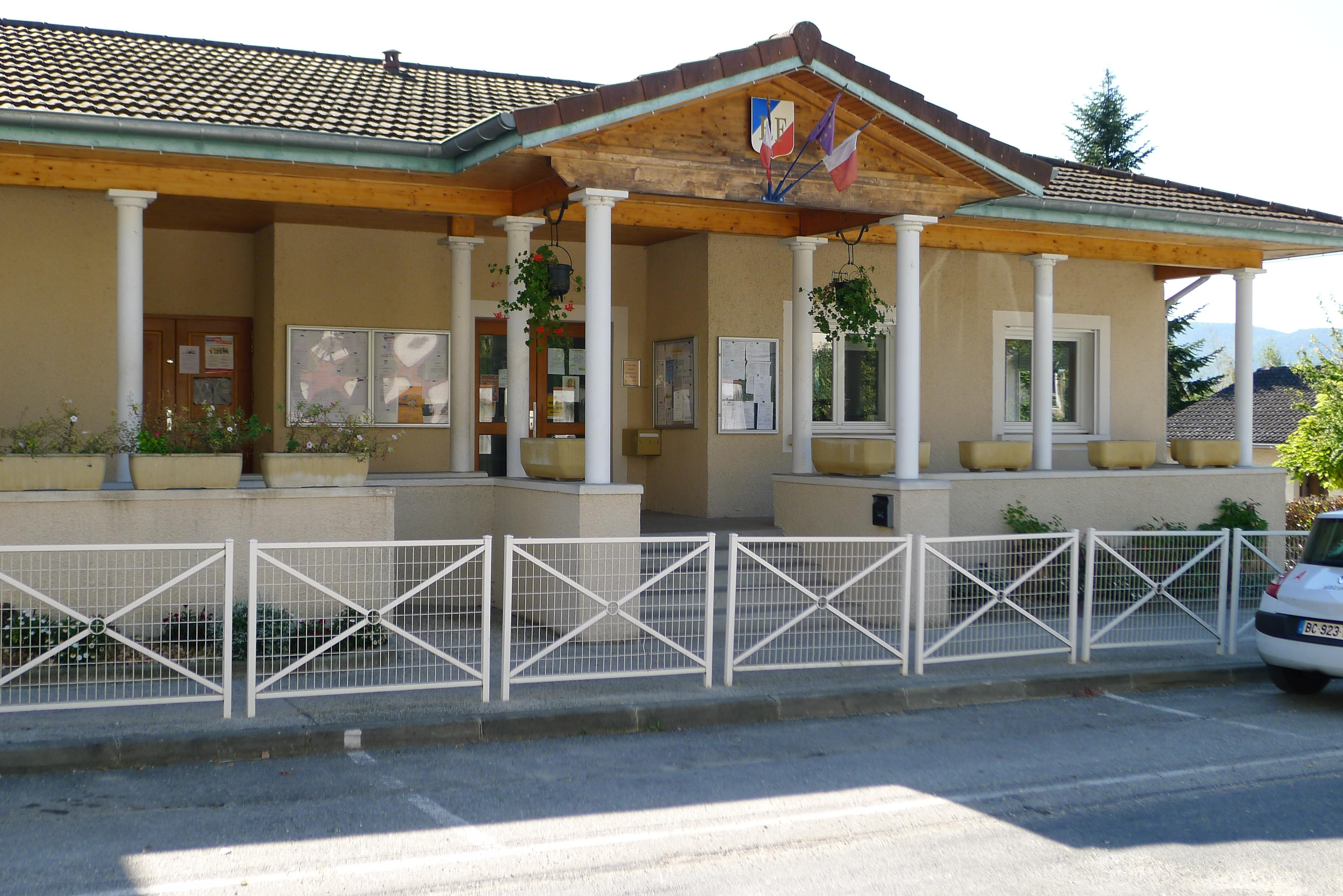
- The Town Hall
- Location of Auberives-en-Royans
- Location within France Location within Auvergne-Rhône-Alpes
- Coordinates: 45°03′51″N 5°18′07″E
- Country: France
- Region: Auvergne-Rhône-Alpes
- Department: Isère
- Arrondissement: Grenoble
- Canton: Le Sud Grésivaudan
- Intercommunality: Saint-Marcellin Vercors Isère Communauté

Government
  - Mayor (2020–2026): Stéphane Villard
- Area^{1}: 5.07 km^{2} (1.96 sq mi)
- Highest elevation: 330 m (1,080 ft)
- Lowest elevation: 170 m (560 ft)
- Population (2023): 367
  - Density: 72.4/km^{2} (187/sq mi)
- Time zone: UTC+01:00 (CET)
  - Summer (DST): UTC+02:00 (CEST)
- INSEE/Postal code: 38018 /38680
- ^{1} French Land Register data, which excludes lakes, ponds, glaciers > 1 km^{2} (0.386 sq mi or 247 acres) and river estuaries.

Auberives-en-Royans (French pronunciation: [obʁiv ɑ̃ ʁwajɑ̃]; Occitan: Aubaribas de Roians) is a commune in the Isère department in the Auvergne-Rhône-Alpes region of south-eastern France.

== Geography ==
Auberives-en-Royans is located at the foot of the Vercors plateau in the Isère valley some 19 km east of Romans-sur-Isère and 11 km south of Saint-Marcellin. The southern border of the commune is the border between Isère and Drôme departments. Access to the commune is by the D531 road which branches from the D1532 east of Saint-Nazaire-en-Royans which passes through the south of the commune and the village and continues along the southern border east to Pont-en-Royans. The D518 road comes from Saint-Romans in the north and passes down the eastern border of the commune to Pont-en-Royans. The commune has some forests in the north and the rest is farmland.

The southern border of the commune consists entirely of the Bourne river as it flows west to join the Isère at Saint-Nazaire-en-Royans. The Tarze river flows through the centre of the commune from the north and joins the Bourne near the village. The Canal de la Bourne starts in the south-west of the commune and flows through the commune parallel to the Bourne towards the Isère.

== Administration ==
List of Successive Mayors

From	To	Name
2008	2014	Bernard Perazio
2014	2026	Stéphane Villard

== Demography ==
The inhabitants of the commune are known as Albaripains or Albaripaines in French.

Historical population

Year	Pop.	±% p.a.
1793	275	—
1821	327	+0.62%
1846	345	+0.21%
1872	332	−0.15%
1901	412	+0.75%
1926	352	−0.63%
1946	286	−1.03%
1962	282	−0.09%
1968	295	+0.75%

Year	Pop.	±% p.a.
1975	279	−0.79%
1982	294	+0.75%
1990	321	+1.10%
1999	327	+0.21%
2007	348	+0.78%
2012	374	+1.45%
2017	376	+0.11%
2023	367	−0.40%

Source: EHESS and INSEE

== Sites and monuments ==
- A Church from the 19th century
- A Fortified house

== See also ==
- Communes of the Isère department
- Parc naturel régional du Vercors
