= Malleval-en-Vercors =

- Commune
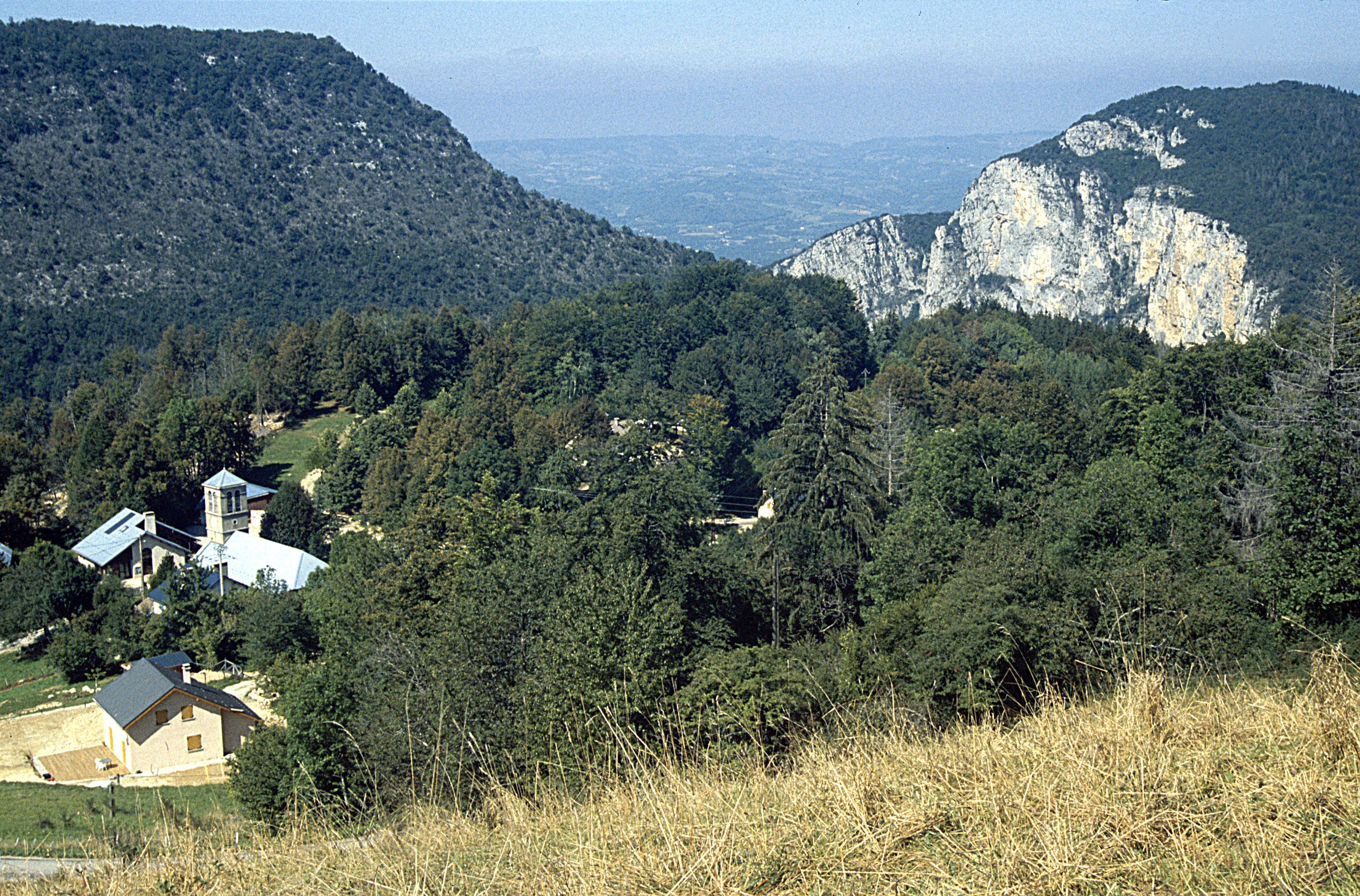
- A general view of Malleval
- Location of Malleval-en-Vercors
- Location within France Location within Auvergne-Rhône-Alpes
- Coordinates: 45°08′52″N 5°26′18″E
- Country: France
- Region: Auvergne-Rhône-Alpes
- Department: Isère
- Arrondissement: Grenoble
- Canton: Le Sud Grésivaudan
- Intercommunality: Saint-Marcellin Vercors Isère

Government
  - Mayor (2022–2026): Christophe Durand
- Area^{1}: 14.1 km^{2} (5.4 sq mi)
- Elevation: 940 m (3,080 ft)
- Highest elevation: 1,440 m (4,720 ft)
- Lowest elevation: 440 m (1,440 ft)
- Population (2023): 57
  - Density: 4.0/km^{2} (10/sq mi)
- Time zone: UTC+01:00 (CET)
  - Summer (DST): UTC+02:00 (CEST)
- INSEE/Postal code: 38216 /38470
- ^{1} French Land Register data, which excludes lakes, ponds, glaciers > 1 km^{2} (0.386 sq mi or 247 acres) and river estuaries.

Malleval-en-Vercors is a commune in the Isère department in southeastern France.

The commune was named Malleval until September 12, 2005.

== Population ==
Historical population
Year	Pop.	±% p.a.
1968	12	—
1975	11	−1.24%
1982	27	+13.69%
1990	18	−4.94%
1999	31	+6.23%
2007	56	+7.67%
2012	50	−2.24%
2017	53	+1.17%
2023	57	+1.22%
Source: INSEE

== See also ==
- Communes of the Isère department
- Parc naturel régional du Vercors
