= Saint-Lattier =

- Commune
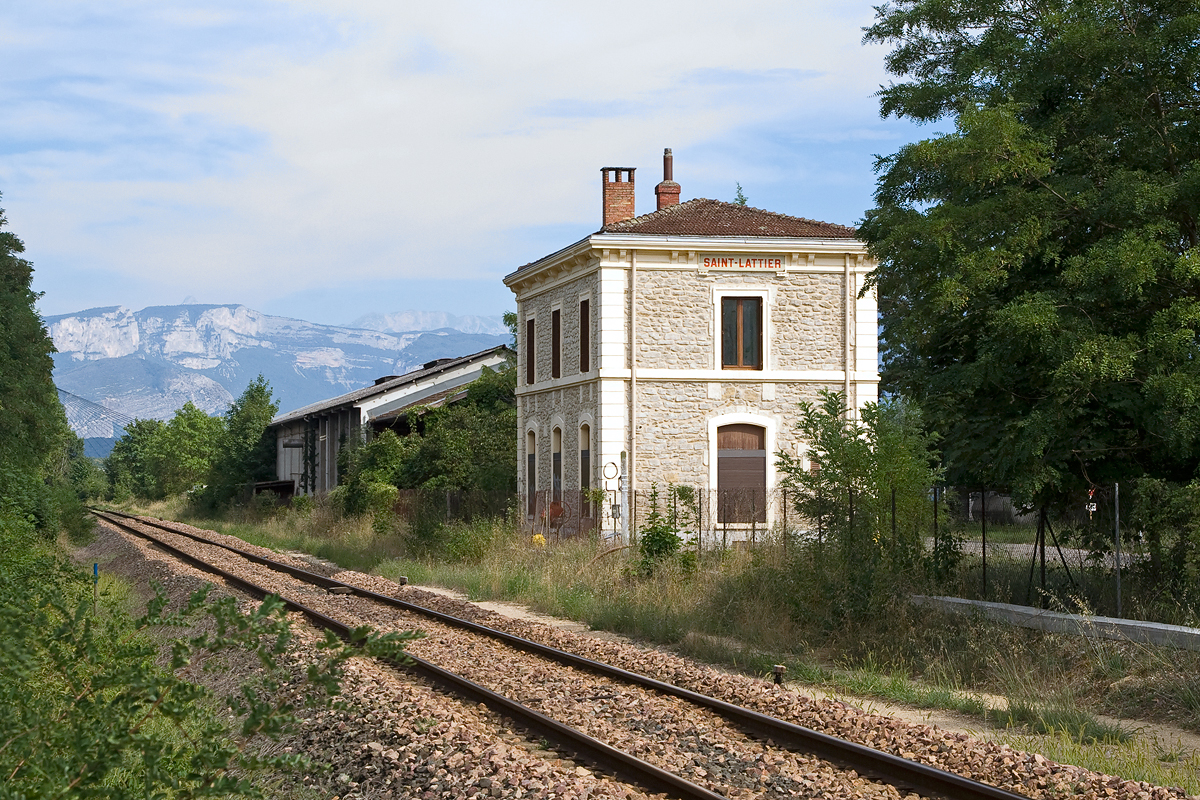
- Train station
- Location of Saint-Lattier
- Location within France Location within Auvergne-Rhône-Alpes
- Coordinates: 45°05′19″N 5°12′05″E
- Country: France
- Region: Auvergne-Rhône-Alpes
- Department: Isère
- Arrondissement: Grenoble
- Canton: Le Sud Grésivaudan

Government
  - Mayor (2020–2026): Raymond Payen
- Area^{1}: 18.17 km^{2} (7.02 sq mi)
- Elevation: 178 m (584 ft)
- Highest elevation: 406 m (1,332 ft)
- Lowest elevation: 144 m (472 ft)
- Population (2023): 1,486
  - Density: 81.78/km^{2} (211.8/sq mi)
- Time zone: UTC+01:00 (CET)
  - Summer (DST): UTC+02:00 (CEST)
- INSEE/Postal code: 38410 /38840
- ^{1} French Land Register data, which excludes lakes, ponds, glaciers > 1 km^{2} (0.386 sq mi or 247 acres) and river estuaries.

Saint-Lattier (French pronunciation: [sɛ̃ latje]) is a commune in the Isère department in southeastern France.

== Population ==
Historical population
Year	Pop.	±% p.a.
1968	833	—
1975	775	−1.03%
1982	902	+2.19%
1990	1,028	+1.65%
1999	1,031	+0.03%
2007	1,214	+2.06%
2012	1,270	+0.91%
2017	1,338	+1.05%
2023	1,486	+1.76%
Source: INSEE

== See also ==
- Communes of the Isère department
