= Cognin-les-Gorges =

- Commune
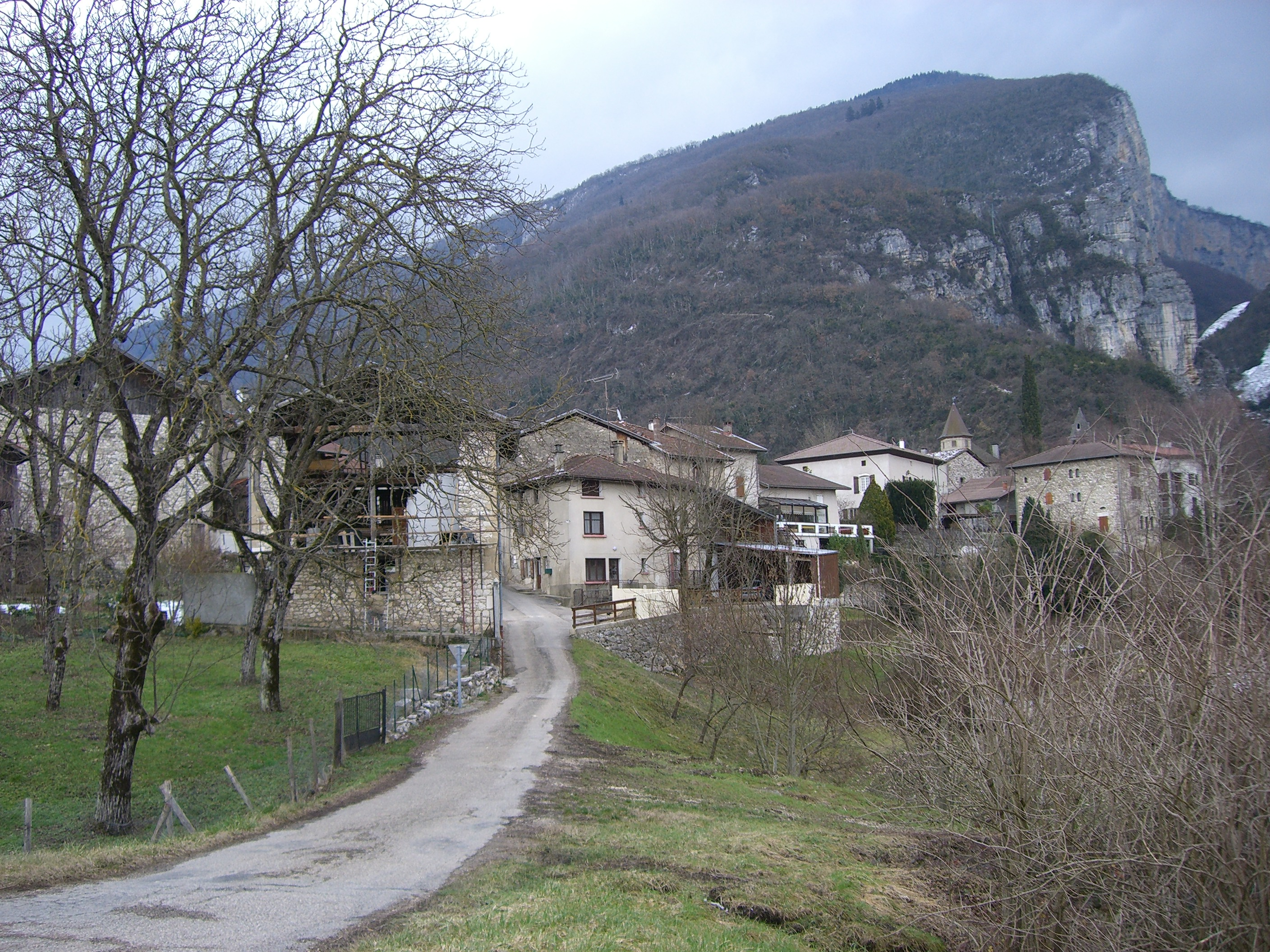
- A general view of Cognin-les-Gorges
- Location of Cognin-les-Gorges
- Location within France Location within Auvergne-Rhône-Alpes
- Coordinates: 45°10′18″N 5°24′44″E
- Country: France
- Region: Auvergne-Rhône-Alpes
- Department: Isère
- Arrondissement: Grenoble
- Canton: Le Sud Grésivaudan

Government
  - Mayor (2020–2026): Patrice Ferrouillat
- Area^{1}: 12.52 km^{2} (4.83 sq mi)
- Elevation: 270 m (890 ft)
- Highest elevation: 1,120 m (3,670 ft)
- Lowest elevation: 166 m (545 ft)
- Population (2023): 615
  - Density: 49.1/km^{2} (127/sq mi)
- Time zone: UTC+01:00 (CET)
  - Summer (DST): UTC+02:00 (CEST)
- INSEE/Postal code: 38117 /38470
- ^{1} French Land Register data, which excludes lakes, ponds, glaciers > 1 km^{2} (0.386 sq mi or 247 acres) and river estuaries.

Cognin-les-Gorges (French pronunciation: [kɔɲɛ̃ le ɡɔʁʒ]) is a commune in the Isère department in southeastern France.

== Population ==
Historical population
Year	Pop.	±% p.a.
1968	397	—
1975	341	−2.15%
1982	425	+3.20%
1990	532	+2.85%
1999	539	+0.15%
2007	631	+1.99%
2012	648	+0.53%
2017	635	−0.40%
2023	615	−0.53%
Source: INSEE

== See also ==
- Communes of the Isère department
- Parc naturel régional du Vercors
