= Quincieu =

- Commune
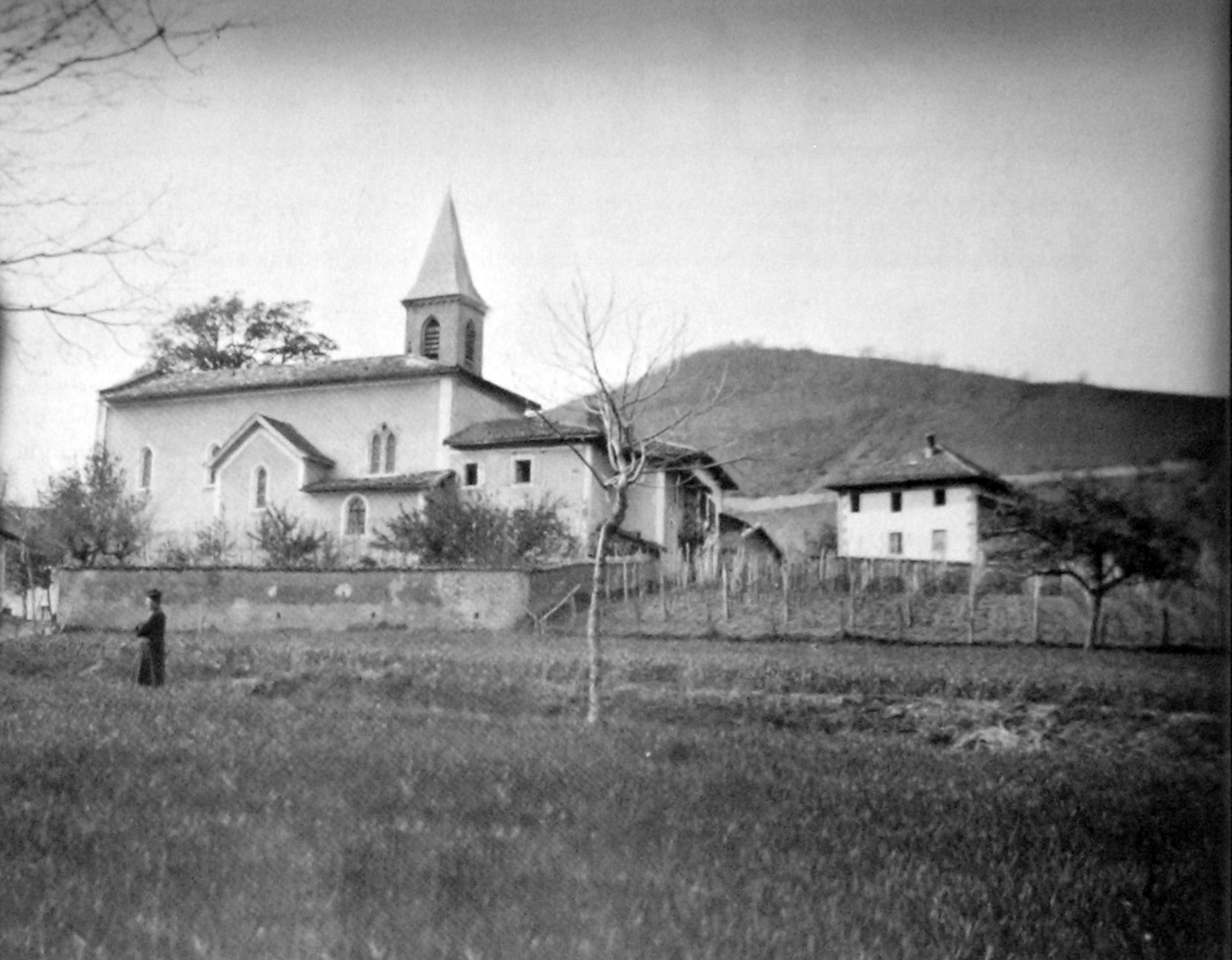
- The church of Notre-Dame, in Quincieu, at the start of the 20th century
- Location of Quincieu
- Location within France Location within Auvergne-Rhône-Alpes
- Coordinates: 45°16′35″N 5°23′10″E
- Country: France
- Region: Auvergne-Rhône-Alpes
- Department: Isère
- Arrondissement: Grenoble
- Canton: Le Sud Grésivaudan

Government
  - Mayor (2020–2026): Lauriane Albertin
- Area^{1}: 4.75 km^{2} (1.83 sq mi)
- Elevation: 600 m (2,000 ft)
- Highest elevation: 771 m (2,530 ft)
- Lowest elevation: 480 m (1,570 ft)
- Population (2023): 106
  - Density: 22.3/km^{2} (57.8/sq mi)
- Time zone: UTC+01:00 (CET)
  - Summer (DST): UTC+02:00 (CEST)
- INSEE/Postal code: 38330 /38470
- ^{1} French Land Register data, which excludes lakes, ponds, glaciers > 1 km^{2} (0.386 sq mi or 247 acres) and river estuaries.

Quincieu (French pronunciation: [kɛ̃sjø]) is a commune in the Isère department in southeastern France.

== Population ==
Historical population
| Year | Pop. | ±% p.a. |
|---|---|---|
| 1968 | 87 | — |
| 1975 | 69 | −3.26% |
| 1982 | 75 | +1.20% |
| 1990 | 73 | −0.34% |
| 1999 | 74 | +0.15% |
| 2007 | 70 | −0.69% |
| 2012 | 101 | +7.61% |
| 2017 | 103 | +0.39% |
| 2023 | 106 | +0.48% |
Source: INSEE

== See also ==
- Communes of the Isère department
