= Saint-André-en-Royans =

- Commune
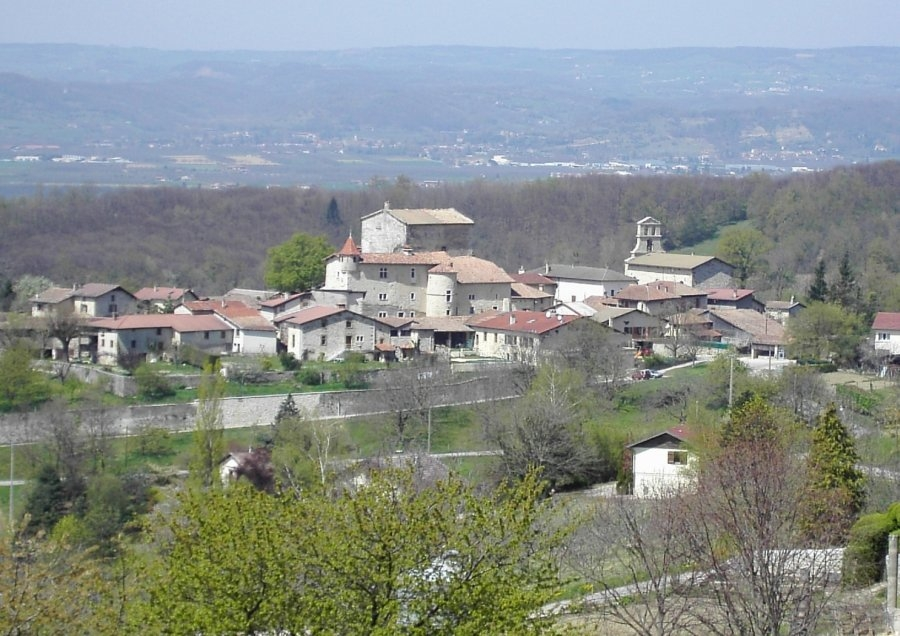
- A general view of Saint-André-en-Royans

- Coat of arms
- Location of Saint-André-en-Royans
- Location within France Location within Auvergne-Rhône-Alpes
- Coordinates: 45°05′12″N 5°20′22″E
- Country: France
- Region: Auvergne-Rhône-Alpes
- Department: Isère
- Arrondissement: Grenoble
- Canton: Le Sud Grésivaudan

Government
  - Mayor (2020–2026): Frédéric de Azevedo
- Area^{1}: 10.42 km^{2} (4.02 sq mi)
- Elevation: 320 m (1,050 ft)
- Highest elevation: 1,007 m (3,304 ft)
- Lowest elevation: 224 m (735 ft)
- Population (2023): 342
  - Density: 32.8/km^{2} (85.0/sq mi)
- Time zone: UTC+01:00 (CET)
  - Summer (DST): UTC+02:00 (CEST)
- INSEE/Postal code: 38356 /38680
- ^{1} French Land Register data, which excludes lakes, ponds, glaciers > 1 km^{2} (0.386 sq mi or 247 acres) and river estuaries.

Saint-André-en-Royans (French pronunciation: [sɛ̃t‿ɑ̃dʁe ɑ̃ ʁwajɑ̃]; Occitan: Sent Andrieu de Roians) is a commune in the Isère department in southeastern France.

== Population ==
Historical population
Year	Pop.	±% p.a.
1968	278	—
1975	239	−2.14%
1982	251	+0.70%
1990	273	+1.06%
1999	297	+0.94%
2007	323	+1.05%
2012	326	+0.19%
2017	315	−0.68%
2023	342	+1.38%
Source: INSEE

== See also ==
- Communes of the Isère department
- Parc naturel régional du Vercors
