= Chasselay, Isère =

Chasselay
- Commune
- Location of Chasselay
- Location within France Location within Auvergne-Rhône-Alpes
- Coordinates: 45°15′24″N 5°20′21″E
- Country: France
- Region: Auvergne-Rhône-Alpes
- Department: Isère
- Arrondissement: Grenoble
- Canton: Le Sud Grésivaudan

Government
  - Mayor (2020–2026): Gilbert Champon
- Area^{1}: 9.45 km^{2} (3.65 sq mi)
- Elevation: 500 m (1,600 ft)
- Highest elevation: 729 m (2,392 ft)
- Lowest elevation: 418 m (1,371 ft)
- Population (2023): 444
  - Density: 47.0/km^{2} (122/sq mi)
- Time zone: UTC+01:00 (CET)
  - Summer (DST): UTC+02:00 (CEST)
- INSEE/Postal code: 38086 /38470
- ^{1} French Land Register data, which excludes lakes, ponds, glaciers > 1 km^{2} (0.386 sq mi or 247 acres) and river estuaries.

Chasselay (French pronunciation: [ʃaslɛ]) is a commune in the Isère department in southeastern France.

== Population ==
Historical population
Year	Pop.	±% p.a.
1968	287	—
1975	258	−1.51%
1982	262	+0.22%
1990	304	+1.88%
1999	341	+1.28%
2007	421	+2.67%
2012	426	+0.24%
2017	406	−0.96%
2023	444	+1.50%
Source: INSEE

== See also ==
- Communes of the Isère department
