= Saint-Appolinard, Isère =

Saint-Appolinard
- Commune
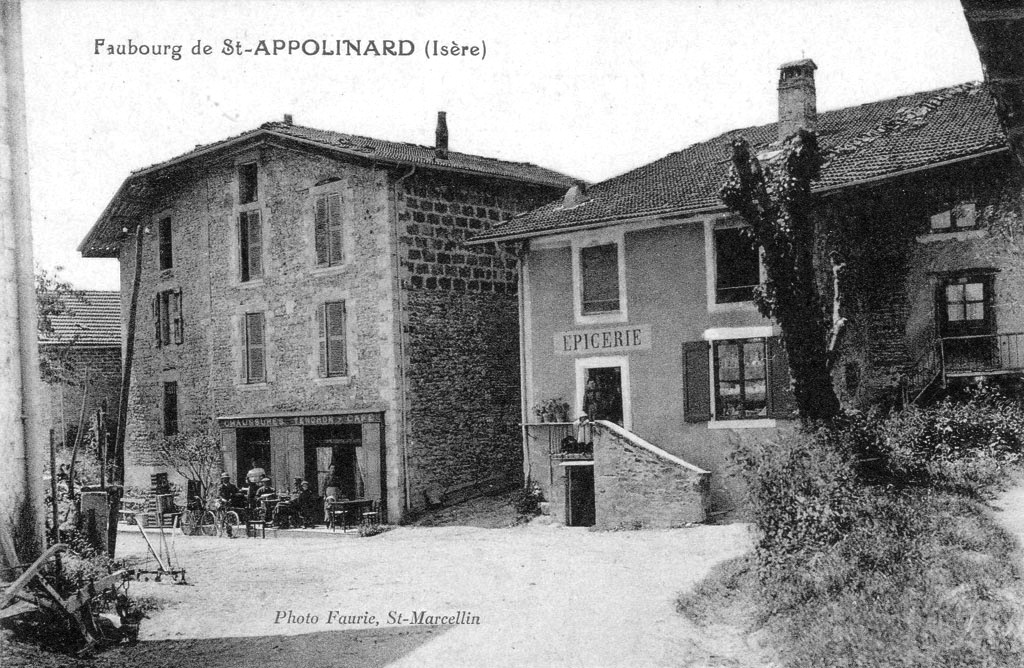
- Saint-Appolinard in the early 20th century
- Location of Saint-Appolinard
- Location within France Location within Auvergne-Rhône-Alpes
- Coordinates: 45°11′23″N 5°15′47″E
- Country: France
- Region: Auvergne-Rhône-Alpes
- Department: Isère
- Arrondissement: Grenoble
- Canton: Le Sud Grésivaudan

Government
  - Mayor (2020–2026): Daniel Ferlay
- Area^{1}: 10.76 km^{2} (4.15 sq mi)
- Elevation: 380 m (1,250 ft)
- Highest elevation: 643 m (2,110 ft)
- Lowest elevation: 329 m (1,079 ft)
- Population (2023): 395
  - Density: 36.7/km^{2} (95.1/sq mi)
- Time zone: UTC+01:00 (CET)
  - Summer (DST): UTC+02:00 (CEST)
- INSEE/Postal code: 38360 /38160
- ^{1} French Land Register data, which excludes lakes, ponds, glaciers > 1 km^{2} (0.386 sq mi or 247 acres) and river estuaries.

Saint-Appolinard (French pronunciation: [sɛ̃.t‿apɔlinaʁ]) is a commune in the Isère department in southeastern France.

== Population ==
Historical population
Year	Pop.	±% p.a.
1968	305	—
1975	282	−1.11%
1982	296	+0.69%
1990	289	−0.30%
1999	319	+1.10%
2007	389	+2.51%
2012	397	+0.41%
2017	409	+0.60%
2023	395	−0.58%
Source: INSEE

== See also ==
- Communes of the Isère department
