= La Rivière, Isère =

La Rivière
- Commune
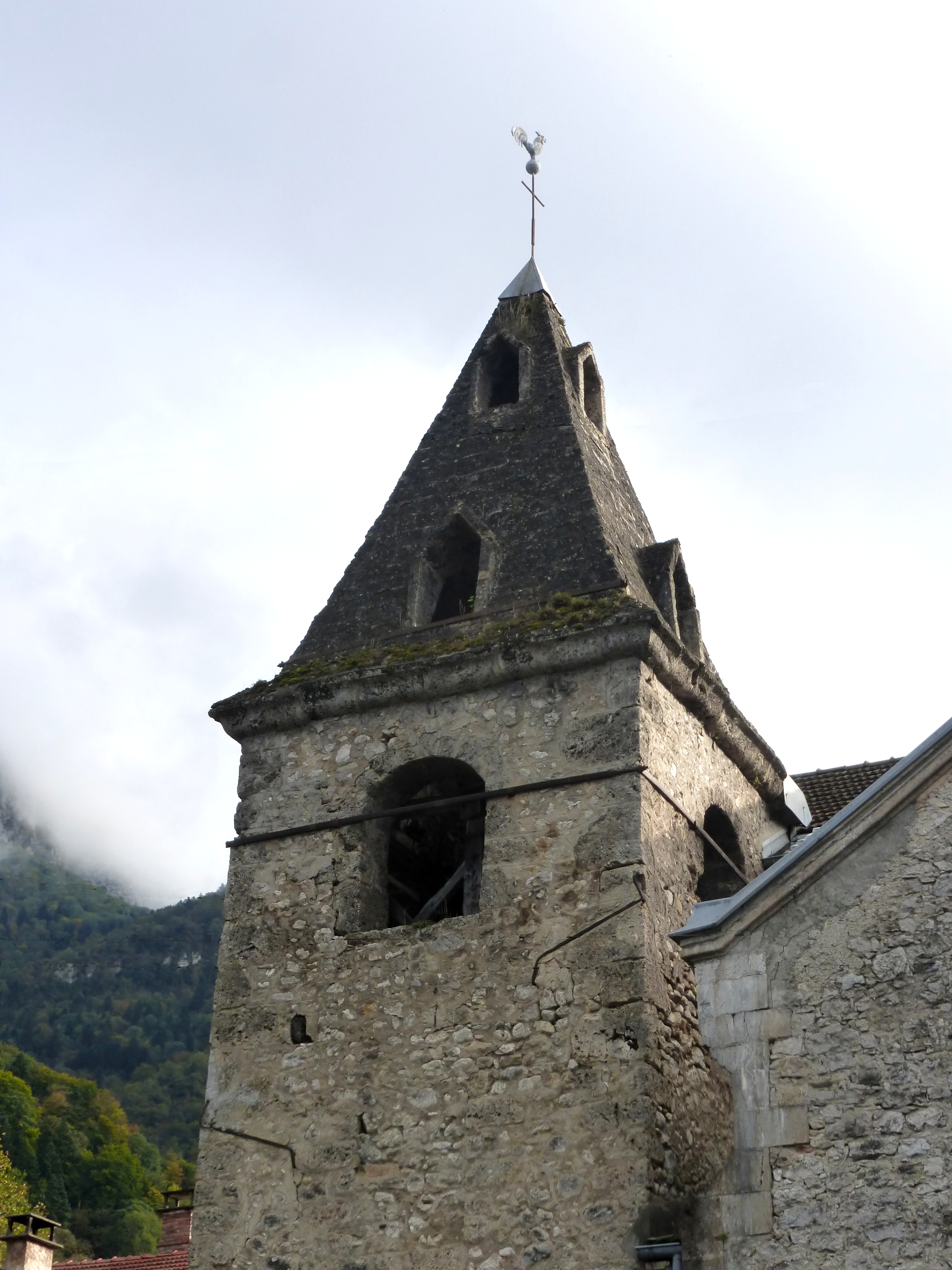
- The bell tower of the church of La Rivière
- Location of La Rivière
- Location within France Location within Auvergne-Rhône-Alpes
- Coordinates: 45°14′15″N 5°30′32″E
- Country: France
- Region: Auvergne-Rhône-Alpes
- Department: Isère
- Arrondissement: Grenoble
- Canton: Le Sud Grésivaudan
- Intercommunality: Saint-Marcellin Vercors Isère

Government
  - Mayor (2020–2026): Raymond Rolland
- Area^{1}: 18.45 km^{2} (7.12 sq mi)
- Elevation: 196 m (643 ft)
- Highest elevation: 1,604 m (5,262 ft)
- Lowest elevation: 178 m (584 ft)
- Population (2023): 720
  - Density: 39/km^{2} (100/sq mi)
- Time zone: UTC+01:00 (CET)
  - Summer (DST): UTC+02:00 (CEST)
- INSEE/Postal code: 38338 /38210
- ^{1} French Land Register data, which excludes lakes, ponds, glaciers > 1 km^{2} (0.386 sq mi or 247 acres) and river estuaries.

La Rivière (French pronunciation: [la ʁivjɛʁ]) is a commune in the Isère department in southeastern France.

== Population ==
Historical population
| Year | Pop. | ±% p.a. |
|---|---|---|
| 1968 | 244 | — |
| 1975 | 214 | −1.86% |
| 1982 | 312 | +5.53% |
| 1990 | 363 | +1.91% |
| 1999 | 469 | +2.89% |
| 2007 | 551 | +2.03% |
| 2012 | 745 | +6.22% |
| 2017 | 747 | +0.05% |
| 2023 | 720 | −0.61% |
Source: INSEE

== See also ==
- Communes of the Isère department
- Parc naturel régional du Vercors
