= Chevrières, Isère =

Chevrières
- Commune
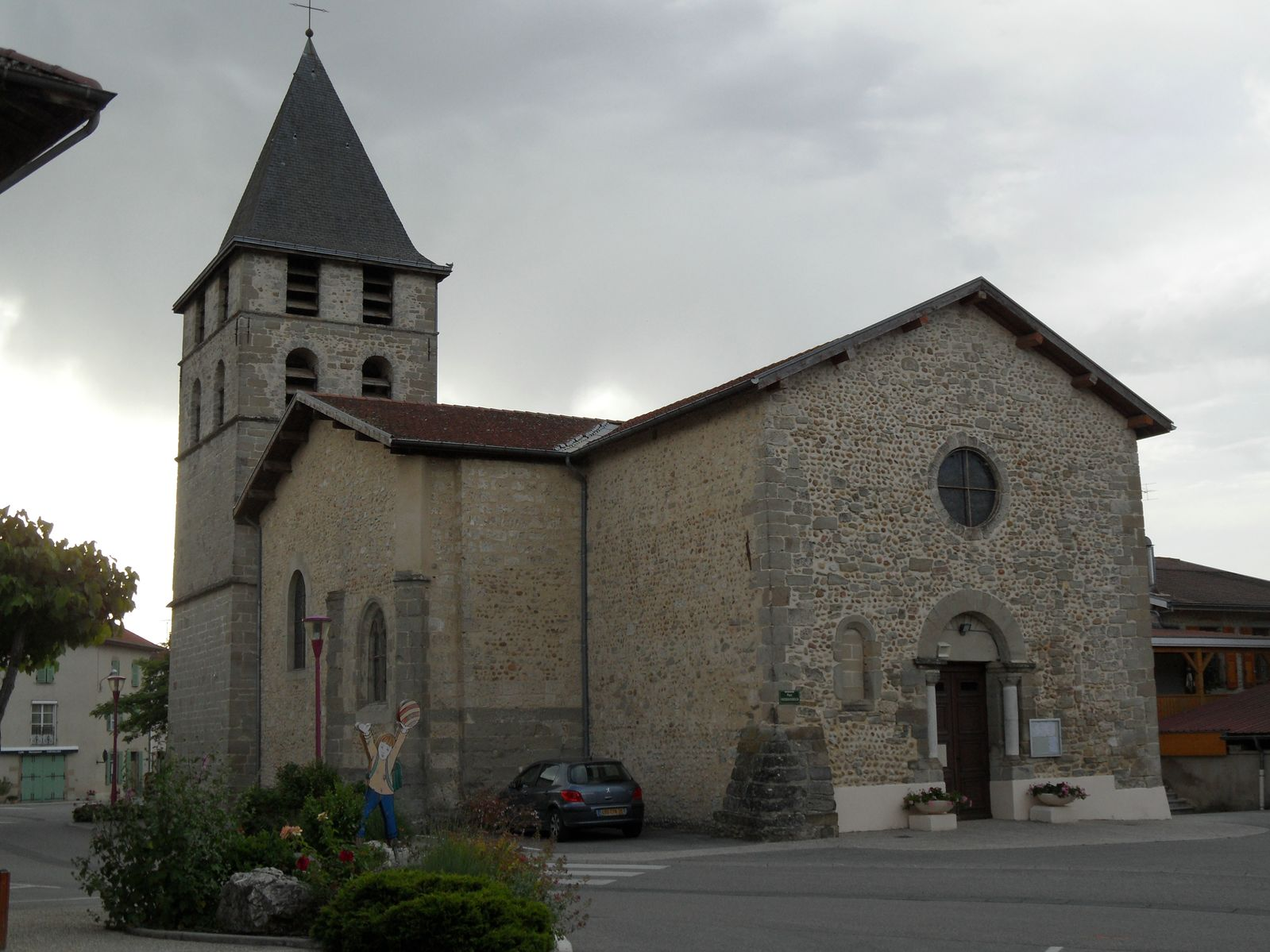
- The church of Chevrières
- Location of Chevrières
- Location within France Location within Auvergne-Rhône-Alpes
- Coordinates: 45°11′18″N 5°17′27″E
- Country: France
- Region: Auvergne-Rhône-Alpes
- Department: Isère
- Arrondissement: Grenoble
- Canton: Le Sud Grésivaudan

Government
  - Mayor (2020–2026): Franck Rousset
- Area^{1}: 16.62 km^{2} (6.42 sq mi)
- Elevation: 402 m (1,319 ft)
- Highest elevation: 661 m (2,169 ft)
- Lowest elevation: 310 m (1,020 ft)
- Population (2023): 742
  - Density: 44.6/km^{2} (116/sq mi)
- Time zone: UTC+01:00 (CET)
  - Summer (DST): UTC+02:00 (CEST)
- INSEE/Postal code: 38099 /38160
- ^{1} French Land Register data, which excludes lakes, ponds, glaciers > 1 km^{2} (0.386 sq mi or 247 acres) and river estuaries.

Chevrières (French pronunciation: [ʃəvʁijɛʁ]) is a commune in the Isère department in southeastern France.

== Population ==
Historical population
Year	Pop.	±% p.a.
1968	447	—
1975	417	−0.99%
1982	456	+1.29%
1990	503	+1.23%
1999	558	+1.16%
2007	653	+1.98%
2012	685	+0.96%
2017	708	+0.66%
2023	742	+0.78%
Source: INSEE

== See also ==
- Communes of the Isère department
