= Vinay, Isère =

Vinay
- Commune
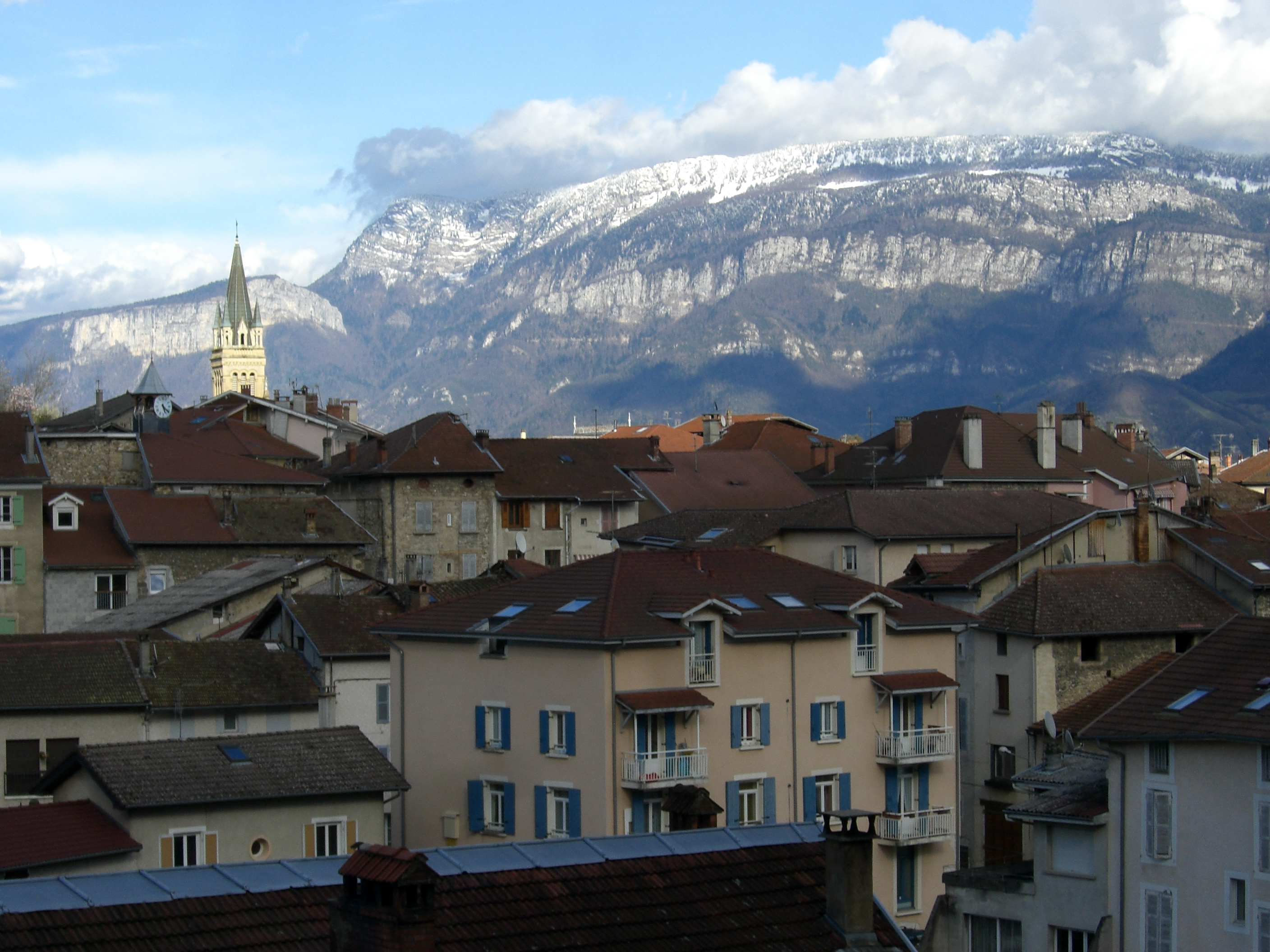
- A general view of Vinay

- Coat of arms
- Location of Vinay
- Location within France Location within Auvergne-Rhône-Alpes
- Coordinates: 45°12′39″N 5°24′16″E
- Country: France
- Region: Auvergne-Rhône-Alpes
- Department: Isère
- Arrondissement: Grenoble
- Canton: Le Sud Grésivaudan

Government
  - Mayor (2020–2026): Philippe Rosaire
- Area^{1}: 16.01 km^{2} (6.18 sq mi)
- Elevation: 262 m (860 ft)
- Highest elevation: 580 m (1,900 ft)
- Lowest elevation: 168 m (551 ft)
- Population (2023): 4,438
  - Density: 277.2/km^{2} (717.9/sq mi)
- Time zone: UTC+01:00 (CET)
  - Summer (DST): UTC+02:00 (CEST)
- INSEE/Postal code: 38559 /38470
- ^{1} French Land Register data, which excludes lakes, ponds, glaciers > 1 km^{2} (0.386 sq mi or 247 acres) and river estuaries.

Vinay (French pronunciation: [vinˈɛ]) is a commune in the Isère department in southeastern France.

Vinay is a largely agricultural village. It is commonly known as the walnut capital of Grenoble and boasts over 175,000 trees.

== Population ==
Historical population

Year	Pop.	±% p.a.
1793	2,379	—
1821	3,131	+0.99%
1846	3,386	+0.31%
1872	2,990	−0.48%
1901	2,668	−0.39%
1926	2,533	−0.21%
1946	2,628	+0.18%
1962	2,721	+0.22%
1968	2,925	+1.21%

Year	Pop.	±% p.a.
1975	3,198	+1.28%
1982	3,376	+0.78%
1990	3,410	+0.13%
1999	3,525	+0.37%
2007	3,888	+1.23%
2012	3,987	+0.50%
2017	4,251	+1.29%
2023	4,438	+0.72%

Source: EHESS and INSEE (1968-2023)

== Twin towns ==
Vinay is twinned with:

- San Possidonio, Italy, since 2013

== See also ==
- Communes of the Isère department
- Parc naturel régional du Vercors
