= Mens, Isère =

Mens
- Commune
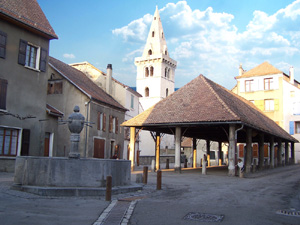
- Covered market
- Location of Mens
- Location within France Location within Auvergne-Rhône-Alpes
- Coordinates: 44°49′04″N 5°45′04″E
- Country: France
- Region: Auvergne-Rhône-Alpes
- Department: Isère
- Arrondissement: Grenoble
- Canton: Matheysine-Trièves
- Intercommunality: Trièves

Government
  - Mayor (2020–2026): Pierre Suzzarini
- Area^{1}: 28.3 km^{2} (10.9 sq mi)
- Highest elevation: 1,929 m (6,329 ft)
- Lowest elevation: 612 m (2,008 ft)
- Population (2023): 1,415
  - Density: 50.0/km^{2} (129/sq mi)
- Time zone: UTC+01:00 (CET)
  - Summer (DST): UTC+02:00 (CEST)
- INSEE/Postal code: 38226 /38710
- Website: www.mairie-de-mens.fr
- ^{1} French Land Register data, which excludes lakes, ponds, glaciers > 1 km^{2} (0.386 sq mi or 247 acres) and river estuaries.

Mens (French pronunciation: [mɛ̃s]; Occitan: Menç) is a commune in the Isère department in southeastern France. In January 1973, it absorbed the former commune Saint-Genis.

== Geography ==
The neighboring communes are: Saint-Sébastien, Saint-Jean-d'Hérans, Cornillon-en-Trièves, Prébois and Saint-Baudille-et-Pipet.

== Population ==
Historical population
Year	Pop.	±% p.a.
1968	1,153	—
1975	1,139	−0.17%
1982	1,116	−0.29%
1990	1,129	+0.14%
1999	1,175	+0.44%
2007	1,409	+2.30%
2012	1,361	−0.69%
2017	1,397	+0.52%
2023	1,415	+0.21%
Source: INSEE

== See also ==
- Col de la Croix Haute
- Communes of the Isère department
