= Monestier =

Monestier is derived from monasterium, Latin for monastery, and may refer to the following places in France:

- Monestier, Allier, a commune in the department of Allier
- Monestier, Ardèche, a commune in the department of Ardèche
- Monestier, Dordogne, a commune in the department of Dordogne
- Monestier-d'Ambel, a commune in the department of Isère
- Monestier-de-Clermont, a commune in the department of Isère
- Monestier-Merlines, a commune in the department of Corrèze
- Monestier-Port-Dieu, a commune in the department of Corrèze
- Saint-Paul-lès-Monestier, a commune in the department of Isère
- Le Monestier, a commune in the department of Puy-de-Dôme
- Le Monestier-du-Percy, a commune in the department of Isère
- Monestier, a family name of different branches especially in France, Italy and the Americas.
