= Sainte-Luce =

Sainte-Luce may refer to the following places:

- Sainte-Luce, Martinique, a commune in the Martinique department, overseas France
- Sainte-Luce, Isère, a commune in the Isère department, France
- Sainte-Luce, Quebec, a municipality in Quebec, Canada
- Sainte-Luce, Madagascar, a fokontany in the District of Fort-Dauphin, Anosy Region, Madagascar
