= Lavars =

- Commune
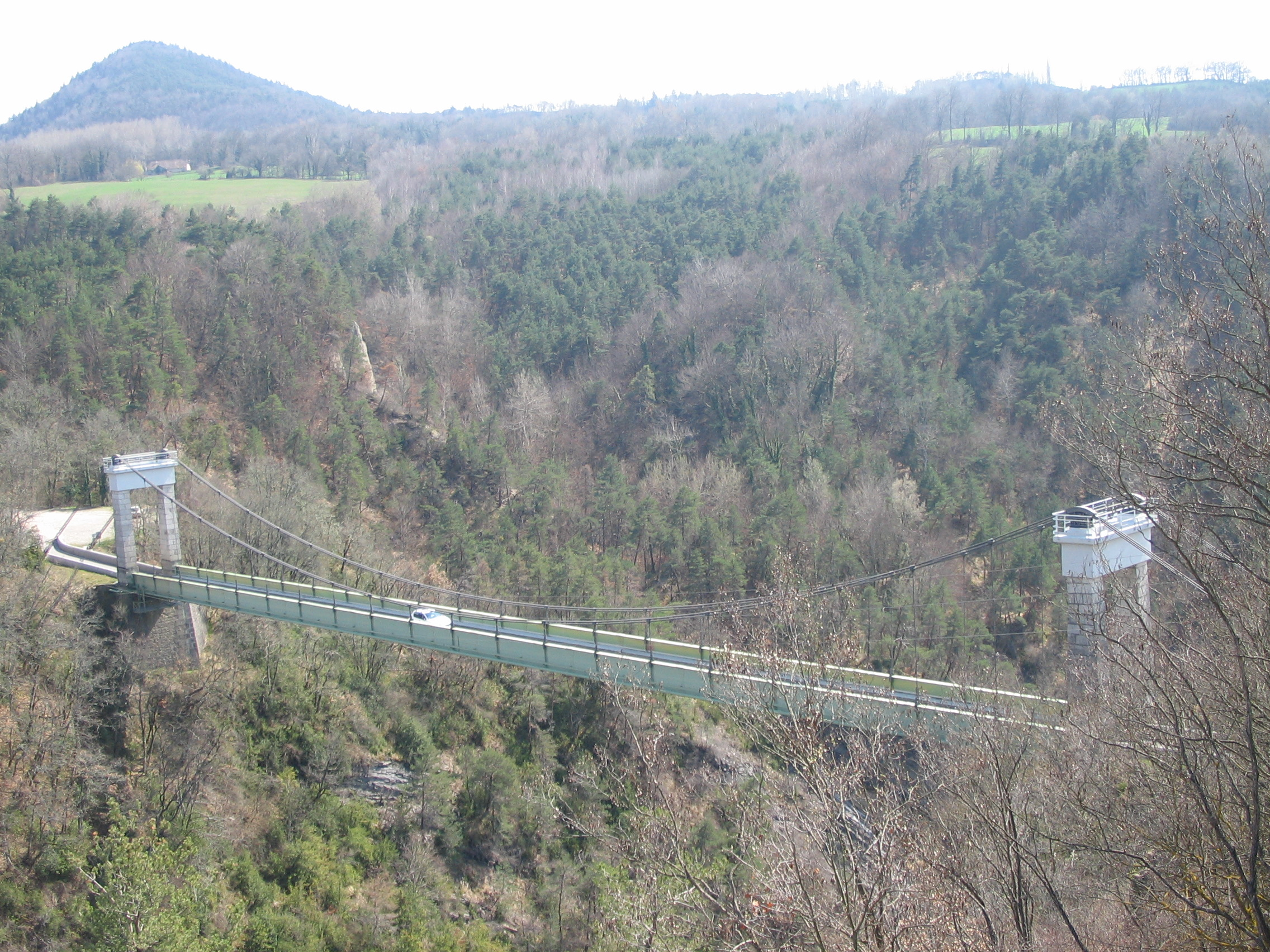
- Brion Bridge
- Location of Lavars
- Location within France Location within Auvergne-Rhône-Alpes
- Coordinates: 44°50′58″N 5°40′23″E
- Country: France
- Region: Auvergne-Rhône-Alpes
- Department: Isère
- Arrondissement: Grenoble
- Canton: Matheysine-Trièves
- Intercommunality: Trièves

Government
  - Mayor (2020–2026): Alexandre Eyraud-Griffet
- Area^{1}: 14.8 km^{2} (5.7 sq mi)
- Highest elevation: 1,080 m (3,540 ft)
- Lowest elevation: 484 m (1,588 ft)
- Population (2023): 172
  - Density: 11.6/km^{2} (30.1/sq mi)
- Time zone: UTC+01:00 (CET)
  - Summer (DST): UTC+02:00 (CEST)
- INSEE/Postal code: 38208 /38710
- ^{1} French Land Register data, which excludes lakes, ponds, glaciers > 1 km^{2} (0.386 sq mi or 247 acres) and river estuaries.

Lavars is a commune in the Isère department in southeastern France.

== Population ==
Historical population
Year	Pop.	±% p.a.
1968	100	—
1975	105	+0.70%
1982	104	−0.14%
1990	117	+1.48%
1999	113	−0.39%
2007	129	+1.67%
2012	150	+3.06%
2017	148	−0.27%
2023	172	+2.54%
Source: INSEE

== See also ==
- Communes of the Isère department
