= Saint-Martin-de-la-Cluze =

- Commune
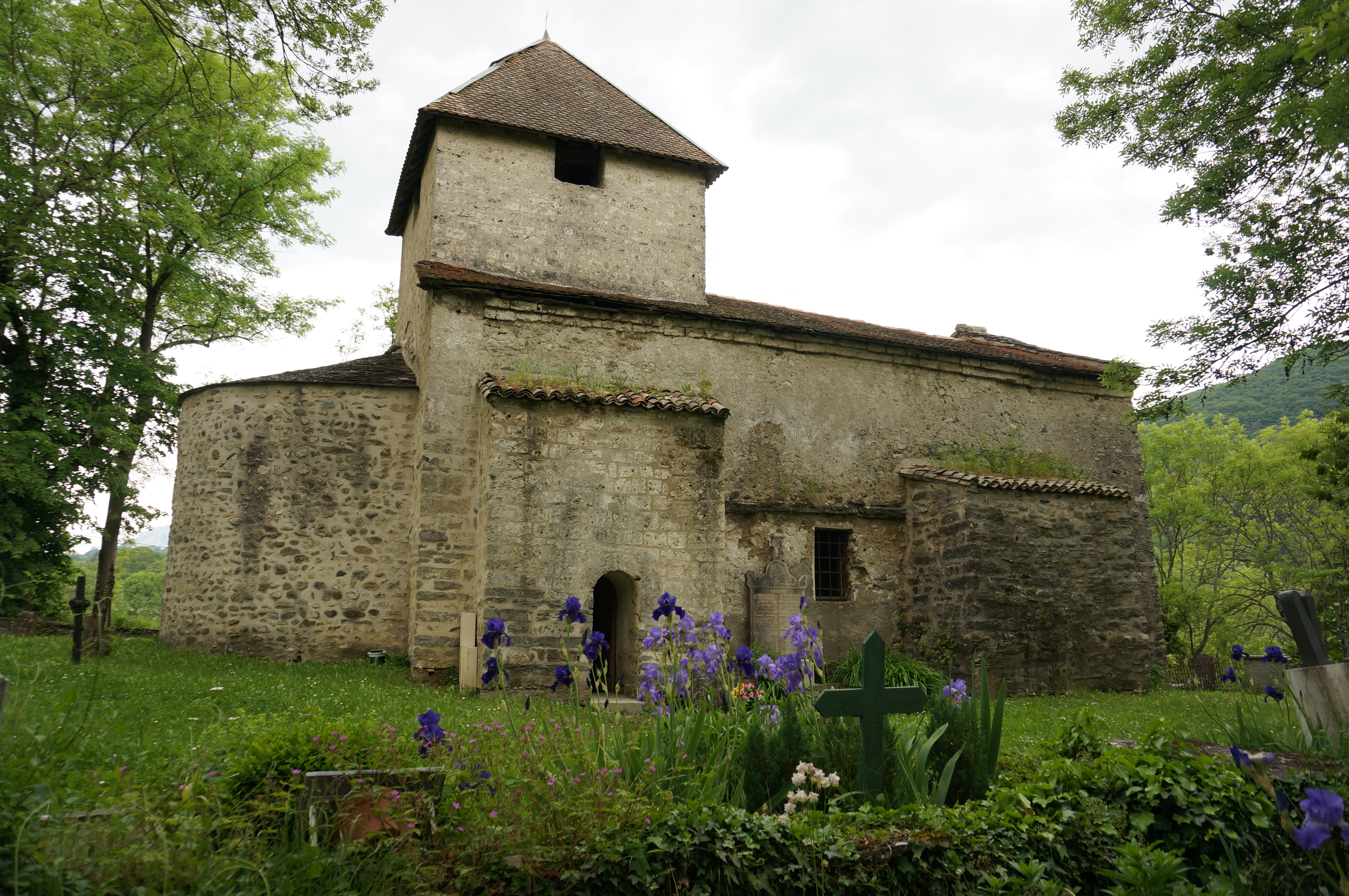
- The chapel of Saint-Christophe
- Location of Saint-Martin-de-la-Cluze
- Location within France Location within Auvergne-Rhône-Alpes
- Coordinates: 44°59′01″N 5°39′33″E
- Country: France
- Region: Auvergne-Rhône-Alpes
- Department: Isère
- Arrondissement: Grenoble
- Canton: Matheysine-Trièves

Government
  - Mayor (2020–2026): Hélène Rossi
- Area^{1}: 16 km^{2} (6.2 sq mi)
- Elevation: 760 m (2,490 ft)
- Highest elevation: 941 m (3,087 ft)
- Lowest elevation: 330 m (1,080 ft)
- Population (2023): 754
  - Density: 47/km^{2} (120/sq mi)
- Time zone: UTC+01:00 (CET)
  - Summer (DST): UTC+02:00 (CEST)
- INSEE/Postal code: 38115 /38650
- ^{1} French Land Register data, which excludes lakes, ponds, glaciers > 1 km^{2} (0.386 sq mi or 247 acres) and river estuaries.

Saint-Martin-de-la-Cluze (French pronunciation: [sɛ̃ maʁtɛ̃ də la klyz]; Occitan: Sant Martin de la Clusa, before 1970: La Cluze-et-Pâquier) is a commune in the Isère department in southeastern France.

== Population ==
Historical population
Year	Pop.	±% p.a.
1968	262	—
1975	281	+1.01%
1982	353	+3.31%
1990	462	+3.42%
1999	566	+2.28%
2007	607	+0.88%
2012	618	+0.36%
2017	717	+3.02%
2023	754	+0.84%
Source: INSEE

== See also ==
- Communes of the Isère department
