= Saint-Honoré, Isère =

Saint-Honoré
- Commune
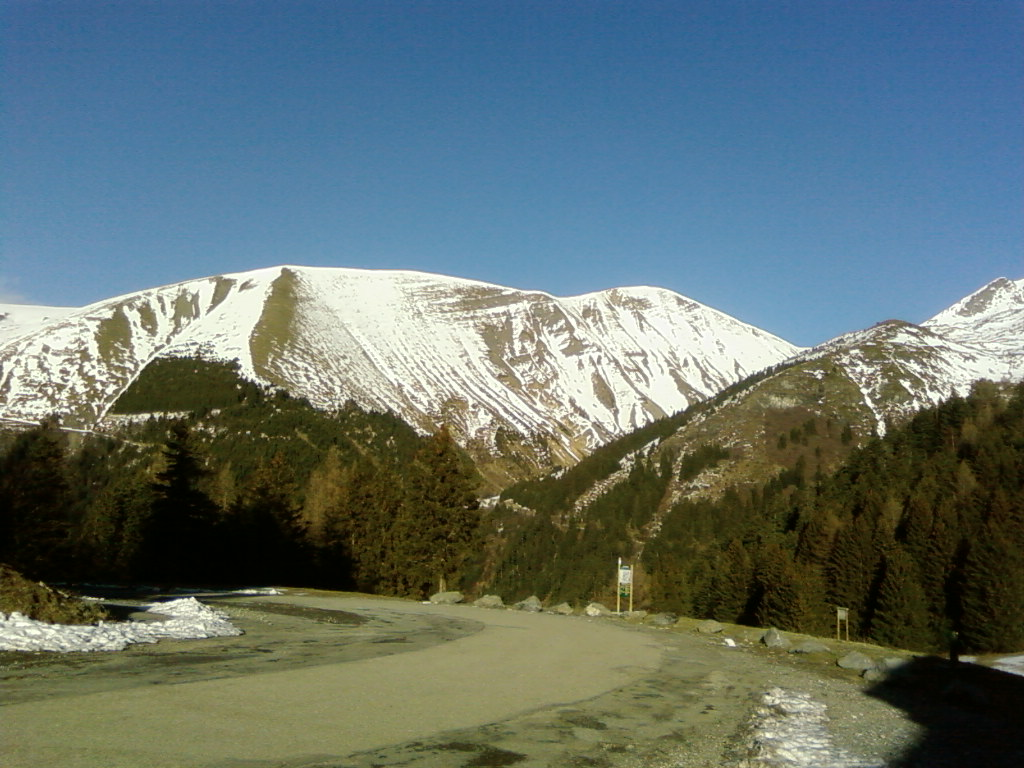
- The old ski station of Saint Honoré 1500
- Location of Saint-Honoré
- Location within France Location within Auvergne-Rhône-Alpes
- Coordinates: 44°57′19″N 5°48′27″E
- Country: France
- Region: Auvergne-Rhône-Alpes
- Department: Isère
- Arrondissement: Grenoble
- Canton: Matheysine-Trièves

Government
  - Mayor (2021–2026): Jean-Pierre Curt
- Area^{1}: 15 km^{2} (5.8 sq mi)
- Elevation: 1,030 m (3,380 ft)
- Highest elevation: 2,384 m (7,822 ft)
- Lowest elevation: 895 m (2,936 ft)
- Population (2023): 830
  - Density: 55/km^{2} (140/sq mi)
- Time zone: UTC+01:00 (CET)
  - Summer (DST): UTC+02:00 (CEST)
- INSEE/Postal code: 38396 /38350
- ^{1} French Land Register data, which excludes lakes, ponds, glaciers > 1 km^{2} (0.386 sq mi or 247 acres) and river estuaries.

Saint-Honoré (French pronunciation: [sɛ̃.t‿ɔnɔʁe]) is a commune in the Isère department in southeastern France.

== Population ==
Historical population
Year	Pop.	±% p.a.
1968	324	—
1975	287	−1.72%
1982	525	+9.01%
1990	715	+3.94%
1999	779	+0.96%
2007	809	+0.47%
2012	809	+0.00%
2017	814	+0.12%
2023	830	+0.32%
Source: INSEE

== See also ==
- Communes of the Isère department
