= La Motte-Saint-Martin =

- Commune
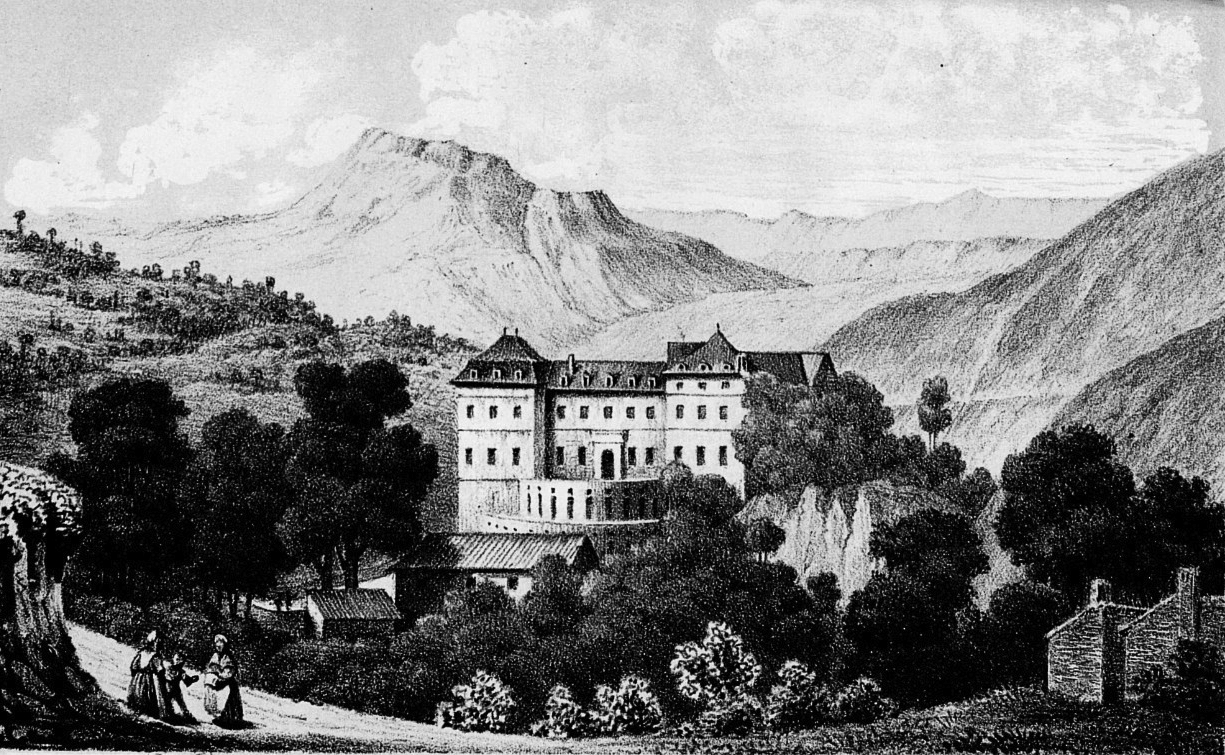
- The thermal establishment of La-Motte-les-Bains in the 19th century
- Location of La Motte-Saint-Martin
- Location within France Location within Auvergne-Rhône-Alpes
- Coordinates: 44°57′04″N 5°43′07″E
- Country: France
- Region: Auvergne-Rhône-Alpes
- Department: Isère
- Arrondissement: Grenoble
- Canton: Matheysine-Trièves

Government
  - Mayor (2020–2026): Franck Gonnord
- Area^{1}: 15 km^{2} (5.8 sq mi)
- Elevation: 697 m (2,287 ft)
- Highest elevation: 1,712 m (5,617 ft)
- Lowest elevation: 486 m (1,594 ft)
- Population (2023): 448
  - Density: 30/km^{2} (77/sq mi)
- Time zone: UTC+01:00 (CET)
  - Summer (DST): UTC+02:00 (CEST)
- INSEE/Postal code: 38266 /38770
- ^{1} French Land Register data, which excludes lakes, ponds, glaciers > 1 km^{2} (0.386 sq mi or 247 acres) and river estuaries.

La Motte-Saint-Martin is a commune in the Isère department in southeastern France.

== Population ==
Historical population
| Year | Pop. | ±% p.a. |
|---|---|---|
| 1968 | 446 | — |
| 1975 | 305 | −5.28% |
| 1982 | 340 | +1.56% |
| 1990 | 339 | −0.04% |
| 1999 | 339 | +0.00% |
| 2007 | 404 | +2.22% |
| 2012 | 415 | +0.54% |
| 2017 | 444 | +1.36% |
| 2023 | 448 | +0.15% |
Source: INSEE

== See also ==
- Communes of the Isère department
