= Saint-Laurent-en-Beaumont =

- Commune
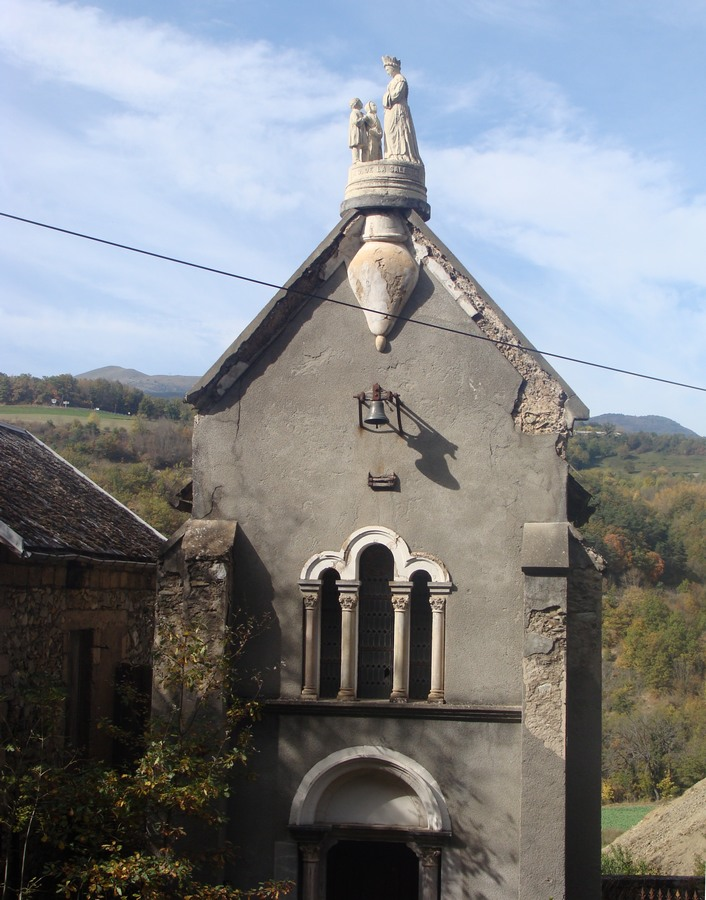
- An abandoned chapel in Saint-Laurent-en-Beaumont
- Location of Saint-Laurent-en-Beaumont
- Location within France Location within Auvergne-Rhône-Alpes
- Coordinates: 44°52′48″N 5°51′03″E
- Country: France
- Region: Auvergne-Rhône-Alpes
- Department: Isère
- Arrondissement: Grenoble
- Canton: Matheysine-Trièves

Government
  - Mayor (2020–2026): Jean-Luc Garnier
- Area^{1}: 13 km^{2} (5.0 sq mi)
- Highest elevation: 1,492 m (4,895 ft)
- Lowest elevation: 557 m (1,827 ft)
- Population (2023): 422
  - Density: 32/km^{2} (84/sq mi)
- Time zone: UTC+01:00 (CET)
  - Summer (DST): UTC+02:00 (CEST)
- INSEE/Postal code: 38413 /38350
- ^{1} French Land Register data, which excludes lakes, ponds, glaciers > 1 km^{2} (0.386 sq mi or 247 acres) and river estuaries.

Saint-Laurent-en-Beaumont (French pronunciation: [sɛ̃ loʁɑ̃ ɑ̃ bomɔ̃]) is a commune in the Isère department in southeastern France.

== Population ==
Historical population
Year	Pop.	±% p.a.
1968	386	—
1975	277	−4.63%
1982	307	+1.48%
1990	282	−1.06%
1999	372	+3.13%
2007	394	+0.72%
2012	456	+2.97%
2017	454	−0.09%
2023	422	−1.21%
Source: INSEE

== See also ==
- Communes of the Isère department
