= Saint-Maurice-en-Trièves =

- Commune
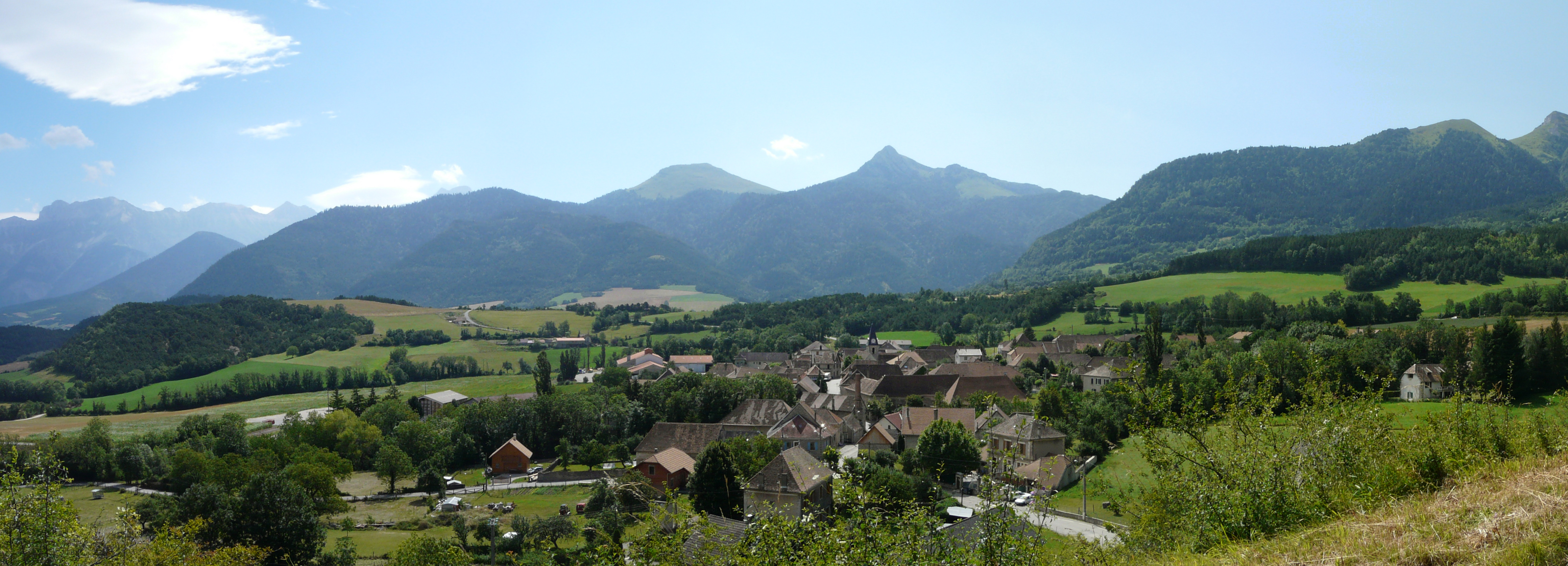
- A panorama of Saint-Maurice-en-Trièves
- Location of Saint-Maurice-en-Trièves
- Location within France Location within Auvergne-Rhône-Alpes
- Coordinates: 44°45′53″N 5°39′51″E
- Country: France
- Region: Auvergne-Rhône-Alpes
- Department: Isère
- Arrondissement: Grenoble
- Canton: Matheysine-Trièves

Government
  - Mayor (2020–2026): Patrick Martinello
- Area^{1}: 13 km^{2} (5.0 sq mi)
- Elevation: 833 m (2,733 ft)
- Highest elevation: 1,975 m (6,480 ft)
- Lowest elevation: 671 m (2,201 ft)
- Population (2023): 180
  - Density: 14/km^{2} (36/sq mi)
- Time zone: UTC+01:00 (CET)
  - Summer (DST): UTC+02:00 (CEST)
- INSEE/Postal code: 38424 /38930
- ^{1} French Land Register data, which excludes lakes, ponds, glaciers > 1 km^{2} (0.386 sq mi or 247 acres) and river estuaries.

Saint-Maurice-en-Trièves (French pronunciation: [sɛ̃ mɔʁis ɑ̃ tʁijɛv]) is a commune in the Isère department in southeastern France.

== Population ==
Historical population
Year	Pop.	±% p.a.
1968	138	—
1975	132	−0.63%
1982	132	+0.00%
1990	122	−0.98%
1999	162	+3.20%
2007	191	+2.08%
2012	164	−3.00%
2017	155	−1.12%
2023	180	+2.52%
Source: INSEE

== See also ==
- Communes of the Isère department
