= Marcieu =

- Commune
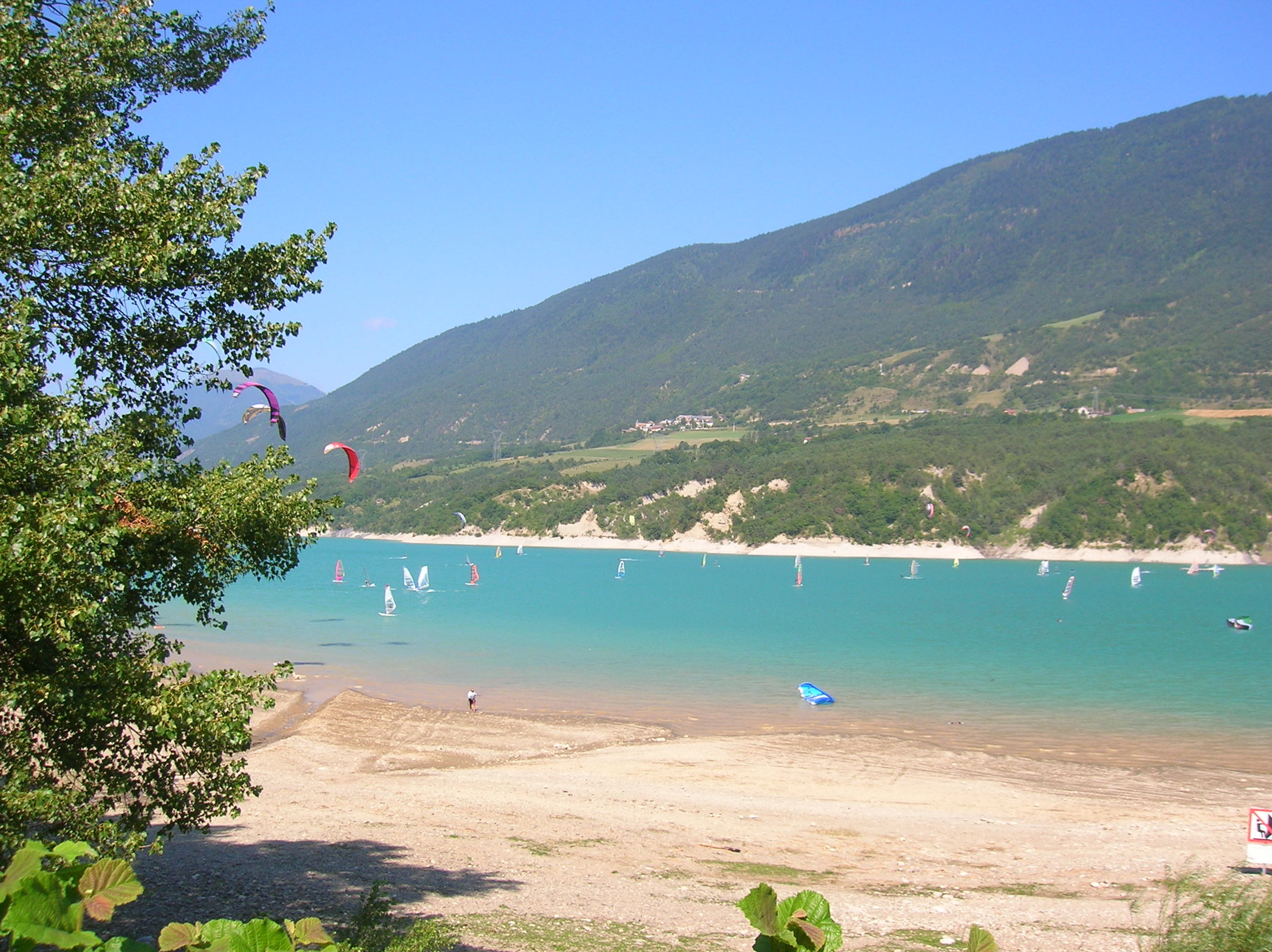
- Monteynard Lake
- Location of Marcieu
- Location within France Location within Auvergne-Rhône-Alpes
- Coordinates: 44°54′56″N 5°41′25″E
- Country: France
- Region: Auvergne-Rhône-Alpes
- Department: Isère
- Arrondissement: Grenoble
- Canton: Matheysine-Trièves

Government
  - Mayor (2020–2026): Fabienne Prévot
- Area^{1}: 12 km^{2} (4.6 sq mi)
- Highest elevation: 1,729 m (5,673 ft)
- Lowest elevation: 485 m (1,591 ft)
- Population (2023): 66
  - Density: 5.5/km^{2} (14/sq mi)
- Time zone: UTC+01:00 (CET)
  - Summer (DST): UTC+02:00 (CEST)
- INSEE/Postal code: 38217 /38350
- ^{1} French Land Register data, which excludes lakes, ponds, glaciers > 1 km^{2} (0.386 sq mi or 247 acres) and river estuaries.

Marcieu (French pronunciation: [maʁsjø]) is a commune in the Isère department in southeastern France.

== Population ==
Historical population
Year	Pop.	±% p.a.
1968	81	—
1975	61	−3.97%
1982	61	+0.00%
1990	70	+1.74%
1999	71	+0.16%
2007	68	−0.54%
2012	78	+2.78%
2017	72	−1.59%
2023	66	−1.44%
Source: INSEE

== See also ==
- Communes of the Isère department
