= Saint-Michel-en-Beaumont =

- Commune
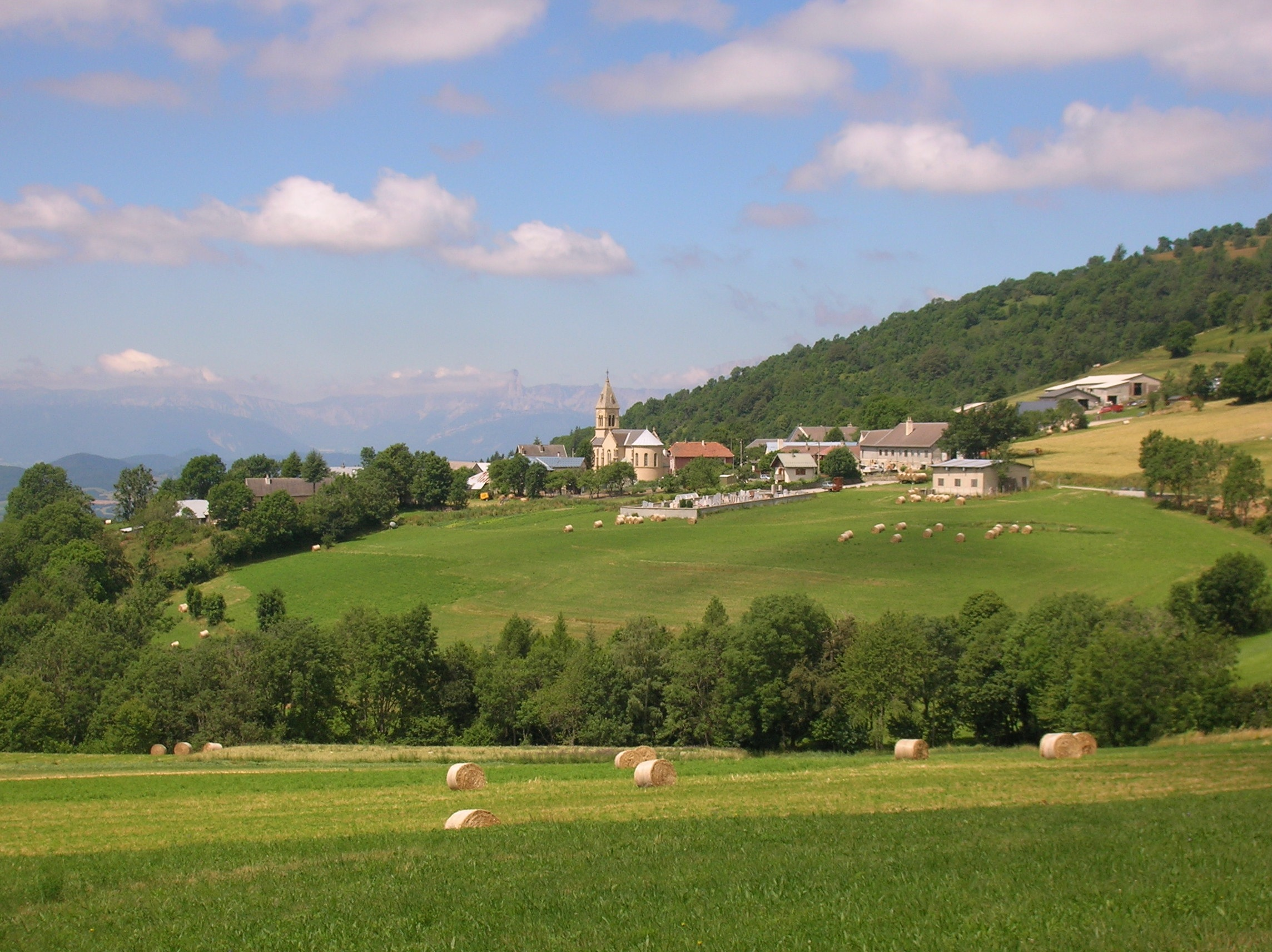
- A general view of Saint-Michel-en-Beaumont
- Location of Saint-Michel-en-Beaumont
- Location within France Location within Auvergne-Rhône-Alpes
- Coordinates: 44°52′09″N 5°54′01″E
- Country: France
- Region: Auvergne-Rhône-Alpes
- Department: Isère
- Arrondissement: Grenoble
- Canton: Matheysine-Trièves

Government
  - Mayor (2020–2026): Christian Charles
- Area^{1}: 8 km^{2} (3.1 sq mi)
- Elevation: 1,200 m (3,900 ft)
- Highest elevation: 2,020 m (6,630 ft)
- Lowest elevation: 958 m (3,143 ft)
- Population (2023): 32
  - Density: 4.0/km^{2} (10/sq mi)
- Time zone: UTC+01:00 (CET)
  - Summer (DST): UTC+02:00 (CEST)
- INSEE/Postal code: 38428 /38350
- ^{1} French Land Register data, which excludes lakes, ponds, glaciers > 1 km^{2} (0.386 sq mi or 247 acres) and river estuaries.

Saint-Michel-en-Beaumont is a commune in the Isère department in southeastern France.

== Population ==
Historical population
Year	Pop.	±% p.a.
1968	65	—
1975	55	−2.36%
1982	48	−1.93%
1990	30	−5.71%
1999	30	+0.00%
2007	35	+1.95%
2012	35	+0.00%
2017	31	−2.40%
2023	32	+0.53%
Source: INSEE

== See also ==
- Communes of the Isère department
