= Quet-en-Beaumont =

- Commune
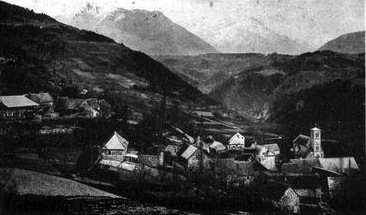
- Quet-en-Beaumont at the start of the 20th century
- Location of Quet-en-Beaumont
- Location within France Location within Auvergne-Rhône-Alpes
- Coordinates: 44°50′03″N 5°52′26″E
- Country: France
- Region: Auvergne-Rhône-Alpes
- Department: Isère
- Arrondissement: Grenoble
- Canton: Matheysine-Trièves

Government
  - Mayor (2020–2026): Elisabeth Mostacchi
- Area^{1}: 8.1 km^{2} (3.1 sq mi)
- Highest elevation: 1,664 m (5,459 ft)
- Lowest elevation: 581 m (1,906 ft)
- Population (2023): 79
  - Density: 9.8/km^{2} (25/sq mi)
- Time zone: UTC+01:00 (CET)
  - Summer (DST): UTC+02:00 (CEST)
- INSEE/Postal code: 38329 /38970
- ^{1} French Land Register data, which excludes lakes, ponds, glaciers > 1 km^{2} (0.386 sq mi or 247 acres) and river estuaries.

Quet-en-Beaumont (French pronunciation: [kɛ ɑ̃ bomɔ̃]) is a commune in the Isère department in southeastern France.

== Population ==
Historical population
Year	Pop.	±% p.a.
1968	94	—
1975	46	−9.71%
1982	45	−0.31%
1990	36	−2.75%
1999	49	+3.48%
2007	65	+3.60%
2012	62	−0.94%
2017	67	+1.56%
2023	79	+2.78%
Source: INSEE

== See also ==
- Communes of the Isère department
