= Les Côtes-de-Corps =

- Commune
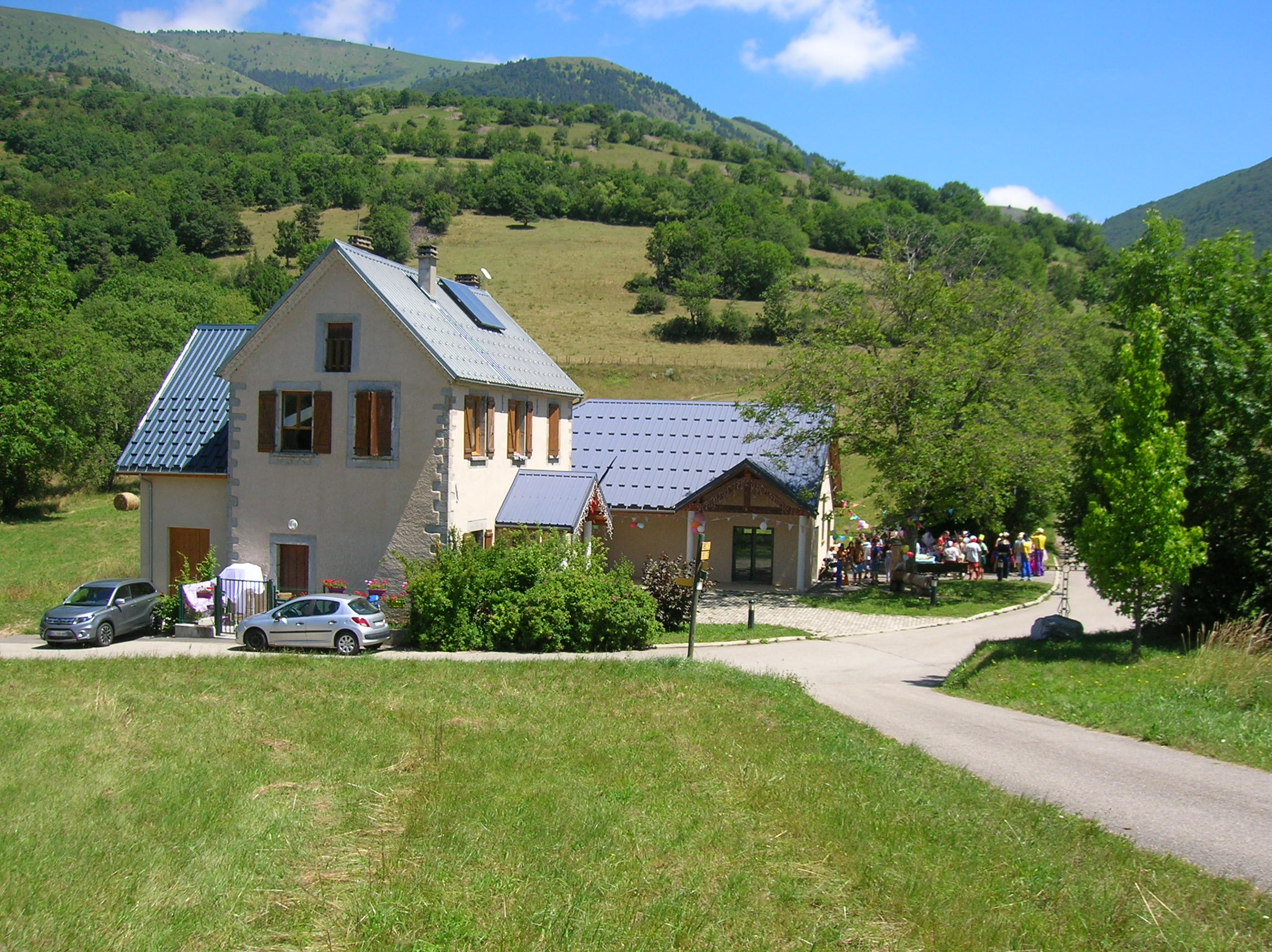
- The town hall of Les Côtes-de-Corps
- Location of Les Côtes-de-Corps
- Location within France Location within Auvergne-Rhône-Alpes
- Coordinates: 44°50′00″N 5°55′25″E
- Country: France
- Region: Auvergne-Rhône-Alpes
- Department: Isère
- Arrondissement: Grenoble
- Canton: Matheysine-Trièves

Government
  - Mayor (2020–2026): Claude-Emmanuel Mauroy
- Area^{1}: 10 km^{2} (3.9 sq mi)
- Elevation: 930 m (3,050 ft)
- Highest elevation: 2,015 m (6,611 ft)
- Lowest elevation: 680 m (2,230 ft)
- Population (2023): 74
  - Density: 7.4/km^{2} (19/sq mi)
- Time zone: UTC+01:00 (CET)
  - Summer (DST): UTC+02:00 (CEST)
- INSEE/Postal code: 38132 /38970
- ^{1} French Land Register data, which excludes lakes, ponds, glaciers > 1 km^{2} (0.386 sq mi or 247 acres) and river estuaries.

Les Côtes-de-Corps (French pronunciation: [le kot də kɔʁ], literally The Slopes of Corps; Occitan: Las Còstas de Còrb) is a commune in the Isère department in southeastern France.

== Population ==
Historical population
Year	Pop.	±% p.a.
1968	87	—
1975	77	−1.73%
1982	84	+1.25%
1990	50	−6.28%
1999	44	−1.41%
2007	59	+3.73%
2012	65	+1.96%
2017	70	+1.49%
2023	74	+0.93%
Source: INSEE

== See also ==
- Communes of the Isère department
