= Saint-Pierre-de-Méaroz =

- Commune
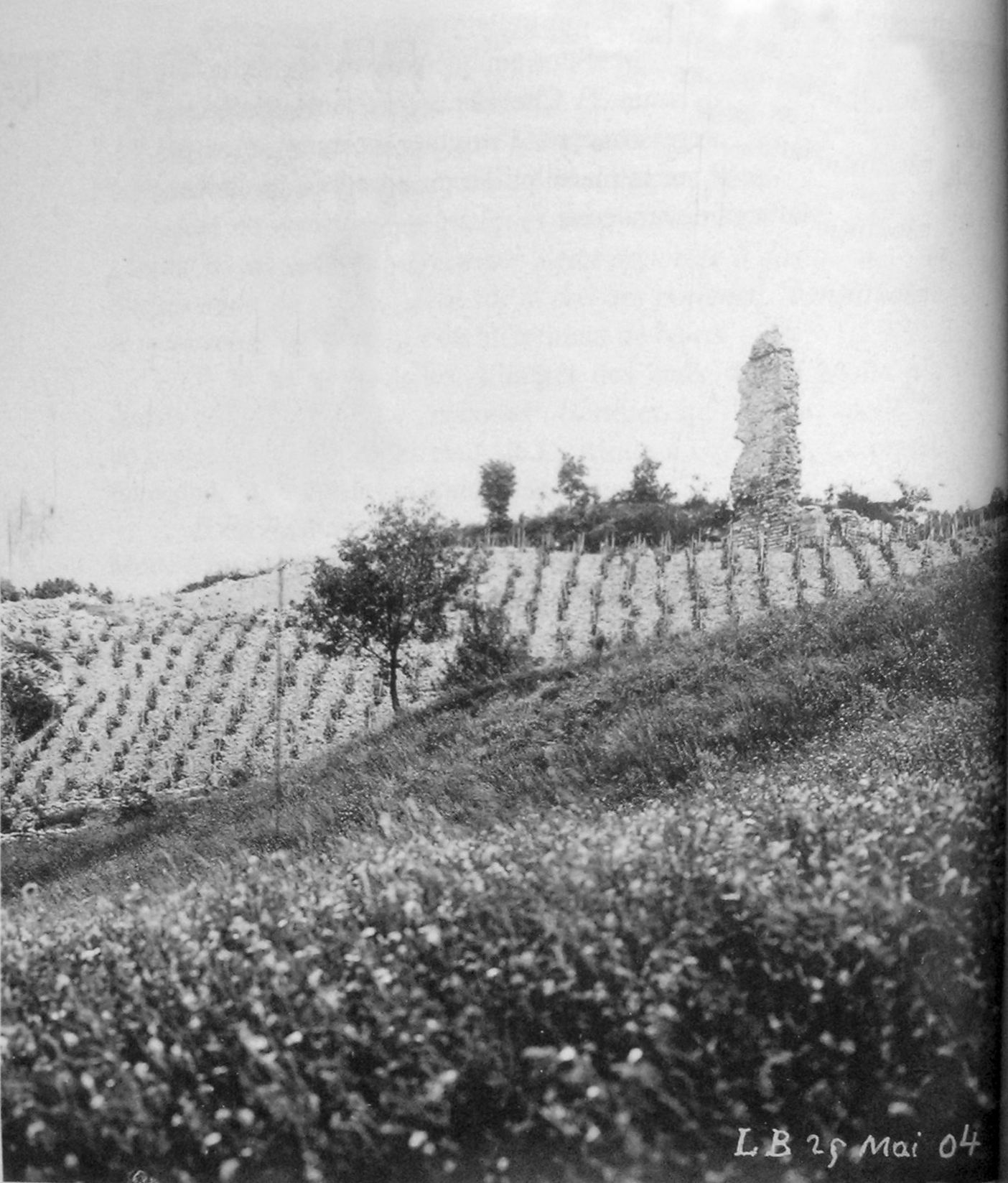
- The chateau of Le Bas-Beaumont in 1904
- Location of Saint-Pierre-de-Méaroz
- Location within France Location within Auvergne-Rhône-Alpes
- Coordinates: 44°52′33″N 5°49′28″E
- Country: France
- Region: Auvergne-Rhône-Alpes
- Department: Isère
- Arrondissement: Grenoble
- Canton: Matheysine-Trièves

Government
  - Mayor (2020–2026): Eric Balme
- Area^{1}: 5 km^{2} (1.9 sq mi)
- Elevation: 740 m (2,430 ft)
- Highest elevation: 868 m (2,848 ft)
- Lowest elevation: 508 m (1,667 ft)
- Population (2023): 114
  - Density: 23/km^{2} (59/sq mi)
- Time zone: UTC+01:00 (CET)
  - Summer (DST): UTC+02:00 (CEST)
- INSEE/Postal code: 38444 /38350
- ^{1} French Land Register data, which excludes lakes, ponds, glaciers > 1 km^{2} (0.386 sq mi or 247 acres) and river estuaries.

Saint-Pierre-de-Méaroz (Vivaro-Alpine: Sant Pèire de Mearòtz) is a commune in the Isère department in southeastern France.

== Population ==
Historical population
Year	Pop.	±% p.a.
1968	86	—
1975	66	−3.71%
1982	82	+3.15%
1990	110	+3.74%
1999	104	−0.62%
2007	132	+3.02%
2012	135	+0.45%
2017	126	−1.37%
2023	114	−1.65%
Source: INSEE

== See also ==
- Communes of the Isère department
