= Nantes-en-Ratier =

- Commune
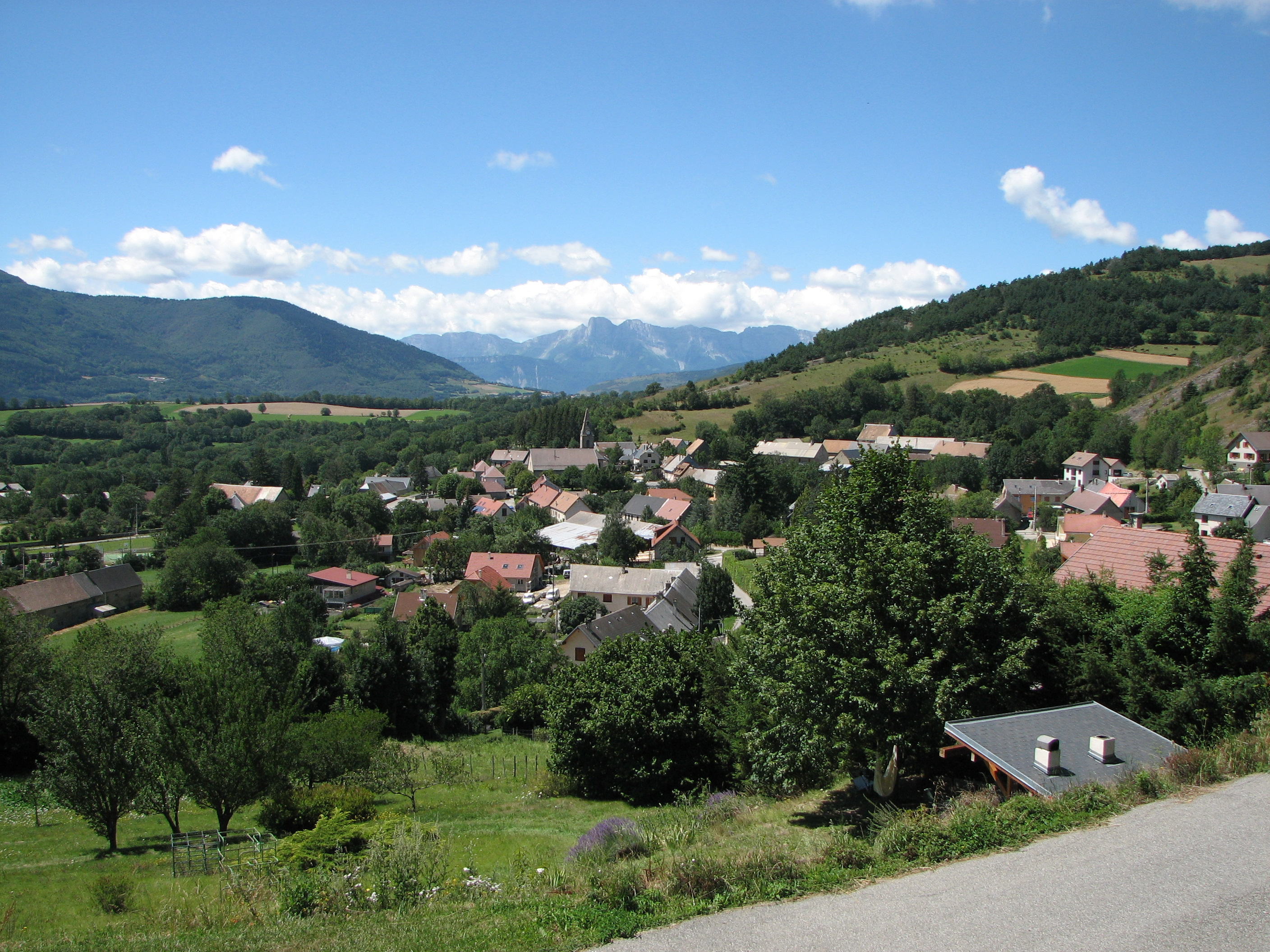
- A general view of Nantes-en-Ratier
- Location of Nantes-en-Ratier
- Location within France Location within Auvergne-Rhône-Alpes
- Coordinates: 44°56′10″N 5°49′39″E
- Country: France
- Region: Auvergne-Rhône-Alpes
- Department: Isère
- Arrondissement: Grenoble
- Canton: Matheysine-Trièves

Government
  - Mayor (2020–2026): Joël Pontier
- Area^{1}: 12 km^{2} (4.6 sq mi)
- Elevation: 930 m (3,050 ft)
- Highest elevation: 1,975 m (6,480 ft)
- Lowest elevation: 587 m (1,926 ft)
- Population (2023): 476
  - Density: 40/km^{2} (100/sq mi)
- Time zone: UTC+01:00 (CET)
  - Summer (DST): UTC+02:00 (CEST)
- INSEE/Postal code: 38273 /38350
- ^{1} French Land Register data, which excludes lakes, ponds, glaciers > 1 km^{2} (0.386 sq mi or 247 acres) and river estuaries.

Nantes-en-Ratier (French pronunciation: [nˈɑ̃t ɑ̃ ʁatjˈe]) is a commune in the Isère department in southeastern France.

== Population ==
Historical population
Year	Pop.	±% p.a.
1968	367	—
1975	333	−1.38%
1982	333	+0.00%
1990	372	+1.39%
1999	389	+0.50%
2007	461	+2.15%
2012	477	+0.68%
2017	466	−0.47%
2023	476	+0.35%
Source: INSEE

== See also ==
- Communes of the Isère department
