= Tréminis =

- Commune
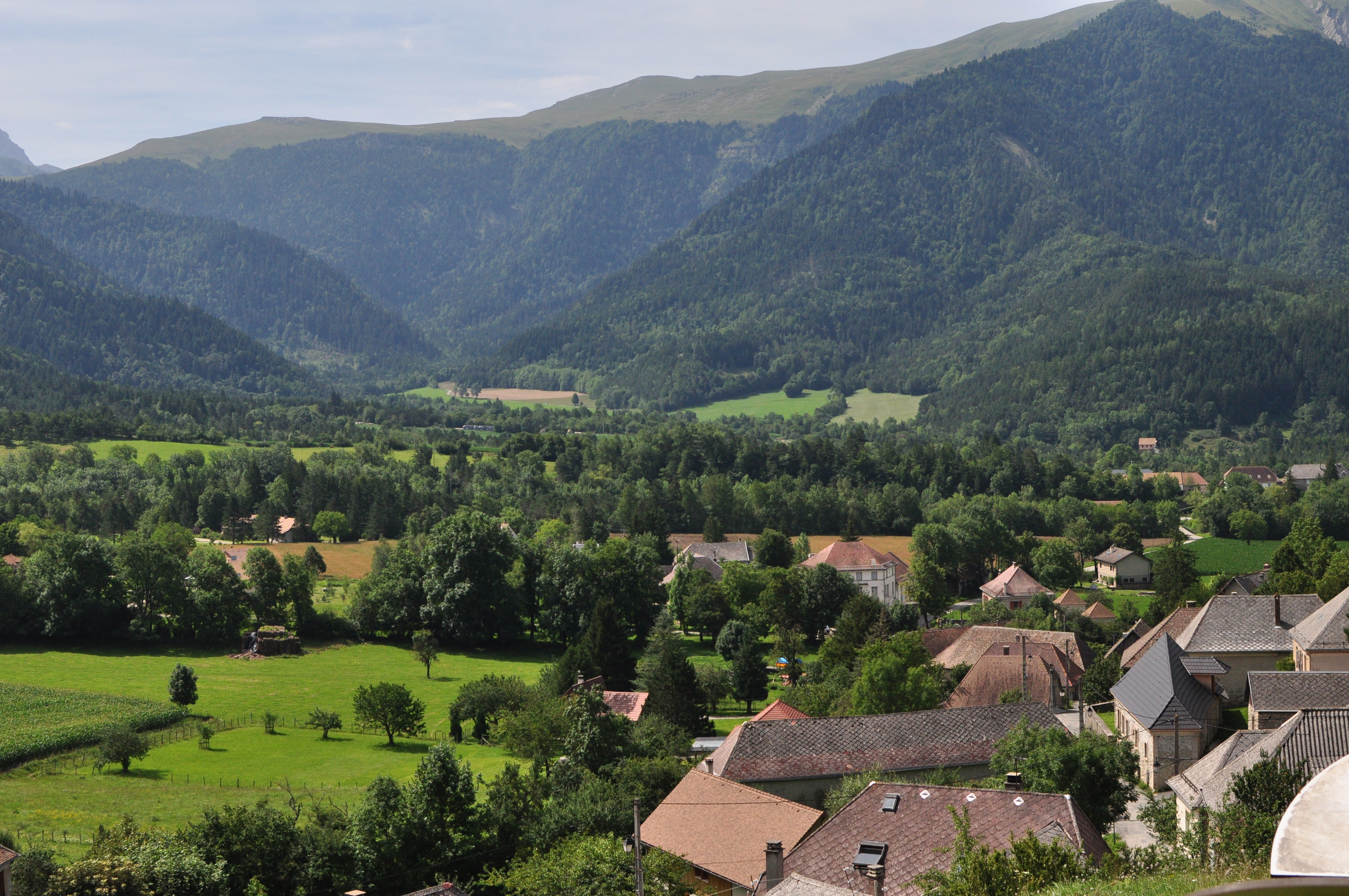
- A general view of Tréminis
- Location of Tréminis
- Location within France Location within Auvergne-Rhône-Alpes
- Coordinates: 44°44′54″N 5°46′11″E
- Country: France
- Region: Auvergne-Rhône-Alpes
- Department: Isère
- Arrondissement: Grenoble
- Canton: Matheysine-Trièves
- Intercommunality: Trièves

Government
  - Mayor (2020–2026): Anne-Marie Fitoussi
- Area^{1}: 49 km^{2} (19 sq mi)
- Elevation: 933 m (3,061 ft)
- Highest elevation: 2,755 m (9,039 ft)
- Lowest elevation: 792 m (2,598 ft)
- Population (2023): 198
  - Density: 4.0/km^{2} (10/sq mi)
- Time zone: UTC+01:00 (CET)
  - Summer (DST): UTC+02:00 (CEST)
- INSEE/Postal code: 38514 /38710
- ^{1} French Land Register data, which excludes lakes, ponds, glaciers > 1 km^{2} (0.386 sq mi or 247 acres) and river estuaries.

Tréminis is a commune in the Isère department in southeastern France.

== Population ==
Historical population
Year	Pop.	±% p.a.
1968	260	—
1975	207	−3.20%
1982	191	−1.14%
1990	173	−1.23%
1999	172	−0.06%
2007	164	−0.59%
2012	178	+1.65%
2017	178	+0.00%
2023	198	+1.79%
Source: INSEE

== See also ==
- Communes of the Isère department
