= Susville =

- Commune
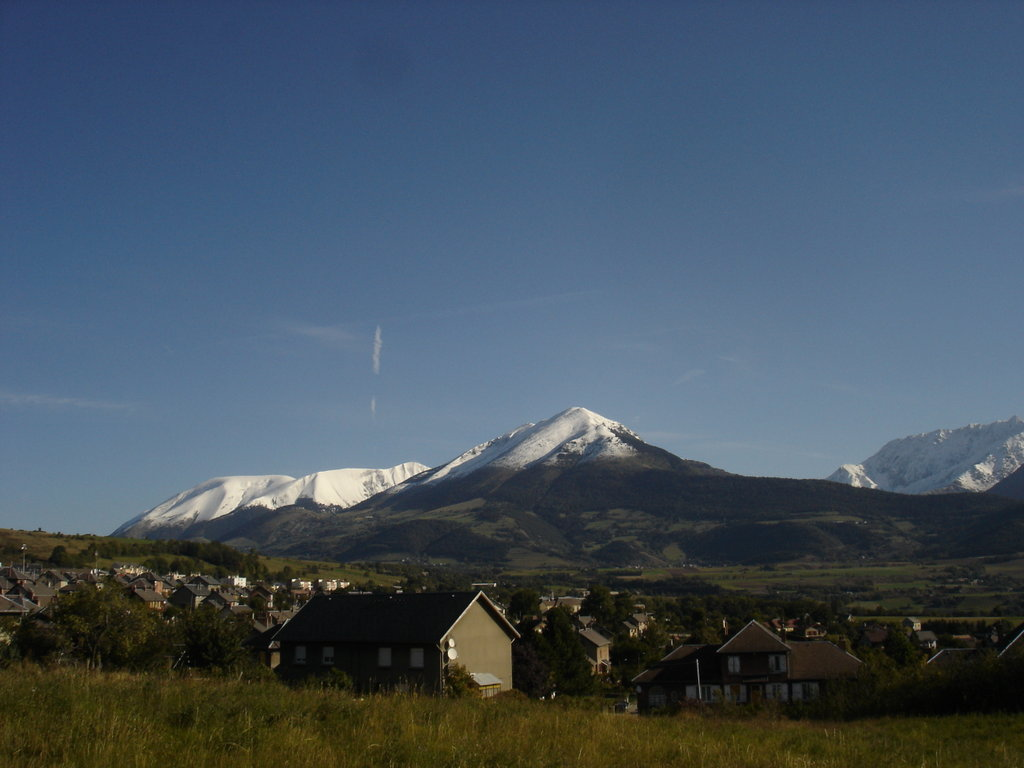
- A general view of Susville
- Location of Susville
- Location within France Location within Auvergne-Rhône-Alpes
- Coordinates: 44°55′00″N 5°46′52″E
- Country: France
- Region: Auvergne-Rhône-Alpes
- Department: Isère
- Arrondissement: Grenoble
- Canton: Matheysine-Trièves
- Intercommunality: La Matheysine

Government
  - Mayor (2024–2026): Valérie Challon
- Area^{1}: 10 km^{2} (3.9 sq mi)
- Elevation: 910 m (2,990 ft)
- Highest elevation: 1,600 m (5,200 ft)
- Lowest elevation: 874 m (2,867 ft)
- Population (2023): 1,134
  - Density: 110/km^{2} (290/sq mi)
- Time zone: UTC+01:00 (CET)
  - Summer (DST): UTC+02:00 (CEST)
- INSEE/Postal code: 38499 /38350
- ^{1} French Land Register data, which excludes lakes, ponds, glaciers > 1 km^{2} (0.386 sq mi or 247 acres) and river estuaries.

Susville is a commune in the Isère department in southeastern France.

== Population ==
Historical population
Year	Pop.	±% p.a.
1968	1,611	—
1975	1,299	−3.03%
1982	1,540	+2.46%
1990	1,430	−0.92%
1999	1,472	+0.32%
2007	1,427	−0.39%
2012	1,371	−0.80%
2017	1,272	−1.49%
2023	1,134	−1.90%
Source: INSEE

== See also ==
- Communes of the Isère department
