= Cholonge =

- Commune
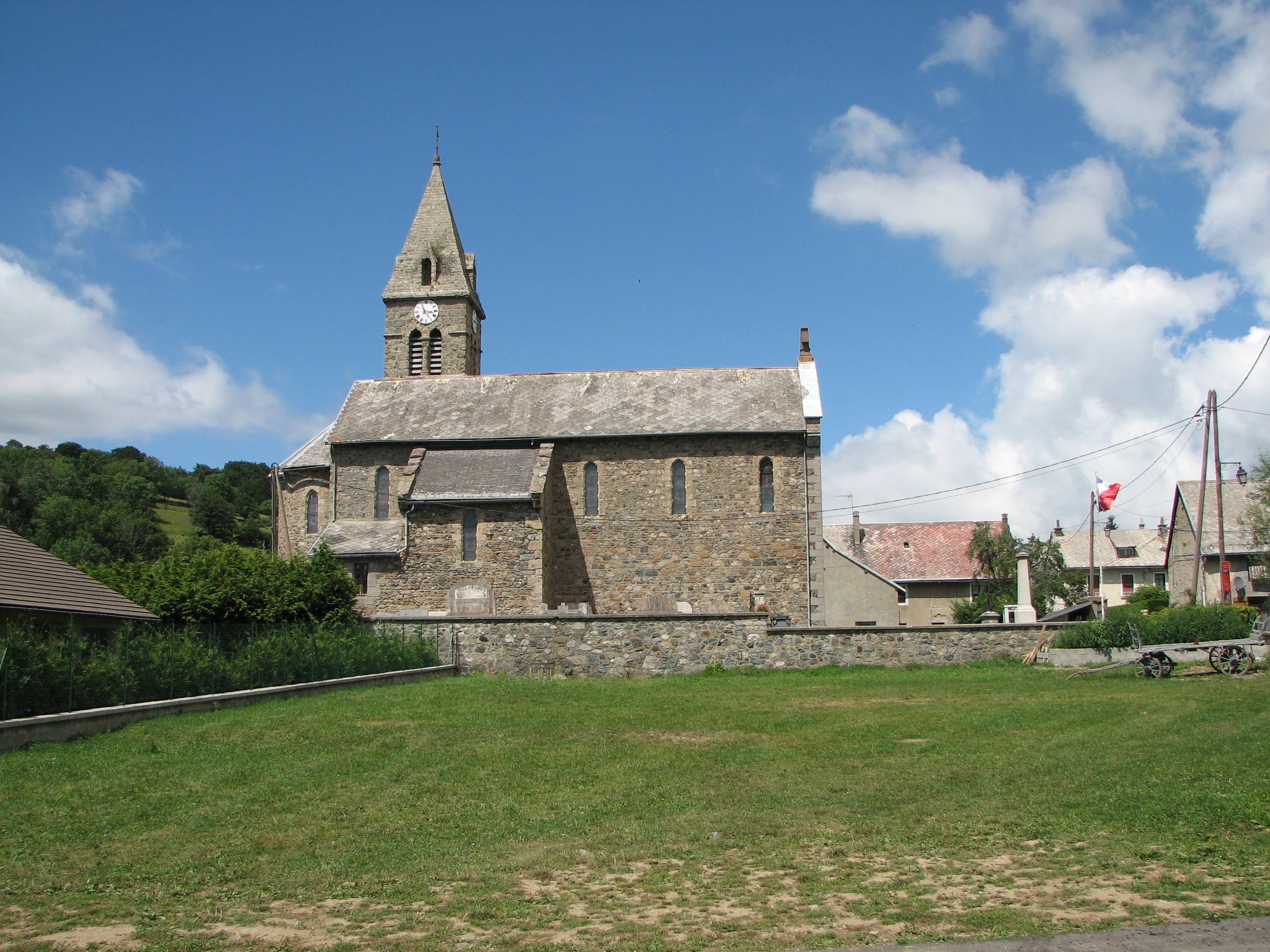
- The church of Cholonge
- Location of Cholonge
- Location within France Location within Auvergne-Rhône-Alpes
- Coordinates: 45°00′18″N 5°47′51″E
- Country: France
- Region: Auvergne-Rhône-Alpes
- Department: Isère
- Arrondissement: Grenoble
- Canton: Matheysine-Trièves
- Intercommunality: La Matheysine

Government
  - Mayor (2020–2026): Bruno Kramarczewski
- Area^{1}: 9 km^{2} (3.5 sq mi)
- Highest elevation: 2,140 m (7,020 ft)
- Lowest elevation: 905 m (2,969 ft)
- Population (2023): 339
  - Density: 38/km^{2} (98/sq mi)
- Time zone: UTC+01:00 (CET)
  - Summer (DST): UTC+02:00 (CEST)
- INSEE/Postal code: 38106 /38220
- ^{1} French Land Register data, which excludes lakes, ponds, glaciers > 1 km^{2} (0.386 sq mi or 247 acres) and river estuaries.

Cholonge (French pronunciation: [ʃɔlɔ̃ʒ]) is a commune in the Isère department in southeastern France.

== Population ==
Historical population
Year	Pop.	±% p.a.
1968	124	—
1975	128	+0.45%
1982	139	+1.18%
1990	161	+1.85%
1999	229	+3.99%
2007	305	+3.65%
2012	332	+1.71%
2017	329	−0.18%
2023	339	+0.50%
Source: INSEE

== See also ==
- Communes of the Isère department
