= Villard-Saint-Christophe =

- Commune
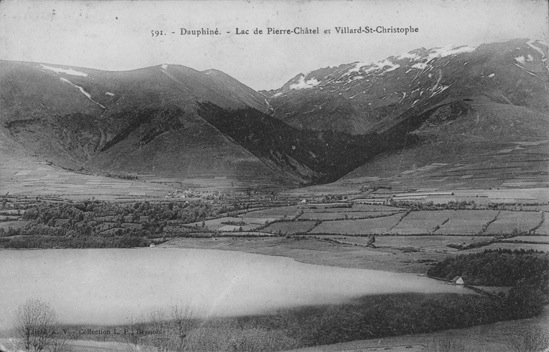
- Villard-Saint-Cristophe and the Pierre-Châtel Lake at the start of the 20th century

- Coat of arms
- Location of Villard-Saint-Christophe
- Location within France Location within Auvergne-Rhône-Alpes
- Coordinates: 44°58′47″N 5°48′23″E
- Country: France
- Region: Auvergne-Rhône-Alpes
- Department: Isère
- Arrondissement: Grenoble
- Canton: Matheysine-Trièves
- Intercommunality: La Matheysine

Government
  - Mayor (2020–2026): Serge Mora
- Area^{1}: 14 km^{2} (5.4 sq mi)
- Elevation: 1,071 m (3,514 ft)
- Highest elevation: 2,176 m (7,139 ft)
- Lowest elevation: 940 m (3,080 ft)
- Population (2023): 397
  - Density: 28/km^{2} (73/sq mi)
- Time zone: UTC+01:00 (CET)
  - Summer (DST): UTC+02:00 (CEST)
- INSEE/Postal code: 38552 /38119
- ^{1} French Land Register data, which excludes lakes, ponds, glaciers > 1 km^{2} (0.386 sq mi or 247 acres) and river estuaries.

Villard-Saint-Christophe (French pronunciation: [vilaʁ sɛ̃ kʁistɔf]) is a commune in the Isère department in southeastern France.

== Population ==
Historical population
Year	Pop.	±% p.a.
1968	229	—
1975	199	−1.99%
1982	216	+1.18%
1990	226	+0.57%
1999	272	+2.08%
2007	339	+2.79%
2012	402	+3.47%
2017	406	+0.20%
2023	397	−0.37%
Source: INSEE

== See also ==
- Communes of the Isère department
