= Roissard =

- Commune
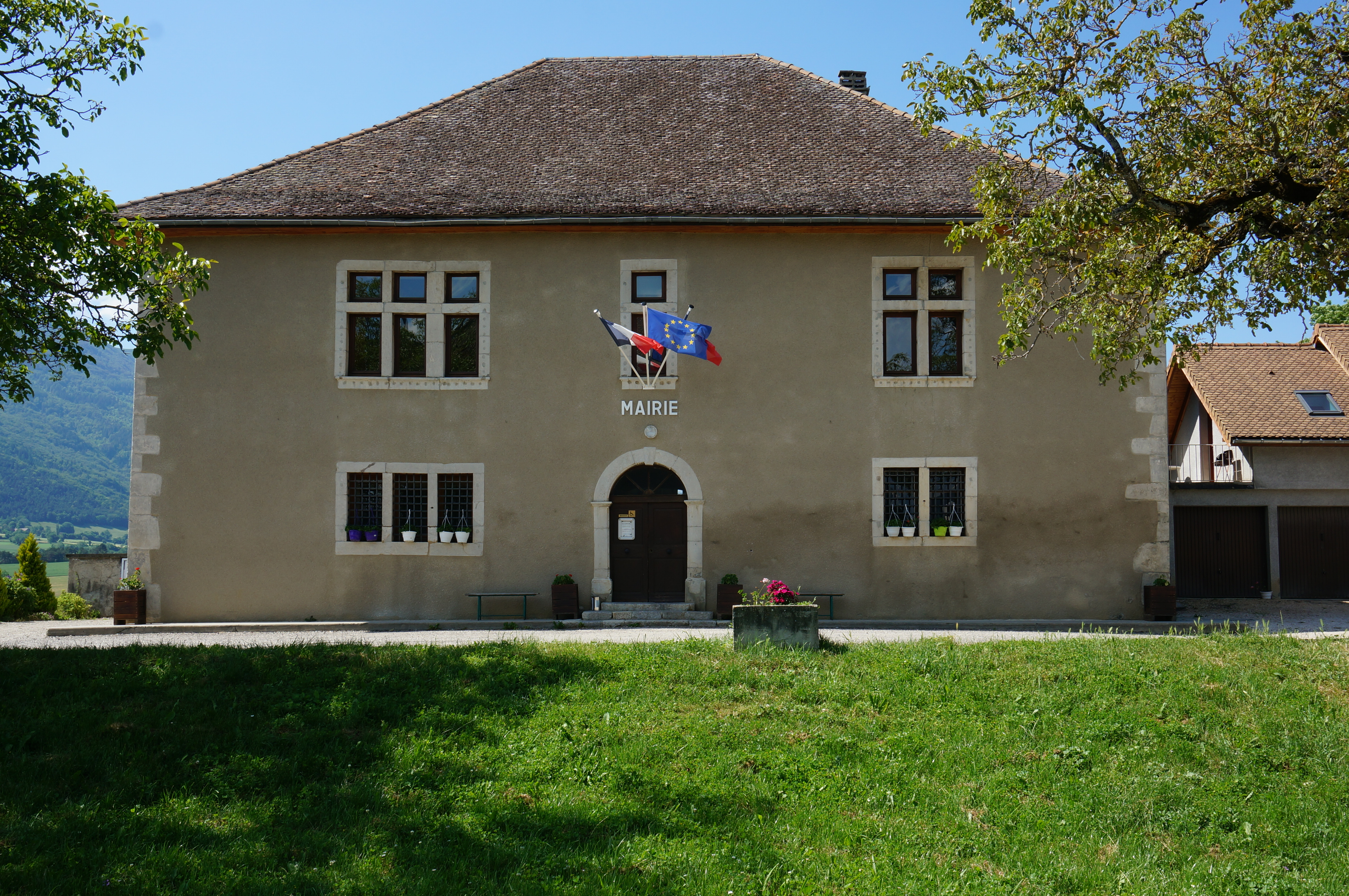
- Town hall
- Location of Roissard
- Location within France Location within Auvergne-Rhône-Alpes
- Coordinates: 44°52′59″N 5°38′26″E
- Country: France
- Region: Auvergne-Rhône-Alpes
- Department: Isère
- Arrondissement: Grenoble
- Canton: Matheysine-Trièves

Government
  - Mayor (2020–2026): Christophe Drure
- Area^{1}: 14 km^{2} (5.4 sq mi)
- Highest elevation: 1,800 m (5,900 ft)
- Lowest elevation: 486 m (1,594 ft)
- Population (2023): 324
  - Density: 23/km^{2} (60/sq mi)
- Time zone: UTC+01:00 (CET)
  - Summer (DST): UTC+02:00 (CEST)
- INSEE/Postal code: 38342 /38650
- ^{1} French Land Register data, which excludes lakes, ponds, glaciers > 1 km^{2} (0.386 sq mi or 247 acres) and river estuaries.

Roissard (French pronunciation: [ʁwasaʁ]) is a commune in the Isère department in southeastern France.

== Population ==
Historical population
| Year | Pop. | ±% p.a. |
|---|---|---|
| 1968 | 136 | — |
| 1975 | 95 | −5.00% |
| 1982 | 141 | +5.80% |
| 1990 | 199 | +4.40% |
| 1999 | 193 | −0.34% |
| 2007 | 227 | +2.05% |
| 2012 | 264 | +3.07% |
| 2017 | 306 | +3.00% |
| 2023 | 324 | +0.96% |
Source: INSEE

== See also ==
- Communes of the Isère department
