= Cognet, Isère =

Cognet
- Commune
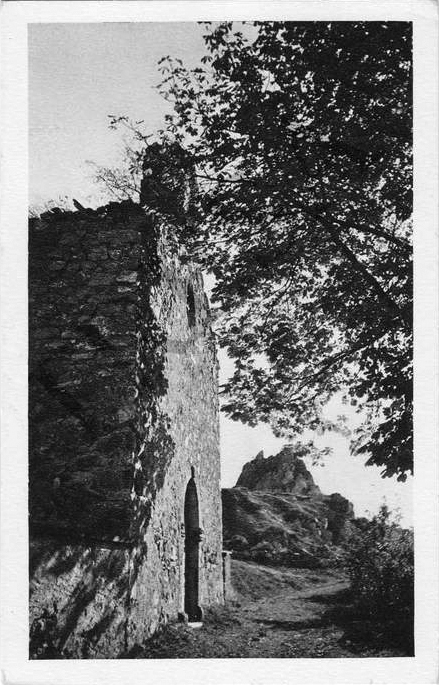
- The old chapel at the beginning of the 20th century
- Location of Cognet
- Location within France Location within Auvergne-Rhône-Alpes
- Coordinates: 44°52′55″N 5°46′40″E
- Country: France
- Region: Auvergne-Rhône-Alpes
- Department: Isère
- Arrondissement: Grenoble
- Canton: Matheysine-Trièves

Government
  - Mayor (2020–2026): Jean-Pierre Bonomi
- Area^{1}: 2 km^{2} (0.77 sq mi)
- Highest elevation: 920 m (3,020 ft)
- Lowest elevation: 491 m (1,611 ft)
- Population (2023): 35
  - Density: 18/km^{2} (45/sq mi)
- Time zone: UTC+01:00 (CET)
  - Summer (DST): UTC+02:00 (CEST)
- INSEE/Postal code: 38116 /38350
- ^{1} French Land Register data, which excludes lakes, ponds, glaciers > 1 km^{2} (0.386 sq mi or 247 acres) and river estuaries.

Cognet (French pronunciation: [kɔɲɛ]) is a commune in the Isère department in southeastern France.

== Population ==
Historical population
Year	Pop.	±% p.a.
1968	47	—
1975	28	−7.13%
1982	30	+0.99%
1990	40	+3.66%
1999	36	−1.16%
2007	48	+3.66%
2012	48	+0.00%
2017	42	−2.64%
2023	35	−2.99%
Source: INSEE

== See also ==
- Communes of the Isère department
