= Le Percy =

- Commune
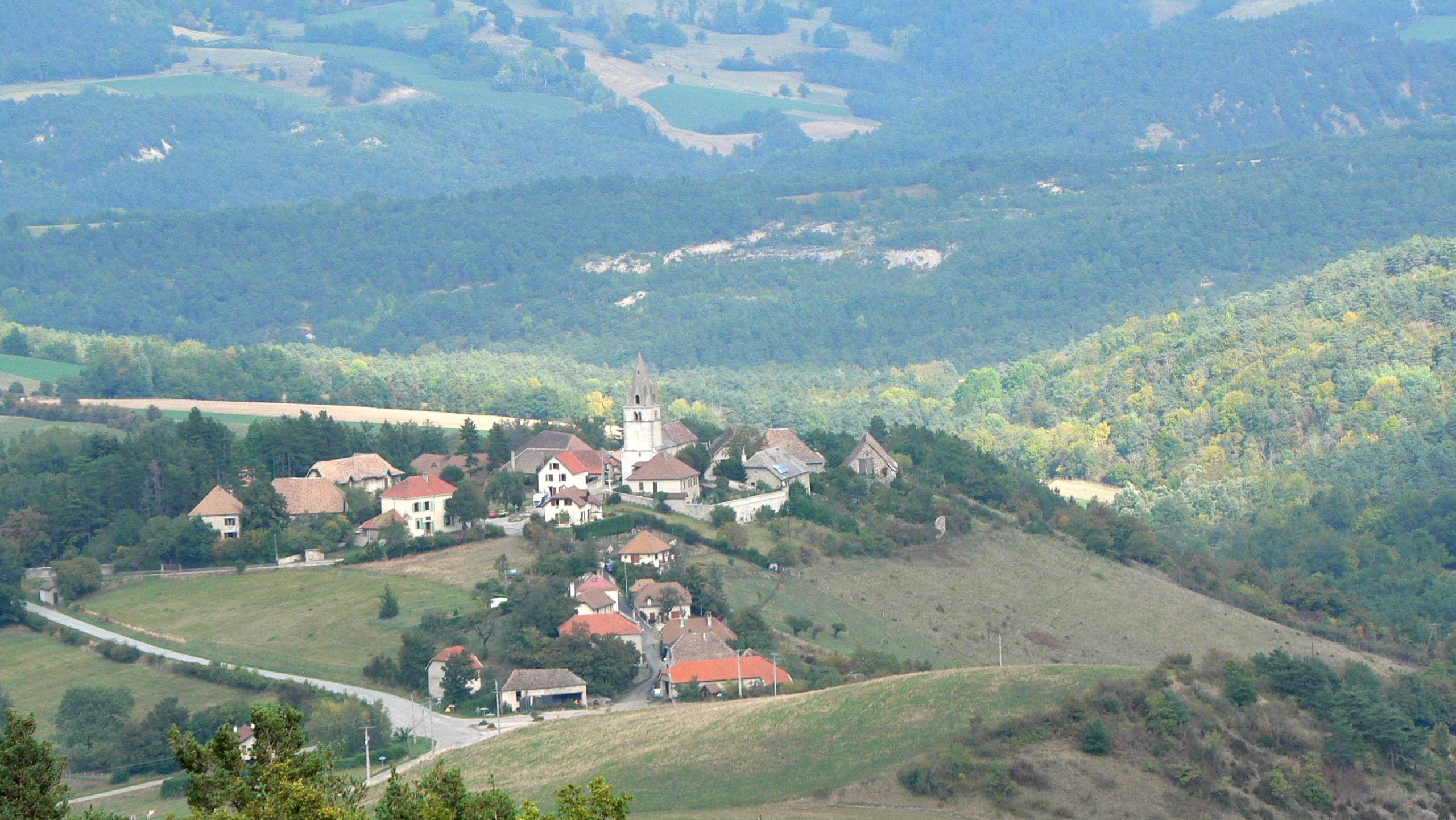
- A general view of Percy
- Location of Le Percy
- Location within France Location within Auvergne-Rhône-Alpes
- Coordinates: 44°48′02″N 5°38′56″E
- Country: France
- Region: Auvergne-Rhône-Alpes
- Department: Isère
- Arrondissement: Grenoble
- Canton: Matheysine-Trièves
- Intercommunality: Trièves

Government
  - Mayor (2020–2026): Sabine Campredon
- Area^{1}: 15.93 km^{2} (6.15 sq mi)
- Highest elevation: 1,880 m (6,170 ft)
- Lowest elevation: 591 m (1,939 ft)
- Population (2023): 167
  - Density: 10.5/km^{2} (27.2/sq mi)
- Time zone: UTC+01:00 (CET)
  - Summer (DST): UTC+02:00 (CEST)
- INSEE/Postal code: 38301 /38930
- ^{1} French Land Register data, which excludes lakes, ponds, glaciers > 1 km^{2} (0.386 sq mi or 247 acres) and river estuaries.

Le Percy (French pronunciation: [lə pɛʁsi], known as Percy until 31 December 2022) is a commune in the Isère department in southeastern France.

== Population ==
Historical population
Year	Pop.	±% p.a.
1968	68	—
1975	66	−0.43%
1982	77	+2.23%
1990	101	+3.45%
1999	111	+1.05%
2007	117	+0.66%
2012	152	+5.37%
2017	172	+2.50%
2023	167	−0.49%
Source: INSEE

== Politics and administration ==
List of successive mayors
Period	Identity
2001-2008	Capuchin Le Douarin
2008-2017	Guillaume Gontard
2017-in progress	Sabine Campredon

== See also ==
- Communes of the Isère department
- Parc naturel régional du Vercors
