= Lalley =

- Commune
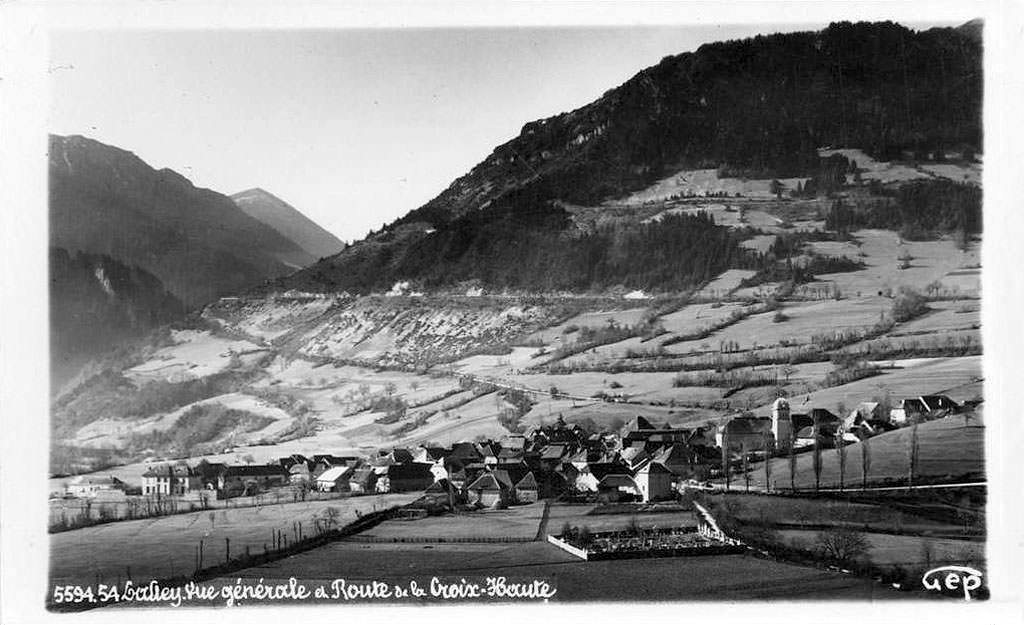
- Lalley in the early 20th century
- Location of Lalley
- Location within France Location within Auvergne-Rhône-Alpes
- Coordinates: 44°45′31″N 5°40′37″E
- Country: France
- Region: Auvergne-Rhône-Alpes
- Department: Isère
- Arrondissement: Grenoble
- Canton: Matheysine-Trièves
- Intercommunality: Trièves

Government
  - Mayor (2022–2026): Marie-Pierre Drain
- Area^{1}: 24 km^{2} (9.3 sq mi)
- Highest elevation: 2,045 m (6,709 ft)
- Lowest elevation: 673 m (2,208 ft)
- Population (2023): 178
  - Density: 7.4/km^{2} (19/sq mi)
- Time zone: UTC+01:00 (CET)
  - Summer (DST): UTC+02:00 (CEST)
- INSEE/Postal code: 38204 /38930
- ^{1} French Land Register data, which excludes lakes, ponds, glaciers > 1 km^{2} (0.386 sq mi or 247 acres) and river estuaries.

Lalley (French pronunciation: [lalɛ]) is a commune in the Isère department in southeastern France.

== Population ==
Historical population
Year	Pop.	±% p.a.
1968	258	—
1975	273	+0.81%
1982	257	−0.86%
1990	191	−3.64%
1999	184	−0.41%
2007	194	+0.66%
2012	222	+2.73%
2017	193	−2.76%
2023	178	−1.34%
Source: INSEE

== See also ==
- Communes of the Isère department
