= Saint-Guillaume =

- Commune
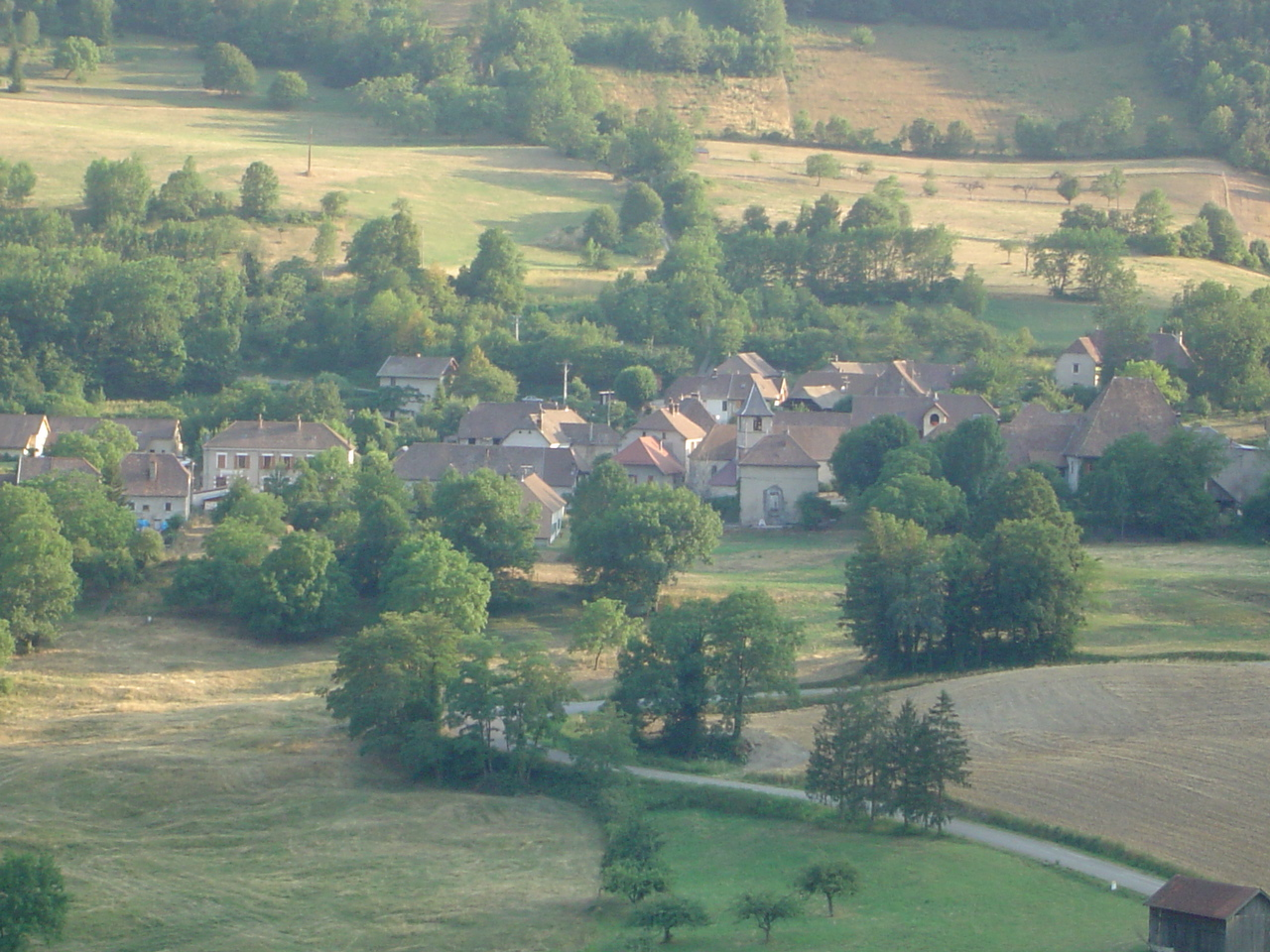
- A general view of Saint-Guillaume
- Location of Saint-Guillaume
- Location within France Location within Auvergne-Rhône-Alpes
- Coordinates: 44°57′21″N 5°35′22″E
- Country: France
- Region: Auvergne-Rhône-Alpes
- Department: Isère
- Arrondissement: Grenoble
- Canton: Matheysine-Trièves
- Intercommunality: Trièves

Government
  - Mayor (2020–2026): David Piccarreta
- Area^{1}: 13 km^{2} (5.0 sq mi)
- Highest elevation: 1,733 m (5,686 ft)
- Lowest elevation: 550 m (1,800 ft)
- Population (2023): 238
  - Density: 18/km^{2} (47/sq mi)
- Time zone: UTC+01:00 (CET)
  - Summer (DST): UTC+02:00 (CEST)
- INSEE/Postal code: 38391 /38650
- ^{1} French Land Register data, which excludes lakes, ponds, glaciers > 1 km^{2} (0.386 sq mi or 247 acres) and river estuaries.

Saint-Guillaume (French pronunciation: [sɛ̃ ɡijom]) is a commune in the Isère department in southeastern France.

== Population ==
Historical population
| Year | Pop. | ±% p.a. |
|---|---|---|
| 1968 | 144 | — |
| 1975 | 132 | −1.24% |
| 1982 | 160 | +2.79% |
| 1990 | 235 | +4.92% |
| 1999 | 270 | +1.55% |
| 2007 | 254 | −0.76% |
| 2012 | 283 | +2.19% |
| 2017 | 258 | −1.83% |
| 2023 | 238 | −1.34% |
Source: INSEE

== See also ==
- Communes of the Isère department
- Parc naturel régional du Vercors
