= Saint-Andéol, Isère =

Saint-Andéol
- Commune
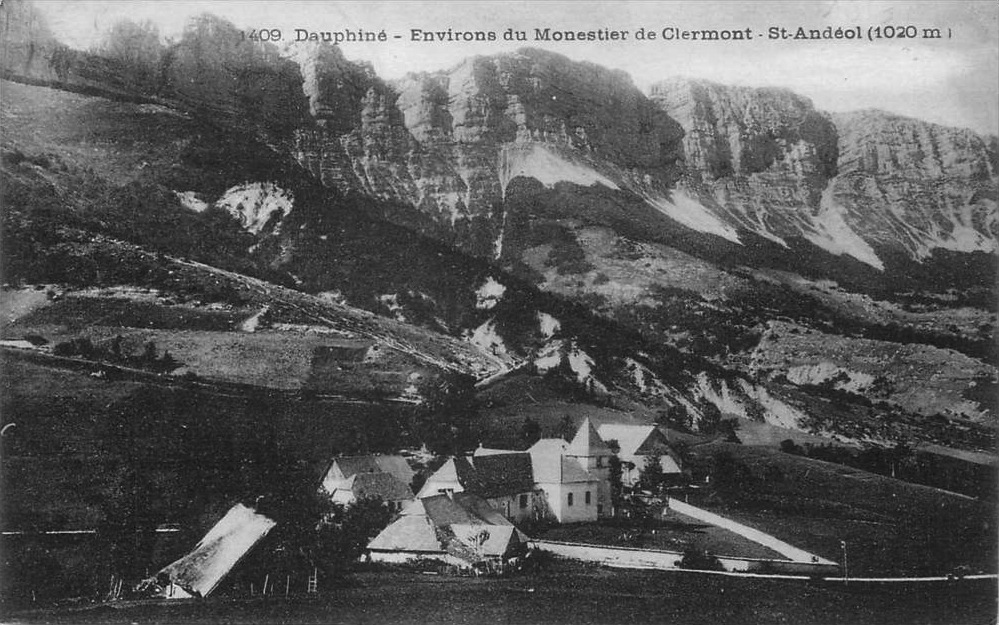
- Saint-Andéol in the early 20th century
- Location of Saint-Andéol
- Location within France Location within Auvergne-Rhône-Alpes
- Coordinates: 44°57′43″N 5°33′11″E
- Country: France
- Region: Auvergne-Rhône-Alpes
- Department: Isère
- Arrondissement: Grenoble
- Canton: Matheysine-Trièves

Government
  - Mayor (2020–2026): Gilles Cleret
- Area^{1}: 30 km^{2} (12 sq mi)
- Highest elevation: 2,087 m (6,847 ft)
- Lowest elevation: 792 m (2,598 ft)
- Population (2023): 117
  - Density: 3.9/km^{2} (10/sq mi)
- Time zone: UTC+01:00 (CET)
  - Summer (DST): UTC+02:00 (CEST)
- INSEE/Postal code: 38355 /38650
- ^{1} French Land Register data, which excludes lakes, ponds, glaciers > 1 km^{2} (0.386 sq mi or 247 acres) and river estuaries.

Saint-Andéol (French pronunciation: [sɛ̃.t‿ɑ̃deɔl]) is a commune in the Isère department in southeastern France.

== Population ==
Historical population
Year	Pop.	±% p.a.
1968	53	—
1975	68	+3.62%
1982	66	−0.43%
1990	92	+4.24%
1999	123	+3.28%
2007	114	−0.95%
2012	128	+2.34%
2017	122	−0.96%
2023	117	−0.70%
Source: INSEE

== See also ==
- Communes of the Isère department
- Parc naturel régional du Vercors
