= Saint-Jean-de-Vaulx =

- Commune
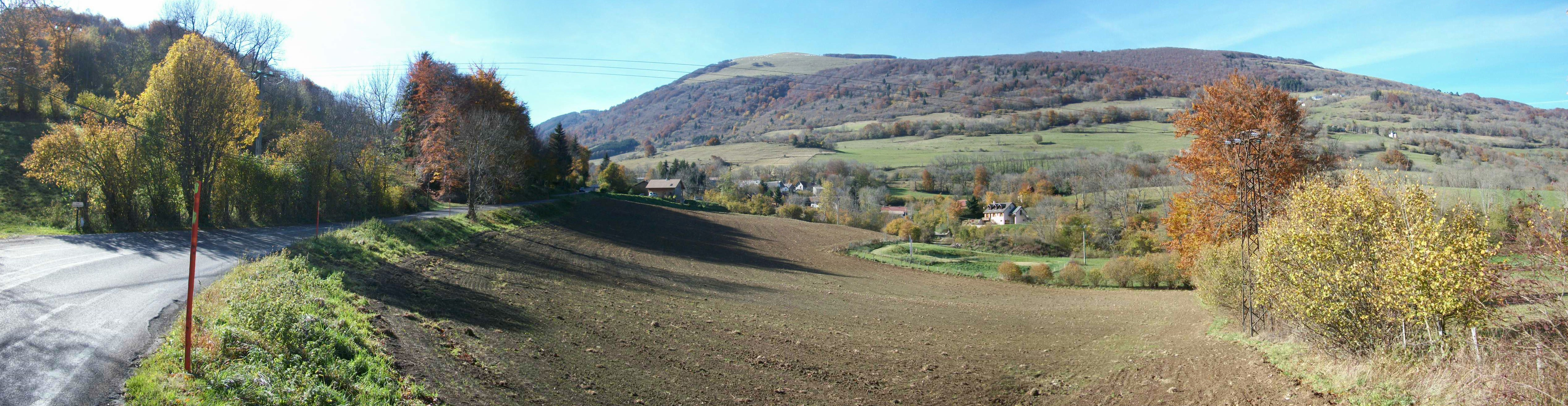
- A panoramic view of the hamlet of Les Pras
- Location of Saint-Jean-de-Vaulx
- Location within France Location within Auvergne-Rhône-Alpes
- Coordinates: 45°00′49″N 5°45′32″E
- Country: France
- Region: Auvergne-Rhône-Alpes
- Department: Isère
- Arrondissement: Grenoble
- Canton: Matheysine-Trièves
- Intercommunality: La Matheysine

Government
  - Mayor (2020–2026): Jean-Luc Ravanat
- Area^{1}: 10.73 km^{2} (4.14 sq mi)
- Elevation: 1,000 m (3,300 ft)
- Highest elevation: 1,631 m (5,351 ft)
- Lowest elevation: 890 m (2,920 ft)
- Population (2023): 536
  - Density: 50.0/km^{2} (129/sq mi)
- Time zone: UTC+01:00 (CET)
  - Summer (DST): UTC+02:00 (CEST)
- INSEE/Postal code: 38402 /38220
- ^{1} French Land Register data, which excludes lakes, ponds, glaciers > 1 km^{2} (0.386 sq mi or 247 acres) and river estuaries.

Saint-Jean-de-Vaulx (French pronunciation: [sɛ̃ ʒɑ̃ də vo]) is a commune in the Isère department in southeastern France. Saint-Jean-de-Vaulx is located in the French Alps and is home to Montagne du Conest.

== Population ==
Historical population
Year	Pop.	±% p.a.
1968	174	—
1975	131	−3.97%
1982	226	+8.10%
1990	331	+4.89%
1999	451	+3.50%
2007	509	+1.52%
2012	548	+1.49%
2017	532	−0.59%
2023	536	+0.12%
Source: INSEE

== See also ==
- Communes of the Isère department
