= Notre-Dame-de-Vaulx =

- Commune
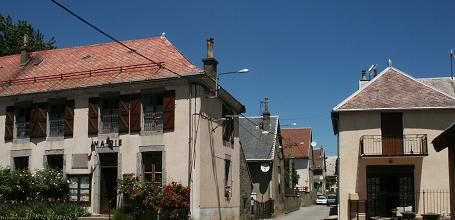
- Place de la mairie
- Location of Notre-Dame-de-Vaulx
- Location within France Location within Auvergne-Rhône-Alpes
- Coordinates: 44°59′14″N 5°44′59″E
- Country: France
- Region: Auvergne-Rhône-Alpes
- Department: Isère
- Arrondissement: Grenoble
- Canton: Matheysine-Trièves
- Intercommunality: La Matheysine

Government
  - Mayor (2022–2026): Bernadette Garcia
- Area^{1}: 8 km^{2} (3.1 sq mi)
- Highest elevation: 1,712 m (5,617 ft)
- Lowest elevation: 877 m (2,877 ft)
- Population (2023): 512
  - Density: 64/km^{2} (170/sq mi)
- Time zone: UTC+01:00 (CET)
  - Summer (DST): UTC+02:00 (CEST)
- INSEE/Postal code: 38280 /38144
- ^{1} French Land Register data, which excludes lakes, ponds, glaciers > 1 km^{2} (0.386 sq mi or 247 acres) and river estuaries.

Notre-Dame-de-Vaulx (French pronunciation: [nɔtʁ dam də vo], before 2001: Notre-Dame-de-Vaux) is a commune in the Isère department in southeastern France.

== Population ==
Historical population
Year	Pop.	±% p.a.
1968	416	—
1975	320	−3.68%
1982	306	−0.64%
1990	392	+3.14%
1999	495	+2.63%
2007	572	+1.82%
2012	531	−1.48%
2017	509	−0.84%
2023	512	+0.10%
Source: INSEE

== See also ==
- Communes of the Isère department
