= Oris-en-Rattier =

- Commune
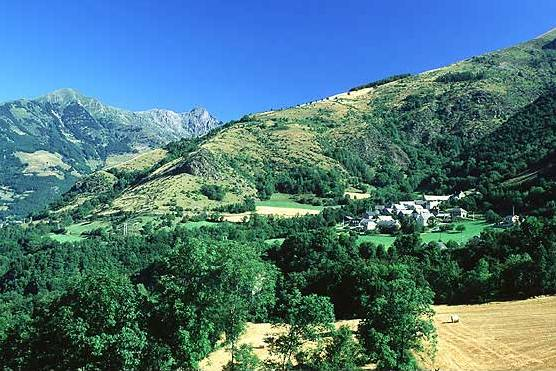
- A general view of Oris-en-Rattier
- Location of Oris-en-Rattier
- Location within France Location within Auvergne-Rhône-Alpes
- Coordinates: 44°55′19″N 5°52′14″E
- Country: France
- Region: Auvergne-Rhône-Alpes
- Department: Isère
- Arrondissement: Grenoble
- Canton: Matheysine-Trièves

Government
  - Mayor (2024–2026): Philippe Taverna
- Area^{1}: 18.83 km^{2} (7.27 sq mi)
- Elevation: 1,000 m (3,300 ft)
- Highest elevation: 2,606 m (8,550 ft)
- Lowest elevation: 768 m (2,520 ft)
- Population (2023): 108
  - Density: 5.74/km^{2} (14.9/sq mi)
- Time zone: UTC+01:00 (CET)
  - Summer (DST): UTC+02:00 (CEST)
- INSEE/Postal code: 38283 /38350
- ^{1} French Land Register data, which excludes lakes, ponds, glaciers > 1 km^{2} (0.386 sq mi or 247 acres) and river estuaries.

Oris-en-Rattier is a commune in the Isère department in southeastern France.

== Population ==
Historical population
Year	Pop.	±% p.a.
1968	64	—
1975	48	−4.03%
1982	63	+3.96%
1990	74	+2.03%
1999	83	+1.28%
2007	93	+1.43%
2012	115	+4.34%
2017	114	−0.17%
2023	108	−0.90%
Source: INSEE

== See also ==
- Communes of the Isère department
