= Ponsonnas =

- Commune
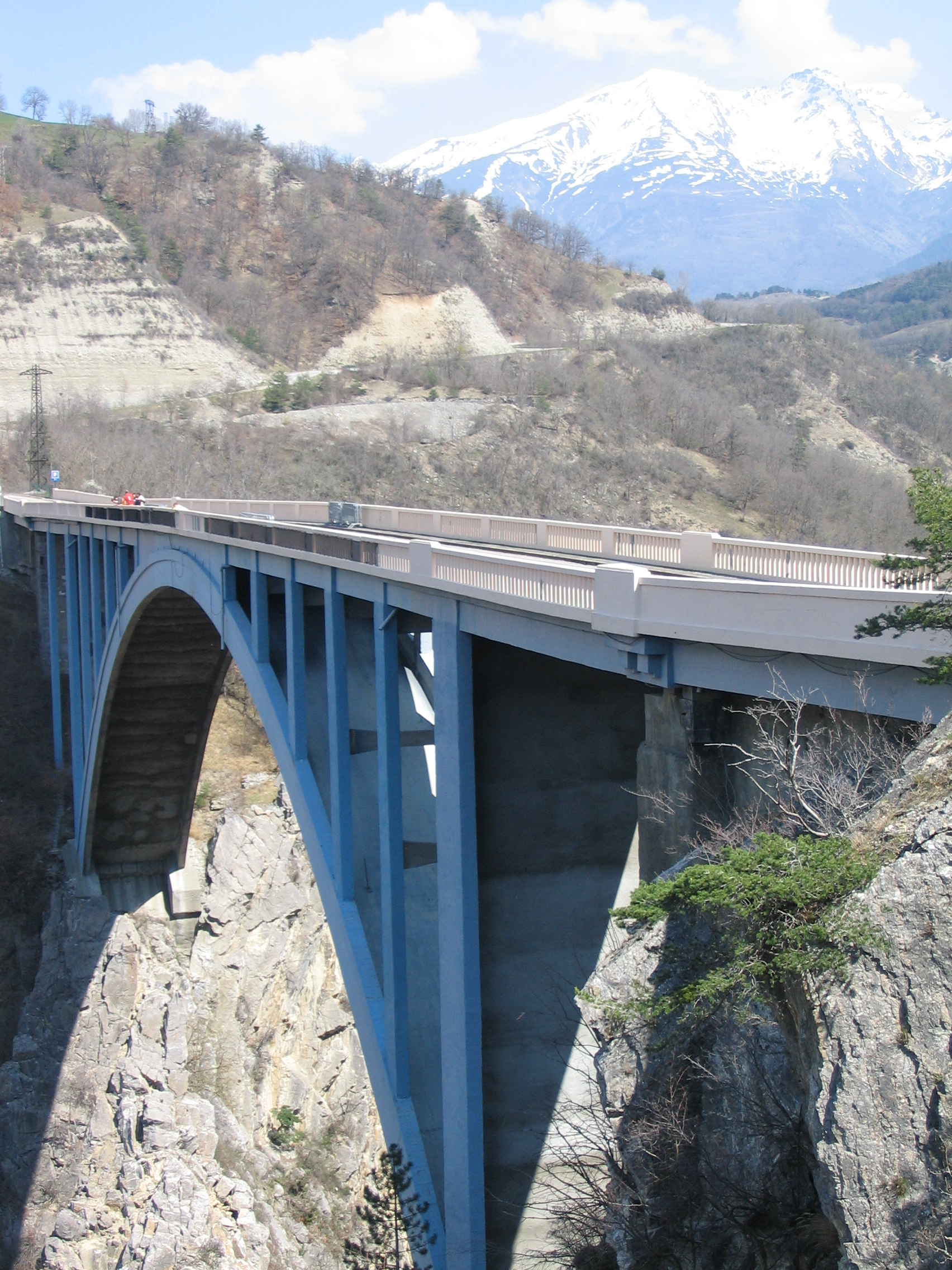
- The bridge over the Drac
- Location of Ponsonnas
- Location within France Location within Auvergne-Rhône-Alpes
- Coordinates: 44°53′24″N 5°47′51″E
- Country: France
- Region: Auvergne-Rhône-Alpes
- Department: Isère
- Arrondissement: Grenoble
- Canton: Matheysine-Trièves

Government
  - Mayor (2020–2026): Jean-Marc Laneyrie
- Area^{1}: 3 km^{2} (1.2 sq mi)
- Highest elevation: 870 m (2,850 ft)
- Lowest elevation: 496 m (1,627 ft)
- Population (2023): 288
  - Density: 96/km^{2} (250/sq mi)
- Time zone: UTC+01:00 (CET)
  - Summer (DST): UTC+02:00 (CEST)
- INSEE/Postal code: 38313 /38350
- ^{1} French Land Register data, which excludes lakes, ponds, glaciers > 1 km^{2} (0.386 sq mi or 247 acres) and river estuaries.

Ponsonnas (French pronunciation: [pɔ̃sɔna(s)]) is a commune in the Isère department in southeastern France. It is known for its bridge over the river Drac which is used for bungee jumping.

== Population ==
Historical population
Year	Pop.	±% p.a.
1968	115	—
1975	104	−1.43%
1982	155	+5.87%
1990	185	+2.24%
1999	226	+2.25%
2007	268	+2.15%
2012	269	+0.07%
2017	291	+1.58%
2023	288	−0.17%
Source: INSEE

== See also ==
- Communes of the Isère department
