= Canton of Matheysine-Trièves =

Coordinates: 44°56′06″N 5°45′57″E

Canton of Matheysine-Trièves is a canton of the Isère département, in south-eastern part of France. It was created at the French canton reorganisation which came into effect in March 2015. The seat of the canton is in La Mure. It takes its name from the regions Matheysine and Trièves.

== Composition ==
The canton of Matheysine-Trièves is composed of 70 communes:

1. Ambel
2. Avignonet
3. Beaufin
4. Chantepérier
5. Château-Bernard
6. Châtel-en-Trièves
7. Chichilianne
8. Cholonge
9. Clelles
10. Cognet
11. Cornillon-en-Trièves
12. Corps
13. Les Côtes-de-Corps
14. Entraigues
15. Gresse-en-Vercors
16. Laffrey
17. Lalley
18. Lavaldens
19. Lavars
20. Marcieu
21. Mayres-Savel
22. Mens
23. Miribel-Lanchâtre
24. Monestier-d'Ambel
25. Monestier-de-Clermont
26. Le Monestier-du-Percy
27. Monteynard
28. La Motte-d'Aveillans
29. La Motte-Saint-Martin
30. La Mure
31. Nantes-en-Ratier
32. Notre-Dame-de-Vaulx
33. Oris-en-Rattier
34. Pellafol
35. Percy
36. Pierre-Châtel
37. Ponsonnas
38. Prébois
39. Prunières
40. Quet-en-Beaumont
41. Roissard
42. Saint-Andéol
43. Saint-Arey
44. Saint-Baudille-et-Pipet
45. Sainte-Luce
46. Saint-Guillaume
47. Saint-Honoré
48. Saint-Jean-de-Vaulx
49. Saint-Jean-d'Hérans
50. Saint-Laurent-en-Beaumont
51. Saint-Martin-de-Clelles
52. Saint-Martin-de-la-Cluze
53. Saint-Maurice-en-Trièves
54. Saint-Michel-en-Beaumont
55. Saint-Michel-les-Portes
56. Saint-Paul-lès-Monestier
57. Saint-Pierre-de-Méaroz
58. Saint-Théoffrey
59. La Salette-Fallavaux
60. La Salle-en-Beaumont
61. Siévoz
62. Sinard
63. Sousville
64. Susville
65. Treffort
66. Tréminis
67. Valbonnais
68. La Valette
69. Valjouffrey
70. Villard-Saint-Christophe
