= Lavaldens =

- Commune
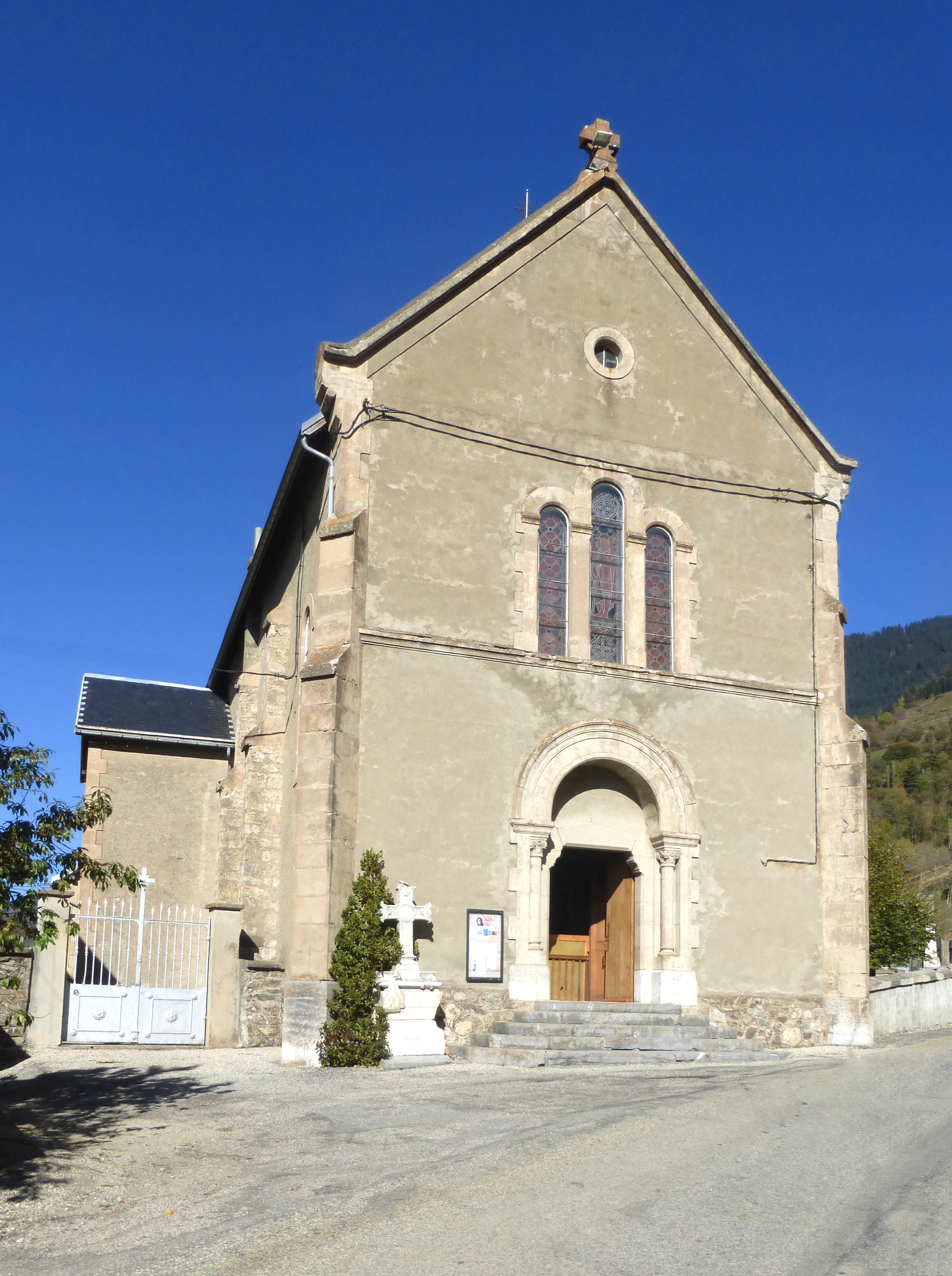
- The church of Saint-Christophe, in Lavaldens
- Location of Lavaldens
- Location within France Location within Auvergne-Rhône-Alpes
- Coordinates: 44°59′02″N 5°53′17″E
- Country: France
- Region: Auvergne-Rhône-Alpes
- Department: Isère
- Arrondissement: Grenoble
- Canton: Matheysine-Trièves

Government
  - Mayor (2020–2026): Arnaud Chattard
- Area^{1}: 41.4 km^{2} (16.0 sq mi)
- Highest elevation: 2,856 m (9,370 ft)
- Lowest elevation: 959 m (3,146 ft)
- Population (2023): 165
  - Density: 3.99/km^{2} (10.3/sq mi)
- Time zone: UTC+01:00 (CET)
  - Summer (DST): UTC+02:00 (CEST)
- INSEE/Postal code: 38207 /38350
- ^{1} French Land Register data, which excludes lakes, ponds, glaciers > 1 km^{2} (0.386 sq mi or 247 acres) and river estuaries.

Lavaldens (French pronunciation: [lavaldɛ̃s]) is a commune in the Isère department in southeastern France.

== Population ==
Historical population
Year	Pop.	±% p.a.
1968	224	—
1975	157	−4.95%
1982	146	−1.03%
1990	131	−1.35%
1999	139	+0.66%
2007	152	+1.12%
2012	169	+2.14%
2017	151	−2.23%
2023	165	+1.49%
Source: INSEE

== See also ==
- Communes of the Isère department
