= Saint-Baudille-et-Pipet =

- Commune
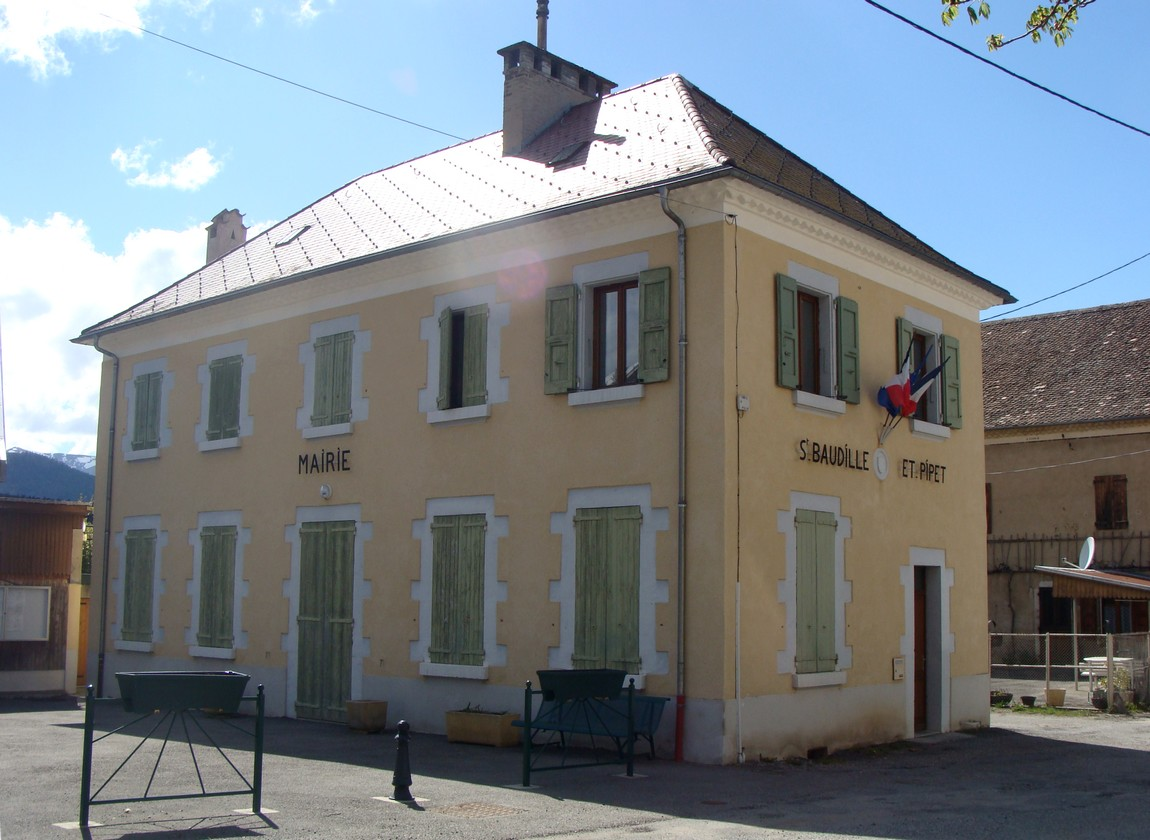
- The town hall of Saint-Baudille-et-Pipet
- Location of Saint-Baudille-et-Pipet
- Location within France Location within Auvergne-Rhône-Alpes
- Coordinates: 44°47′06″N 5°46′10″E
- Country: France
- Region: Auvergne-Rhône-Alpes
- Department: Isère
- Arrondissement: Grenoble
- Canton: Matheysine-Trièves

Government
  - Mayor (2020–2026): Jean-Louis Poite
- Area^{1}: 36 km^{2} (14 sq mi)
- Elevation: 830 m (2,720 ft)
- Highest elevation: 2,696 m (8,845 ft)
- Lowest elevation: 718 m (2,356 ft)
- Population (2023): 256
  - Density: 7.1/km^{2} (18/sq mi)
- Time zone: UTC+01:00 (CET)
  - Summer (DST): UTC+02:00 (CEST)
- INSEE/Postal code: 38366 /38710
- ^{1} French Land Register data, which excludes lakes, ponds, glaciers > 1 km^{2} (0.386 sq mi or 247 acres) and river estuaries.

Saint-Baudille-et-Pipet (French pronunciation: [sɛ̃ bodij e pipɛ]) is a commune in the Isère department in southeastern France.

== Population ==
Historical population
Year	Pop.	±% p.a.
1968	251	—
1975	209	−2.58%
1982	209	+0.00%
1990	215	+0.35%
1999	232	+0.85%
2007	250	+0.94%
2012	252	+0.16%
2017	257	+0.39%
2023	256	−0.06%
Source: INSEE

== See also ==
- Communes of the Isère department
