= Saint-Jean-d'Hérans =

- Commune
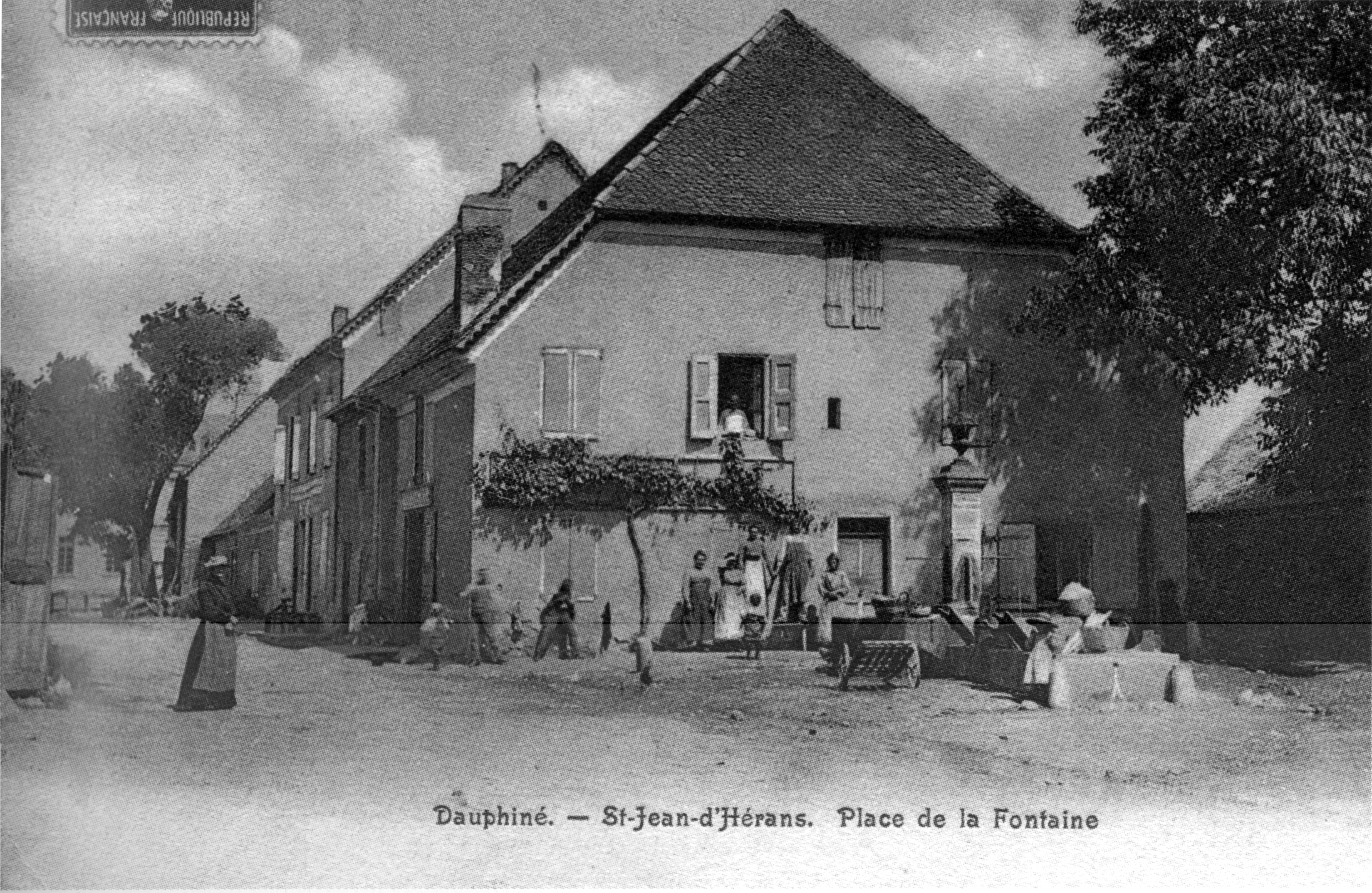
- Saint-Jean-d'Hérans in 1905
- Location of Saint-Jean-d'Hérans
- Location within France Location within Auvergne-Rhône-Alpes
- Coordinates: 44°51′14″N 5°45′41″E
- Country: France
- Region: Auvergne-Rhône-Alpes
- Department: Isère
- Arrondissement: Grenoble
- Canton: Matheysine-Trièves

Government
  - Mayor (2020–2026): Jean-Marie Garat
- Area^{1}: 17 km^{2} (6.6 sq mi)
- Elevation: 826 m (2,710 ft)
- Highest elevation: 1,101 m (3,612 ft)
- Lowest elevation: 486 m (1,594 ft)
- Population (2023): 318
  - Density: 19/km^{2} (48/sq mi)
- Time zone: UTC+01:00 (CET)
  - Summer (DST): UTC+02:00 (CEST)
- INSEE/Postal code: 38403 /38710
- ^{1} French Land Register data, which excludes lakes, ponds, glaciers > 1 km^{2} (0.386 sq mi or 247 acres) and river estuaries.

Saint-Jean-d'Hérans is a commune in the Isère department in southeastern France.

== Population ==
Historical population
Year	Pop.	±% p.a.
1968	227	—
1975	210	−1.11%
1982	218	+0.54%
1990	233	+0.84%
1999	242	+0.42%
2007	302	+2.81%
2012	301	−0.07%
2017	288	−0.88%
2023	318	+1.67%
Source: INSEE

== See also ==
- Communes of the Isère department
