= Monestier-du-Percy =

- Commune
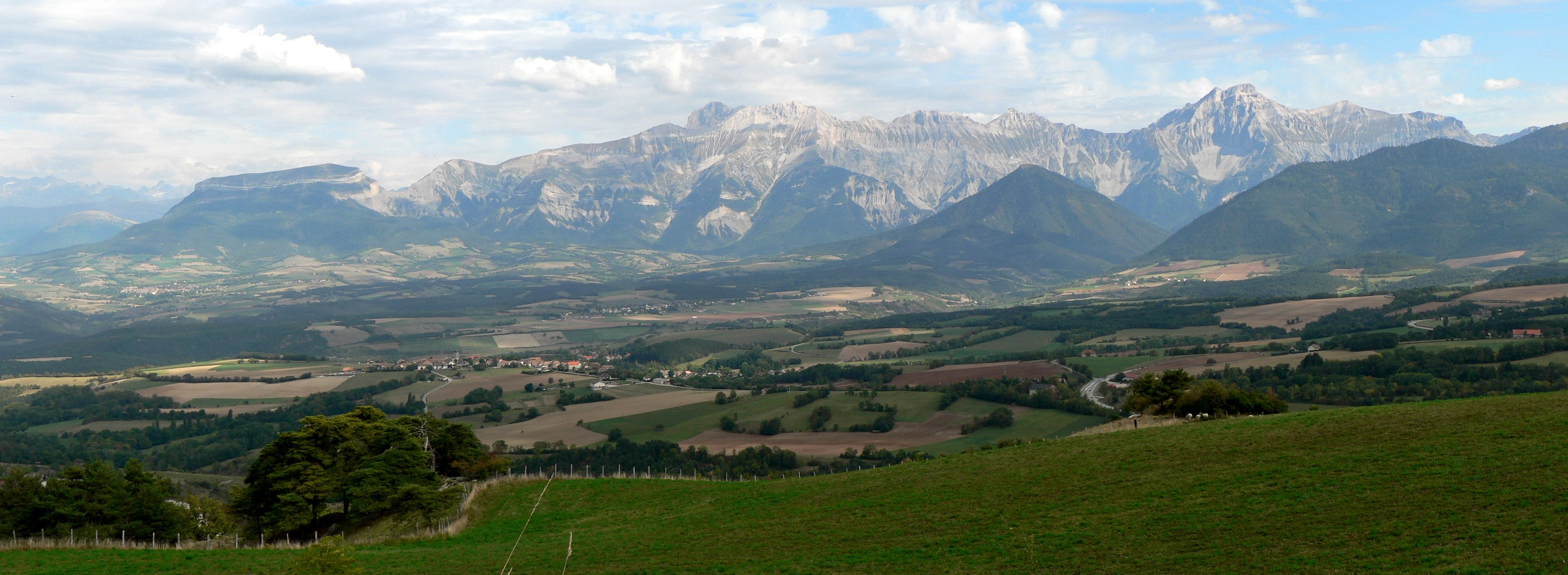
- A general view of Monestier-du-Percy
- Location of Monestier-du-Percy
- Location within France Location within Auvergne-Rhône-Alpes
- Coordinates: 44°47′42″N 5°39′34″E
- Country: France
- Region: Auvergne-Rhône-Alpes
- Department: Isère
- Arrondissement: Grenoble
- Canton: Matheysine-Trièves

Government
  - Mayor (2020–2026): Robert Cuchet
- Area^{1}: 15 km^{2} (5.8 sq mi)
- Elevation: 804 m (2,638 ft)
- Highest elevation: 1,896 m (6,220 ft)
- Lowest elevation: 597 m (1,959 ft)
- Population (2023): 254
  - Density: 17/km^{2} (44/sq mi)
- Time zone: UTC+01:00 (CET)
  - Summer (DST): UTC+02:00 (CEST)
- INSEE/Postal code: 38243 /38930
- ^{1} French Land Register data, which excludes lakes, ponds, glaciers > 1 km^{2} (0.386 sq mi or 247 acres) and river estuaries.

Monestier-du-Percy (French pronunciation: [mɔnɛstjˈe dy pɛʁsˈi], known as Le Monestier-du-Percy until 31 December 2022) is a commune in the Isère department in southeastern France.

== Population ==
Historical population
Year	Pop.	±% p.a.
1968	181	—
1975	153	−2.37%
1982	146	−0.67%
1990	166	+1.62%
1999	166	+0.00%
2007	216	+3.35%
2012	245	+2.55%
2017	251	+0.49%
2023	254	+0.20%
Source: INSEE

== See also ==
- Communes of the Isère department
- Parc naturel régional du Vercors
