= Saint-Paul-lès-Monestier =

- Commune
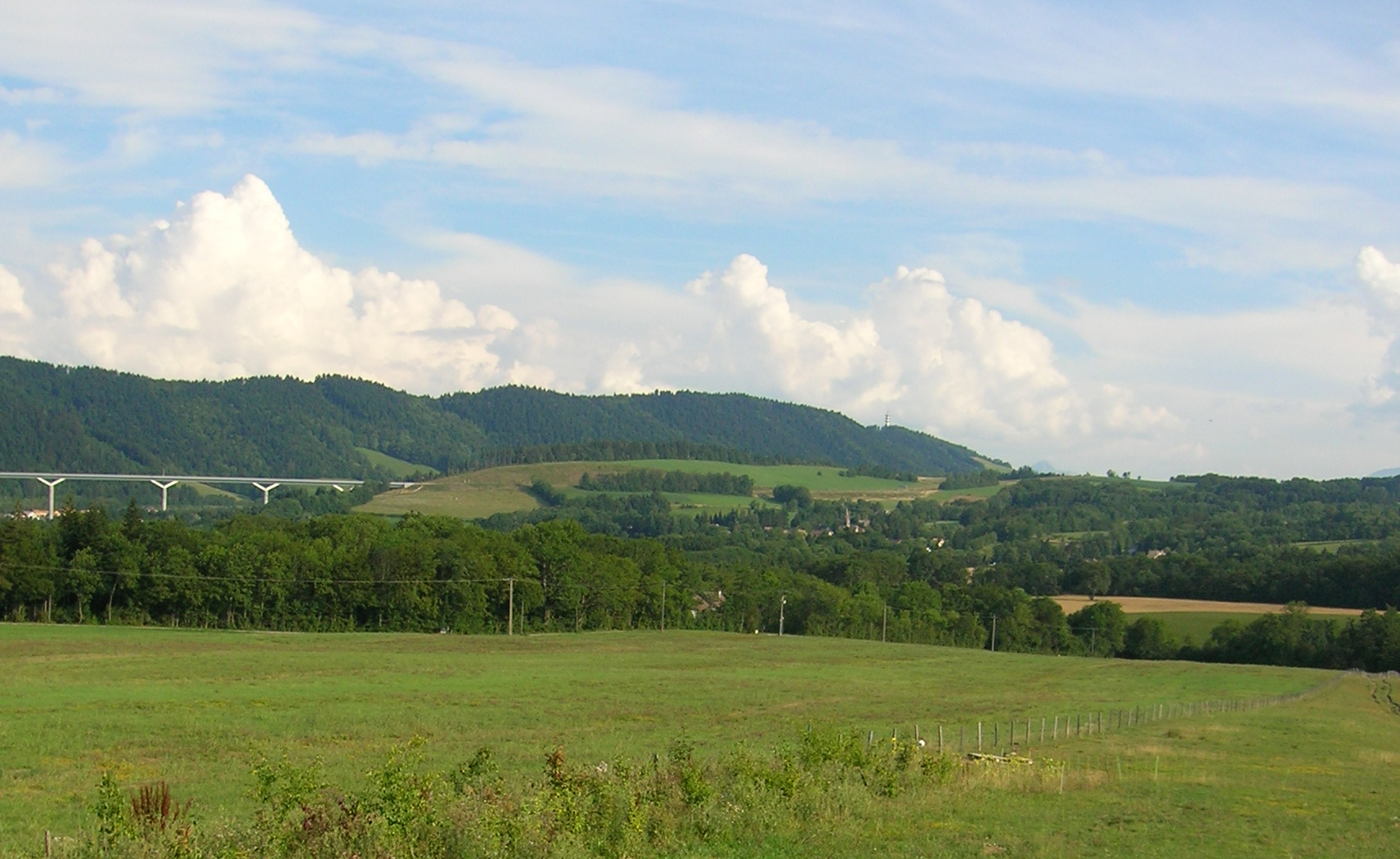
- A general view of Saint-Paul-lès-Monestier
- Location of Saint-Paul-lès-Monestier
- Location within France Location within Auvergne-Rhône-Alpes
- Coordinates: 44°55′49″N 5°37′42″E
- Country: France
- Region: Auvergne-Rhône-Alpes
- Department: Isère
- Arrondissement: Grenoble
- Canton: Matheysine-Trièves
- Intercommunality: Trièves

Government
  - Mayor (2020–2026): Béatrice Vial
- Area^{1}: 14 km^{2} (5.4 sq mi)
- Elevation: 816 m (2,677 ft)
- Highest elevation: 1,800 m (5,900 ft)
- Lowest elevation: 515 m (1,690 ft)
- Population (2023): 288
  - Density: 21/km^{2} (53/sq mi)
- Time zone: UTC+01:00 (CET)
  - Summer (DST): UTC+02:00 (CEST)
- INSEE/Postal code: 38438 /38650
- ^{1} French Land Register data, which excludes lakes, ponds, glaciers > 1 km^{2} (0.386 sq mi or 247 acres) and river estuaries.

Saint-Paul-lès-Monestier (French pronunciation: [sɛ̃ pɔl lɛ mɔnɛstje], literally Saint-Paul near Monestier) is a commune in the Isère department in southeastern France.

== Population ==
Historical population
Year	Pop.	±% p.a.
1968	131	—
1975	132	+0.11%
1982	160	+2.79%
1990	190	+2.17%
1999	220	+1.64%
2007	277	+2.92%
2012	247	−2.27%
2017	267	+1.57%
2023	288	+1.27%
Source: INSEE

== See also ==
- Communes of the Isère department
- Parc naturel régional du Vercors
