= Prébois =

- Commune
- Location of Prébois
- Location within France Location within Auvergne-Rhône-Alpes
- Coordinates: 44°47′24″N 5°41′45″E
- Country: France
- Region: Auvergne-Rhône-Alpes
- Department: Isère
- Arrondissement: Grenoble
- Canton: Matheysine-Trièves

Government
  - Mayor (2020–2026): Yannick Faure
- Area^{1}: 16 km^{2} (6.2 sq mi)
- Highest elevation: 1,720 m (5,640 ft)
- Lowest elevation: 596 m (1,955 ft)
- Population (2023): 170
  - Density: 11/km^{2} (28/sq mi)
- Time zone: UTC+01:00 (CET)
  - Summer (DST): UTC+02:00 (CEST)
- INSEE/Postal code: 38321 /38710
- ^{1} French Land Register data, which excludes lakes, ponds, glaciers > 1 km^{2} (0.386 sq mi or 247 acres) and river estuaries.

Prébois (French pronunciation: [pʁebwa]; Occitan: Pratbois) is a commune in the Isère department in southeastern France.

== Population ==
Historical population
Year	Pop.	±% p.a.
1968	141	—
1975	135	−0.62%
1982	142	+0.72%
1990	137	−0.45%
1999	139	+0.16%
2007	156	+1.45%
2012	165	+1.13%
2017	164	−0.12%
2023	170	+0.60%
Source: INSEE

== See also ==
- Communes of the Isère department
