= Sainte-Luce, Isère =

Sainte-Luce
- Commune
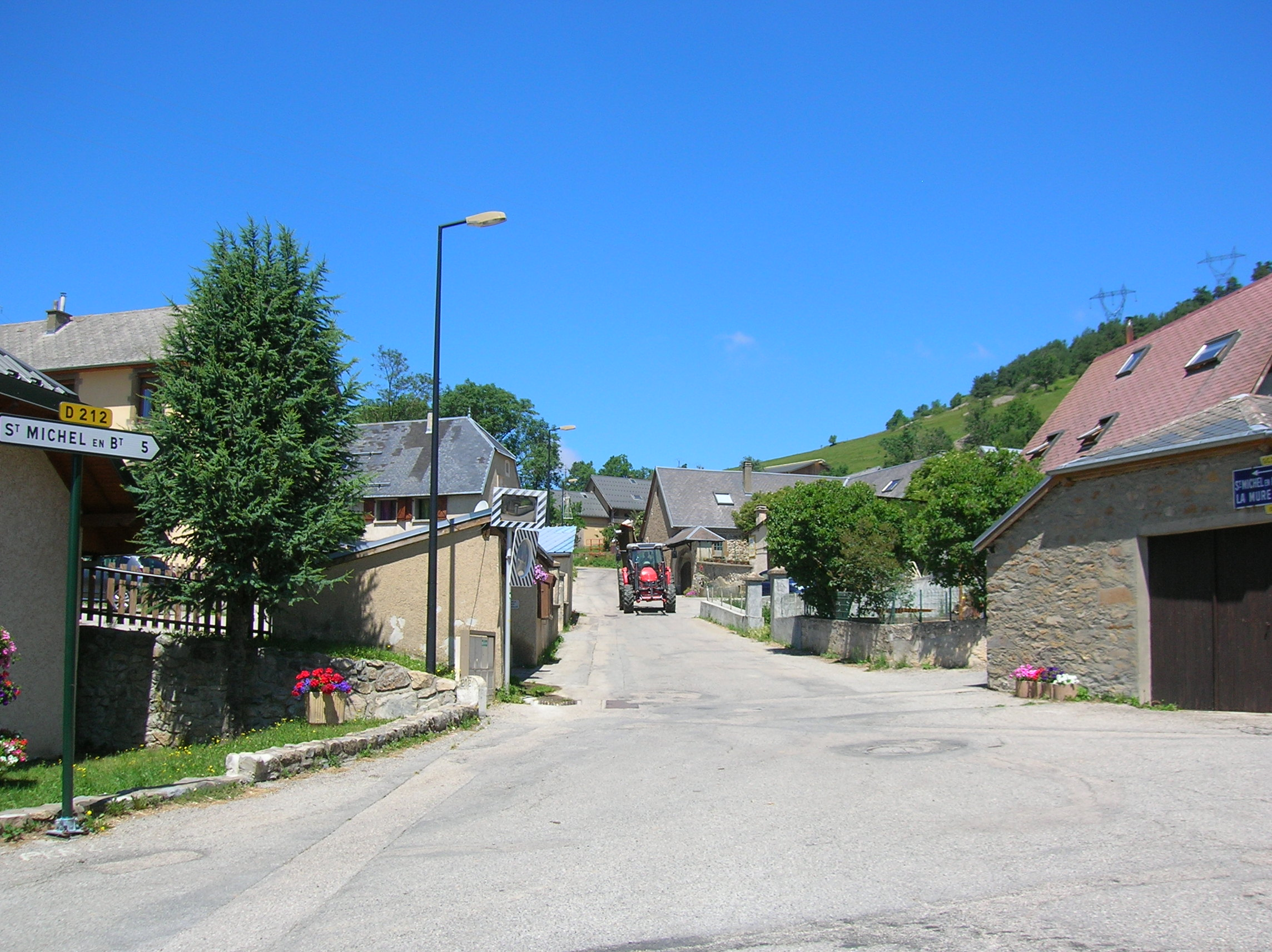
- A view within the village of Sainte-Luce
- Location of Sainte-Luce
- Location within France Location within Auvergne-Rhône-Alpes
- Coordinates: 44°51′05″N 5°54′44″E
- Country: France
- Region: Auvergne-Rhône-Alpes
- Department: Isère
- Arrondissement: Grenoble
- Canton: Matheysine-Trièves
- Intercommunality: Matheysine

Government
  - Mayor (2020–2026): Florence Grand
- Area^{1}: 8 km^{2} (3.1 sq mi)
- Highest elevation: 1,877 m (6,158 ft)
- Lowest elevation: 667 m (2,188 ft)
- Population (2023): 42
  - Density: 5.3/km^{2} (14/sq mi)
- Time zone: UTC+01:00 (CET)
  - Summer (DST): UTC+02:00 (CEST)
- INSEE/Postal code: 38414 /38970
- ^{1} French Land Register data, which excludes lakes, ponds, glaciers > 1 km^{2} (0.386 sq mi or 247 acres) and river estuaries.

Sainte-Luce (French pronunciation: [sɛ̃t lys]) is a commune in the Isère department in southeastern France.

== Population ==
Historical population
Year	Pop.	±% p.a.
1968	51	—
1975	38	−4.12%
1982	25	−5.81%
1990	33	+3.53%
1999	22	−4.41%
2007	34	+5.59%
2012	41	+3.82%
2017	43	+0.96%
2023	42	−0.39%
Source: INSEE

== See also ==
- Communes of the Isère department
