= Cornillon-en-Trièves =

- Commune
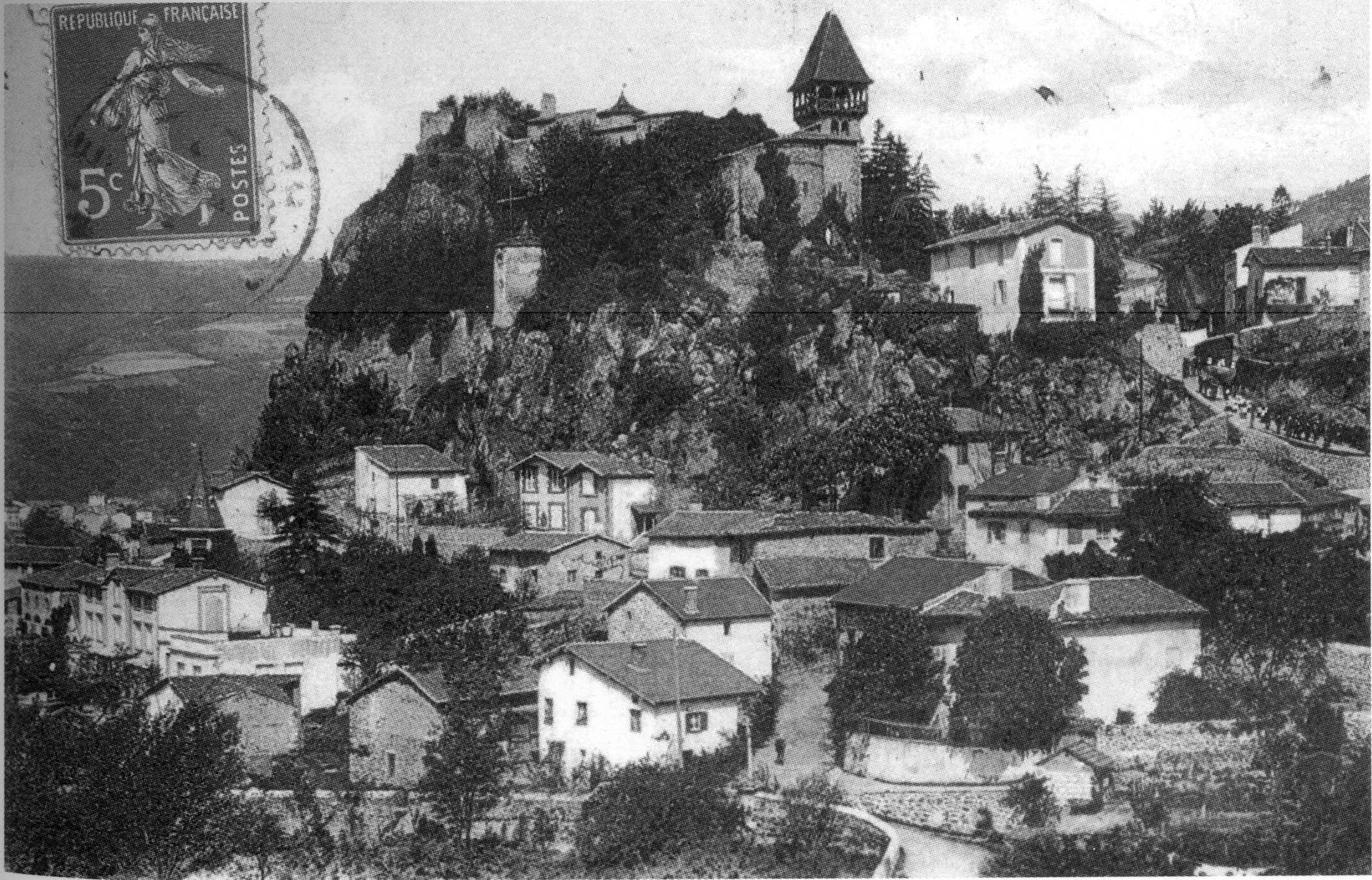
- Cornillon-en-Trièves in 1911
- Location of Cornillon-en-Trièves
- Location within France Location within Auvergne-Rhône-Alpes
- Coordinates: 44°49′50″N 5°43′06″E
- Country: France
- Region: Auvergne-Rhône-Alpes
- Department: Isère
- Arrondissement: Grenoble
- Canton: Matheysine-Trièves

Government
  - Mayor (2020–2026): Gérard Baup
- Area^{1}: 14 km^{2} (5.4 sq mi)
- Elevation: 800 m (2,600 ft)
- Highest elevation: 1,106 m (3,629 ft)
- Lowest elevation: 493 m (1,617 ft)
- Population (2023): 173
  - Density: 12/km^{2} (32/sq mi)
- Time zone: UTC+01:00 (CET)
  - Summer (DST): UTC+02:00 (CEST)
- INSEE/Postal code: 38127 /38710
- ^{1} French Land Register data, which excludes lakes, ponds, glaciers > 1 km^{2} (0.386 sq mi or 247 acres) and river estuaries.

Cornillon-en-Trièves (French pronunciation: [kɔʁnijɔ̃ ɑ̃ tʁijɛv]; Occitan: Cornilhon) is a commune in the Isère department in southeastern France.

== Population ==
Historical population
| Year | Pop. | ±% p.a. |
|---|---|---|
| 1968 | 128 | — |
| 1975 | 132 | +0.44% |
| 1982 | 142 | +1.05% |
| 1990 | 142 | +0.00% |
| 1999 | 137 | −0.40% |
| 2007 | 166 | +2.43% |
| 2012 | 170 | +0.48% |
| 2017 | 165 | −0.60% |
| 2023 | 173 | +0.79% |
Source: INSEE

== See also ==
- Communes of the Isère department
