= Oisans =

Valley in the French Alps

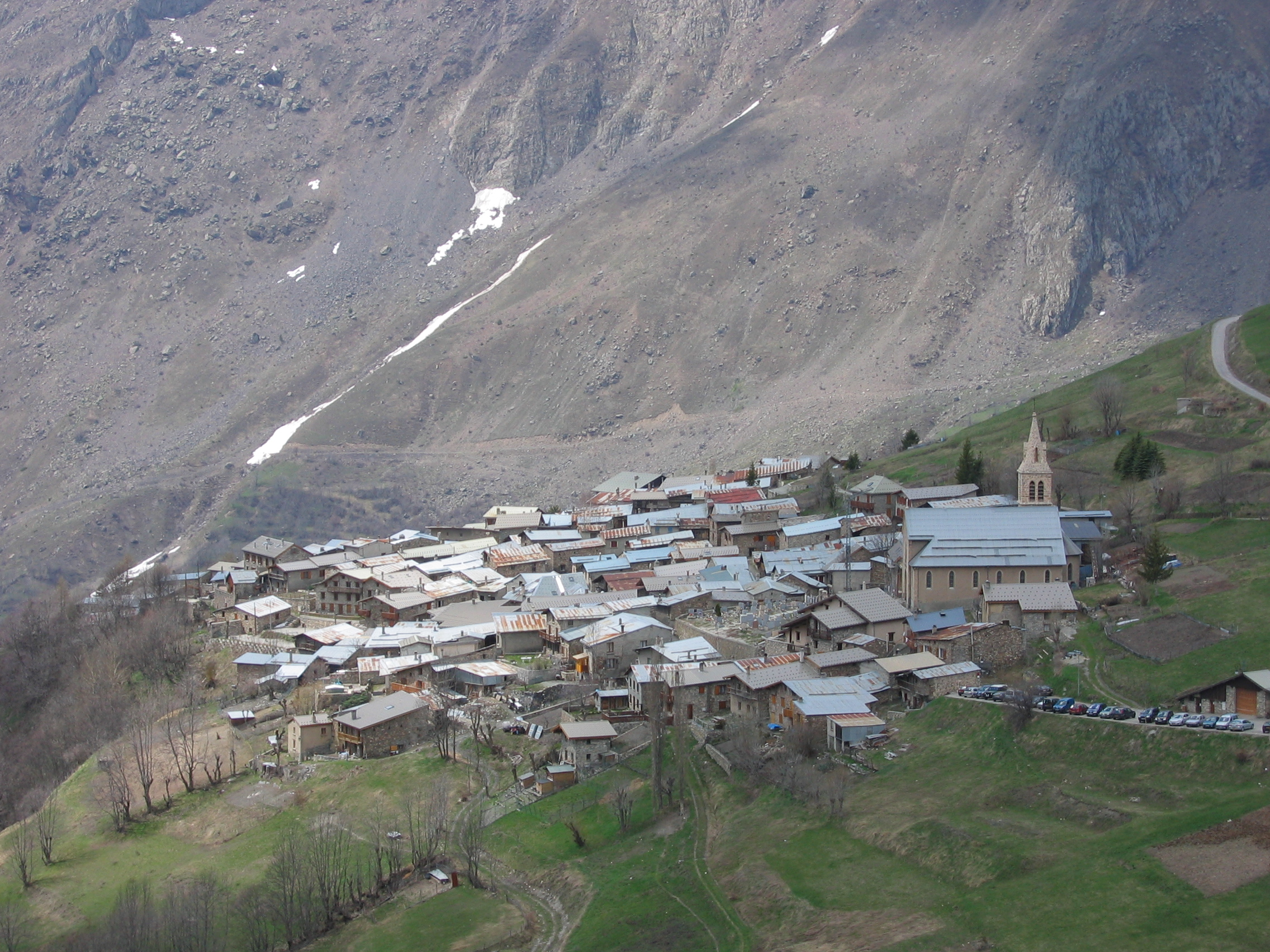
- A village in the Oisans, Besse-en-Oisans

- Location within France
- Length: 70 km (43 mi) west

Geology
- Type: Glacial valley

Geography
- Location: Auvergne-Rhône-Alpes; Provence-Alpes-Côte d'Azur, France
- Coordinates: 45°03′N 6°02′E
- Mountain range: Alps
- Traversed by: River Romanche
- Interactive map of Oisans

The Oisans (French pronunciation: [wazɑ̃]) is a region in the French Alps, located in the departments of Isère and Hautes-Alpes, and corresponding to the drainage basin of the river Romanche and its tributaries (Eau d'Olle, Lignarre, Sarenne, Vénéon and Ferrand). Between Livet-et-Gavet and Le Bourg-d'Oisans, the Romanche forms a deep gorge.

== Description ==
Its geographical definition coincides almost exactly with the former cantons of Le Bourg-d'Oisans (Isère) and La Grave (Hautes Alpes).

The Oisans covers parts of the massifs of Belledonne, Taillefer, Grandes Rousses, Arves and Écrins.

The highest point in the region is the mountain of Pic Lory, a subpeak of the Barre des Écrins which reaches a height of 4,088 metres, but the most symbolic peak is la Meije which is nicknamed the "Queen of the Oisans".

The Oisans is a remarkable territory, thanks to its numerous mountain chains, valleys, rivers, streams and plains.

The Oisans is a very touristic region, both for winter and summer sports. Oisans regularly hosts the Tour de France as well as many major sporting events on a European scale (Super-Biker, World of Snowboarding, Skiing World, the Bike Festival, Andros Trophy or the Criterium Cyclist of Dauphiné Libéré).

The provincial road 1091 (formerly RN 91) is the main access road into this area, beginning in the town of Livet-et-Gavet. In recent years, the RD1091 has been significantly upgraded, with various ring roads that provide faster access and more enjoyable access to the Oisans.

The town of Bourg d'Oisans is the equivalent of the capital of this territory because this town is at the centre of six valleys.

The main towns are Bourg d'Oisans, Les Deux Alpes, Livet-et-Gavet and Huez.

== Winter sport resorts ==
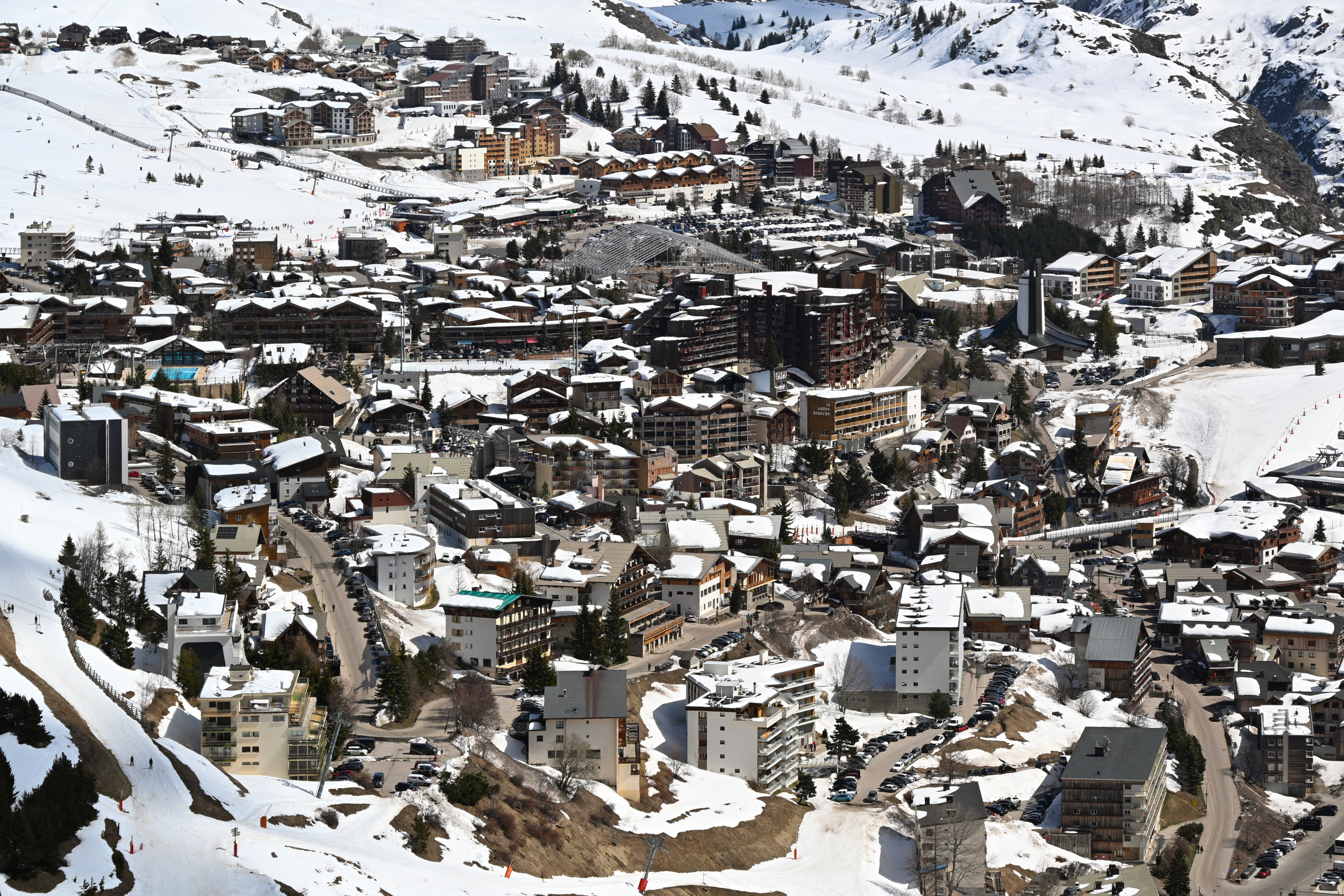
Alpe d'Huez

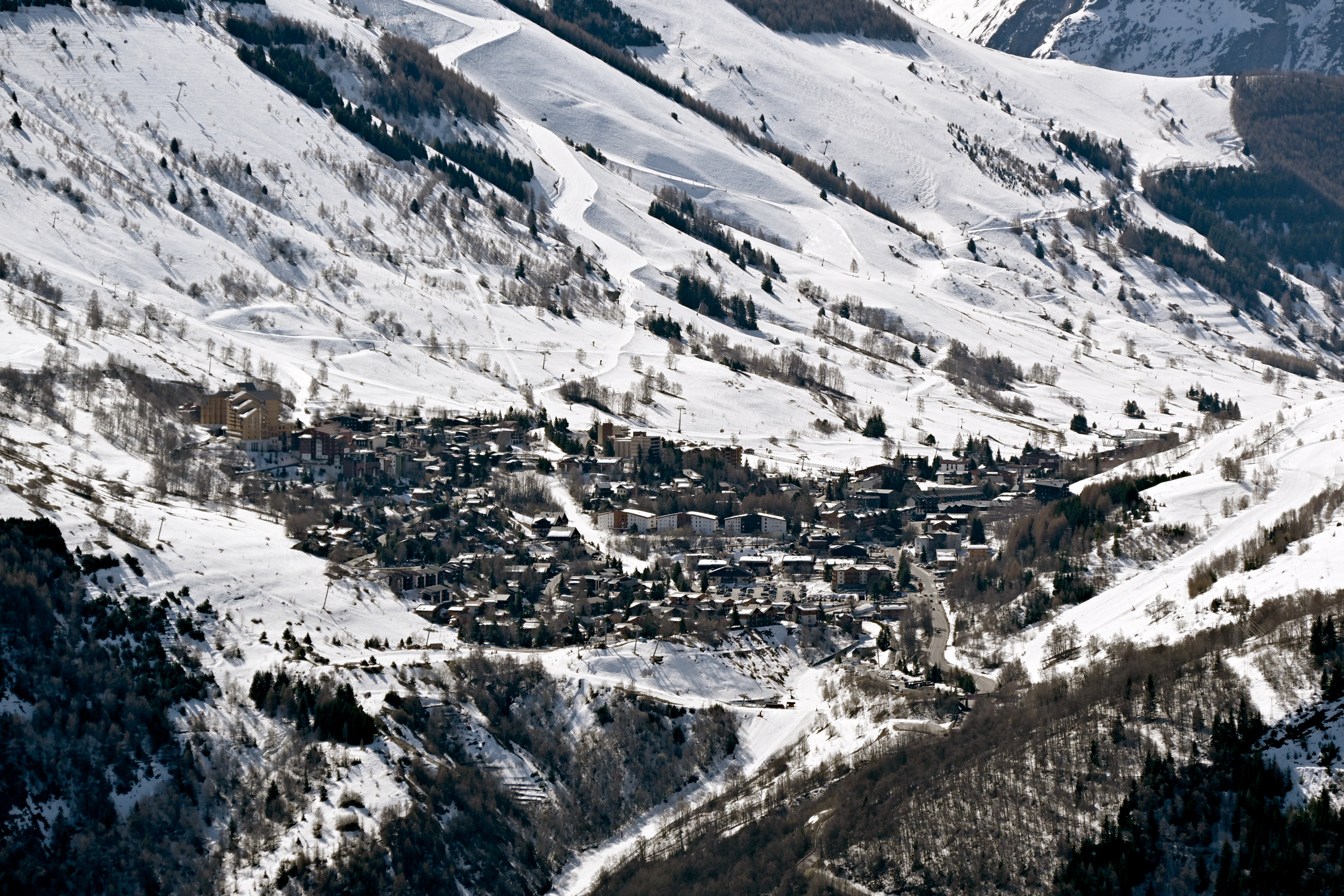
Les Deux Alpes

- L'Alpe d'Huez
- Les Deux Alpes
- Auris-en-Oisans
- la Grave - la Meije
- Villard-Reculas
- Oz-en-Oisans
- Le Col d'Ornon
- Mont-de-Lans
- Vaujany
- La Garde-en-Oisans
- Venosc

== Villages in the Oisans ==
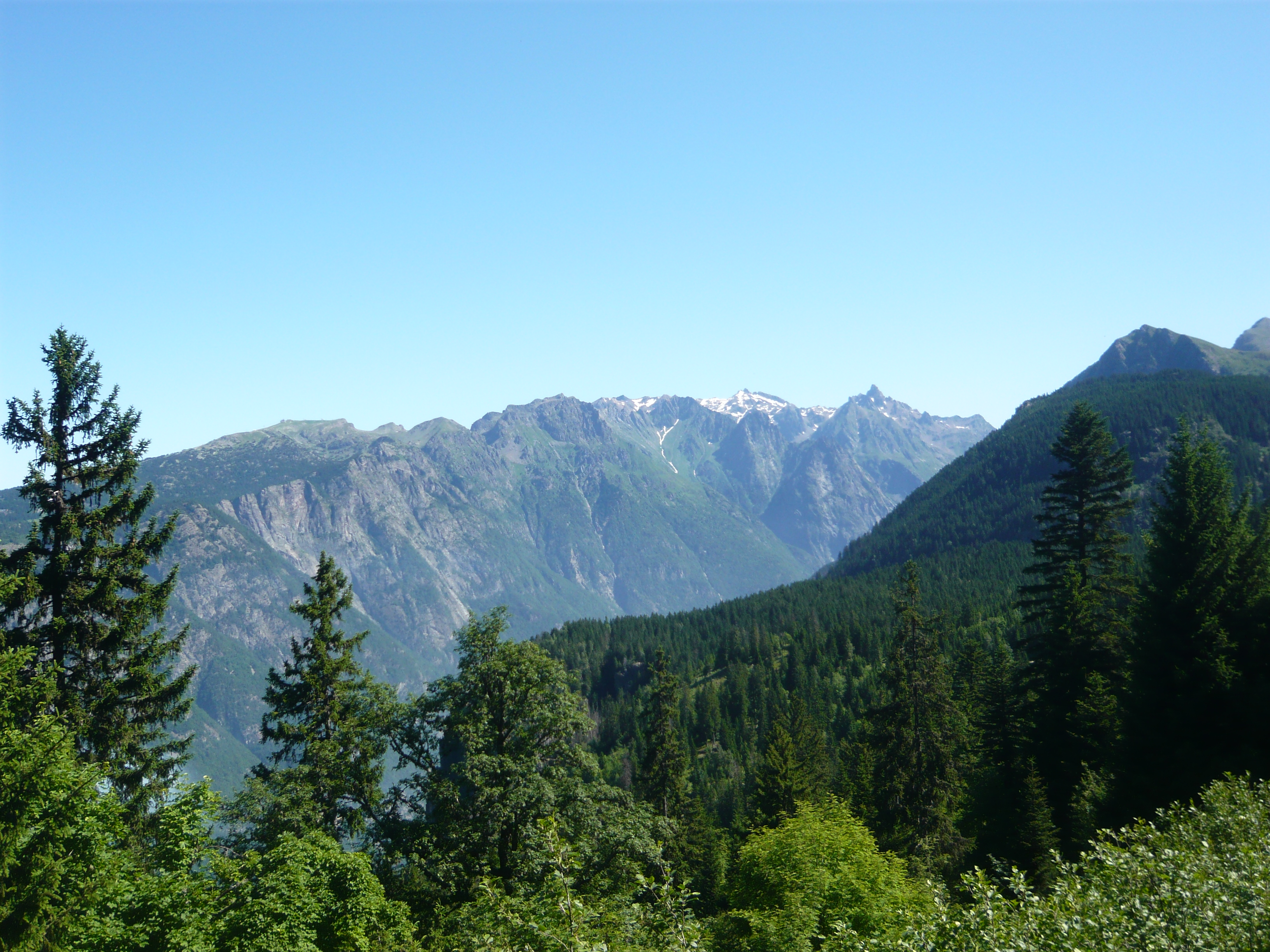
The Oisans mountains seen from La Morte (Isère)

- Le Bourg-d'Oisans
- Livet-et-Gavet
- Allemond
- Le Freney-d'Oisans
- Mizoen
- Clavans-en-Haut-Oisans
- Oulles
- Ornon
- Saint-Christophe-en-Oisans
- Besse-en-Oisans
- Villard-Notre-Dame
- Villard-Reymond
- Villar-d'Arêne
- Huez
- Venosc
- La Grave
- Vaujany
- La Garde

== See also ==
- Parc national des Écrins
- Massif des Écrins
