= Chamrousse =

- Commune
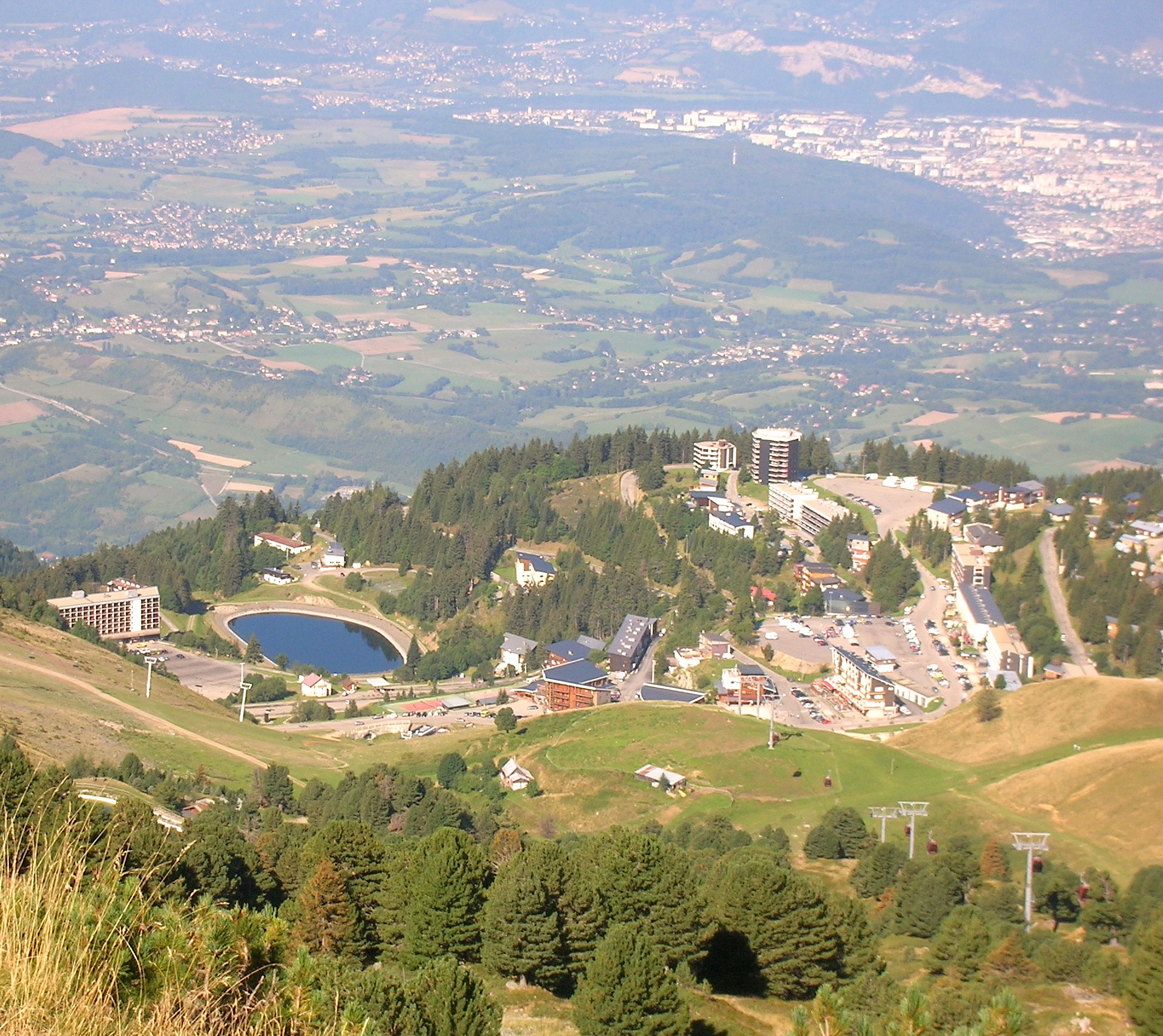
- A general view of Chamrousse
- Location of Chamrousse
- Location within France Location within Auvergne-Rhône-Alpes
- Coordinates: 45°06′33″N 5°52′28″E
- Country: France
- Region: Auvergne-Rhône-Alpes
- Department: Isère
- Arrondissement: Grenoble
- Canton: Oisans-Romanche
- Intercommunality: CC Le Grésivaudan

Government
  - Mayor (2020–2026): Brigitte de Bernis
- Area^{1}: 13 km^{2} (5.0 sq mi)
- Highest elevation: 2,440 m (8,010 ft)
- Lowest elevation: 1,384 m (4,541 ft)
- Population (2023): 453
  - Density: 35/km^{2} (90/sq mi)
- Time zone: UTC+01:00 (CET)
  - Summer (DST): UTC+02:00 (CEST)
- INSEE/Postal code: 38567 /38410
- ^{1} French Land Register data, which excludes lakes, ponds, glaciers > 1 km^{2} (0.386 sq mi or 247 acres) and river estuaries.

Chamrousse
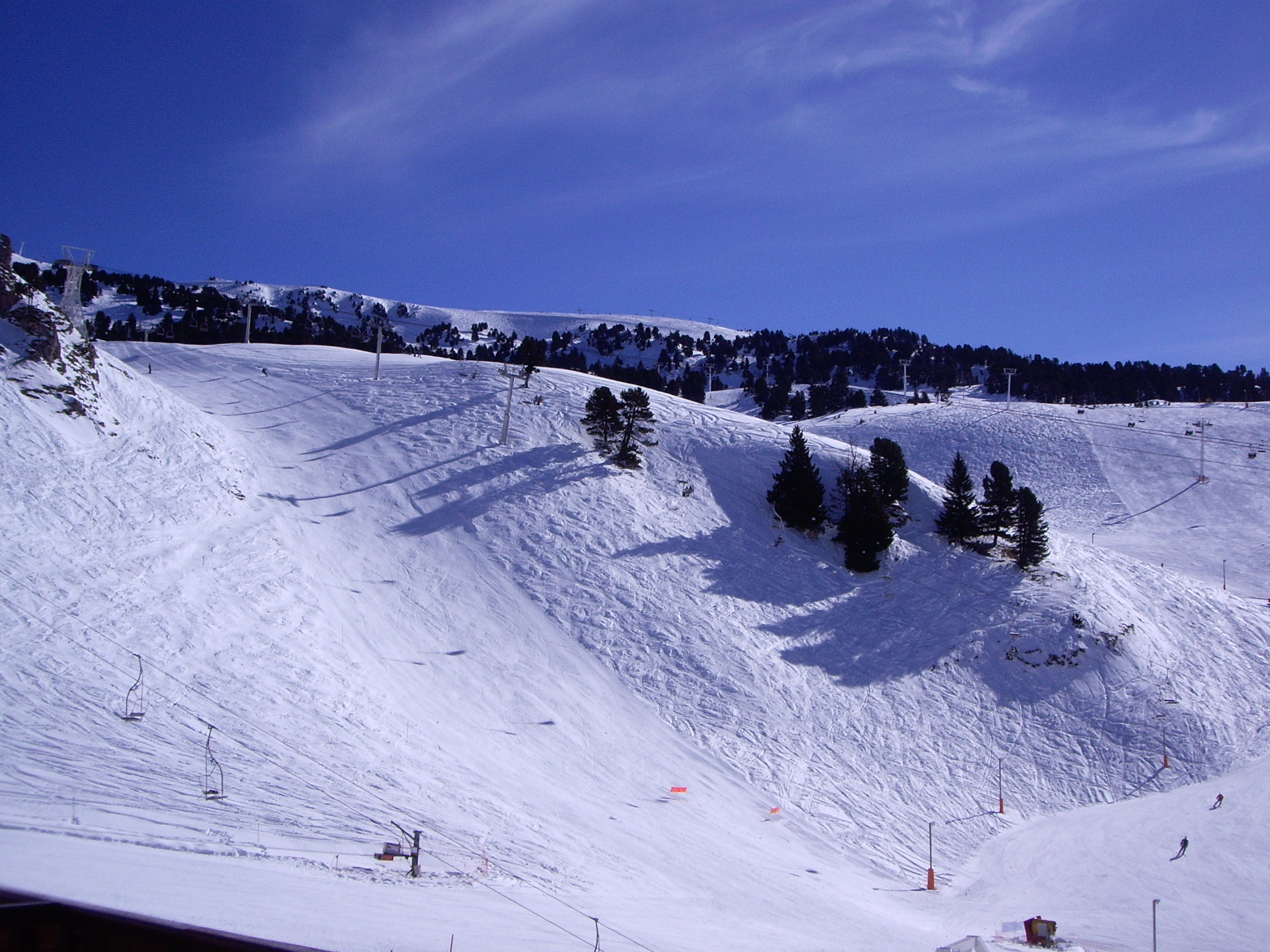
- Part of the ski area, viewed from Recoin

- Location within Alps
- Coordinates: 45°06′33″N 5°52′28″E
- Vertical: 850 m (2,790 ft)
- Top elevation: 2,250 m (7,380 ft)
- Base elevation: 1,400 m (4,590 ft)
- Skiable area: 90 km (56 mi) of runs
- Trails: 40 Total; 8 (20%) beginner; 14 (35%) easy; 13 (32%) intermediate; 5 (13%) difficult
- Lift system: 16 total; 1 gondola; 6 chair lifts; 9 surface lifts
- Snowmaking: 40 ha (100 acres)
- Website: winter.chamrousse.com

Chamrousse (French pronunciation: [ʃɑ̃ʁus]) is a commune and a ski resort in the Isère department in Southeastern France. It is located in the Belledonne mountain range southeast of Grenoble. The commune was created in 1989 from parts of the communes Saint-Martin-d'Uriage, Vaulnaveys-le-Haut and Séchilienne. The ski resort is situated on the Recoin (Chamrousse 1650) at 1,650 m (5,413 ft) and the Roche Béranger at 1,750 m (5,741 ft). The ski-lifts reach the Croix de Chamrousse at 2,253 m (7,392 ft), served by the Télécabine de la Croix gondola, and Roche Béranger (Chamrousse 1750). There are more than 90 km (56 mi) of downhill runs at Chamrousse and 24 ski lifts. There are 37 km (23 mi) of trails for cross-country skiing. Cross-country skiing can be practised from the opening of the resort to early or mid-April.

== Population ==
Population data refer to the area corresponding with the commune as of January 2025.

Historical population
Year	Pop.	±% p.a.
1968	718	—
1975	533	−4.17%
1982	607	+1.87%
1990	544	−1.36%
1999	518	−0.54%
2007	473	−1.13%
2012	467	−0.25%
2017	422	−2.01%
2023	453	+1.19%
Source: INSEE

== 1968 Winter Olympics ==
Chamrousse hosted the six alpine skiing events of the 1968 Winter Olympics, where Jean-Claude Killy of France won three gold medals in the men's events. The men's downhill event took place on the lower sector of Casserousse (1,400 m). All women's events took place at Recoin de Chamrousse, located 2 km (1.2 mi) away.

== Cycle racing ==
=== Details of the climb ===
The road to the ski station starts at Uriage-les-Bains from where the climb is 19 km (12 mi) long, gaining 1,235 m (4,052 ft) in elevation, at an average gradient of 6.5%. There are several sections in excess off 11% in the early stages of the climb. For the Tour de France, the summit is at an elevation of 1,730 m (5,680 ft).

The ski station can also be reached by a more northerly route, from Uriage-les-Bains via Saint-Martin-d'Uriage. This climb is 18.2 km (11.3 mi) gaining 1,315 m (4,314 ft) in elevation, at an average gradient of 7.2%.

=== Tour de France ===
The climb of Chamrousse was used in the mountain time-trial in the 2001 Tour de France. Lance Armstrong won the stage (#11) on 18 July 2001, when he took just over an hour to complete the hors catégorie climb from Grenoble to the ski resort. In 2012, Armstrong was disqualified from winning this stage, following the Lance Armstrong doping case.

The ski station was re-visited by the race on 18 July 2014. The winner of the 197 km (122 mi) stage 13 from Saint-Étienne was the Italian Vincenzo Nibali who increased his lead over his nearest rivals, with Richie Porte, who began the day second overall, losing nine minutes on the climb.

== Climate ==
On average, Chamrousse experiences 135.8 days per year with a minimum temperature below 0 °C (32.0 °F), 15.3 days per year with a minimum temperature below −10 °C (14.0 °F), 44.8 days per year with a maximum temperature below 0 °C (32.0 °F), and no days per year with a maximum temperature above 30 °C (86.0 °F). The record high temperature was 28.6 °C (83.5 °F) on 18 July 2023, while the record low temperature was −23.3 °C (−9.9 °F) on 5 February 2012.

Climate data for Chamrousse, 1730m (1991–2020 normals, extremes 2002–present)
Month	Jan	Feb	Mar	Apr	May	Jun	Jul	Aug	Sep	Oct	Nov	Dec	Year
Record high °C (°F)	16.8 (62.2)	16.7 (62.1)	16.4 (61.5)	18.5 (65.3)	24.6 (76.3)	27.7 (81.9)	28.6 (83.5)	27.9 (82.2)	23.3 (73.9)	21.8 (71.2)	19.2 (66.6)	15.2 (59.4)	28.6 (83.5)
Mean daily maximum °C (°F)	2.0 (35.6)	1.9 (35.4)	4.0 (39.2)	7.8 (46.0)	10.9 (51.6)	15.5 (59.9)	18.0 (64.4)	17.4 (63.3)	13.5 (56.3)	10.7 (51.3)	6.1 (43.0)	3.4 (38.1)	9.3 (48.7)
Daily mean °C (°F)	−1.3 (29.7)	−1.7 (28.9)	0.6 (33.1)	4.3 (39.7)	7.4 (45.3)	11.9 (53.4)	14.0 (57.2)	13.8 (56.8)	10.2 (50.4)	7.4 (45.3)	3.0 (37.4)	0.1 (32.2)	5.8 (42.4)
Mean daily minimum °C (°F)	−4.6 (23.7)	−5.3 (22.5)	−2.9 (26.8)	0.9 (33.6)	3.9 (39.0)	8.2 (46.8)	10.1 (50.2)	10.1 (50.2)	6.9 (44.4)	4.1 (39.4)	−0.2 (31.6)	−3.3 (26.1)	2.3 (36.2)
Record low °C (°F)	−18.5 (−1.3)	−23.3 (−9.9)	−17.9 (−0.2)	−12.0 (10.4)	−7.7 (18.1)	−3.4 (25.9)	0.8 (33.4)	0.6 (33.1)	−3.9 (25.0)	−9.4 (15.1)	−15.7 (3.7)	−17.7 (0.1)	−23.3 (−9.9)
Average precipitation mm (inches)	89.4 (3.52)	74.6 (2.94)	95.7 (3.77)	93.7 (3.69)	144.7 (5.70)	99.5 (3.92)	97.5 (3.84)	119.3 (4.70)	87.7 (3.45)	104.6 (4.12)	106.4 (4.19)	106.2 (4.18)	1,219.3 (48.02)
Average precipitation days (≥ 1.0 mm)	10.6	9.0	11.5	10.3	13.2	10.9	8.9	9.1	8.0	9.7	10.2	11.4	122.8
Source: Meteociel
