= Uriage-les-Bains =

Mineral spa health resort town in southeastern France

Coordinates: 45.1374°N 5.8255°E

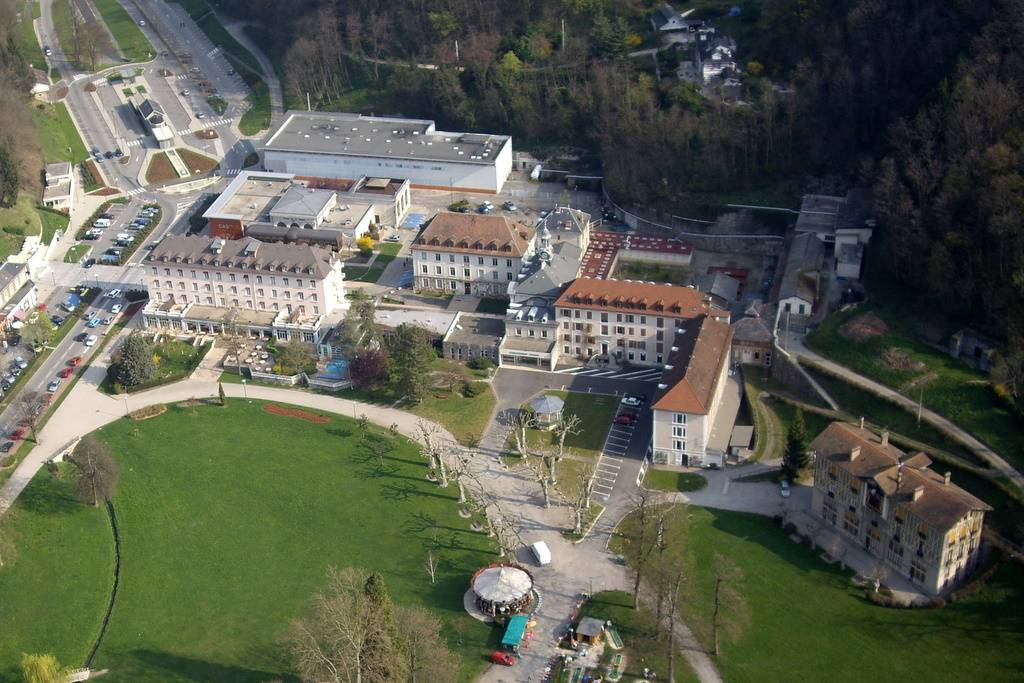
An aerial view of the spa complex and Uriage casino

Uriage-les-Bains (or Uriage) is a spa town in France, at 414 m (1,358 ft) above sea level. Uriage is attached to the communes of Saint-Martin-d'Uriage and Vaulnaveys-le-Haut and is located in the department of Isère, beneath the ski resort of Chamrousse. The inhabitants are called the Uriageois (es). Uriage does not have the status of a municipality.

Uriage is served by the departmental road 524, which is the old N524 from Grenoble to Vizille, through Gières.

== Origin ==
The town was established during the Roman Empire. The Romans built baths to enjoy the anti-rheumatic properties of the springwater. They ventured up to the Croix de Chamrousse, at the foot of which, in 1856, eight Roman bronze medals were found.

== Uriage thermal water ==
Uriage thermal water contains sulphide and salt, and has a molecular concentration similar to that of human blood serum, which is unique in the world and allowed to be administered directly in intra-muscular injections.

There are various curing techniques including showers, baths, hydromassages, applications of mud, filiform shower and aerosols.

== See also ==
List of spa towns in France
