= Alpe du Grand Serre =

French ski resort

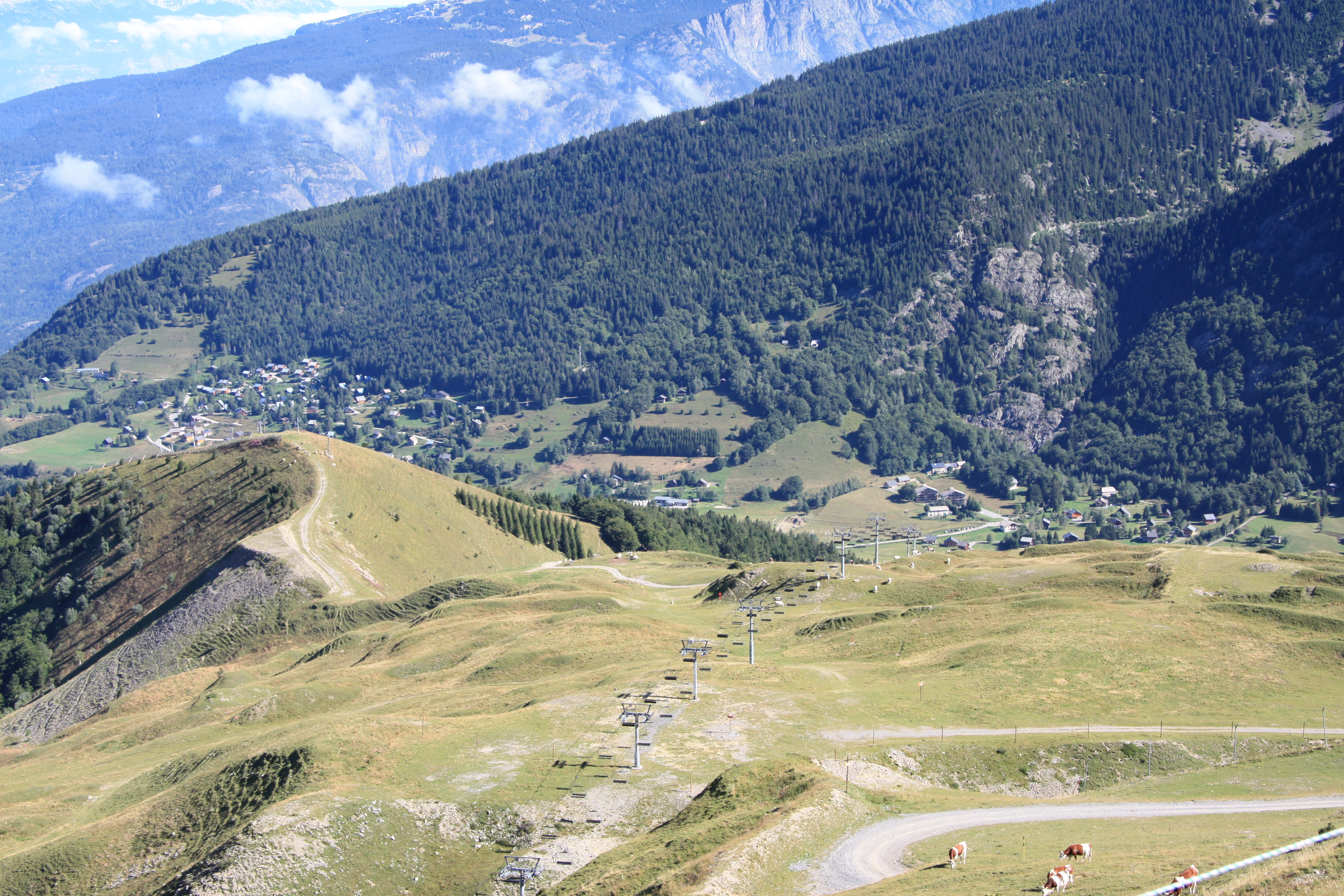
- Summer view upon the ski area

- Location within France Location within Auvergne-Rhône-Alpes Location within Alps
- Location: La Morte, Isère, Auvergne-Rhône-Alpes, France
- Nearest major city: Grenoble
- Coordinates: 45°01′26″N 5°51′44″E
- Top elevation: 2,184 m (7,165 ft)
- Base elevation: 1,368 m (4,488 ft)
- Skiable area: 55 km (34 mi) of marked trails
- Trails: 35 (5 green, 16 blue, 11 red & 3 black)
- Lift system: 14 (3 chair lifts, 11 surface lifts)
- Snowmaking: 27
- Website: www.alpe-du-grand-serre.fr

Alpe du Grand Serre is a ski resort located in the commune of La Morte in the department of Isère and region of Auvergne-Rhône-Alpes, France. The resort is in the French Dauphine Alps at an altitude of 1,368 m (4,488 ft). The village itself is located at the summit of a mountain pass at the gates of the Oisans valley, between the Romanche valley and the Roizonne valley. Neighbouring mountains are the Taillefer (2,857 m (9,373 ft)) and the Grand Serre summit (2,141 m (7,024 ft)). It remains a small mountain village with traditional alpine buildings and atmosphere. Thus, it is mostly visited by local people and families from the Grenoble urban area. It was announced in October 2024 that the resort would not open for 2024

== History ==
The ski resort has been created in 1938 in the village of "La Morte". Its name changed to Alpe du Grand Serre in the 1960s with the build of the Petit Mollard lift. Today, the skiable area represents some 220 ha (540 acres), based upon 14 lifts. Having been historically ruled by the commune of La Morte, the ski resort of Alpe du Grand Serre has been managed since 2001 by société d'aménagement touristique Alpe d'Huez grand domaine (S.A.T.A.).

== Technical characteristics ==
Skilifts :

- 3 chair lifts;
- 9 surface lifts;

== See also ==
- Commune of La Morte
