= Auris, Isère =

Auris
- Commune
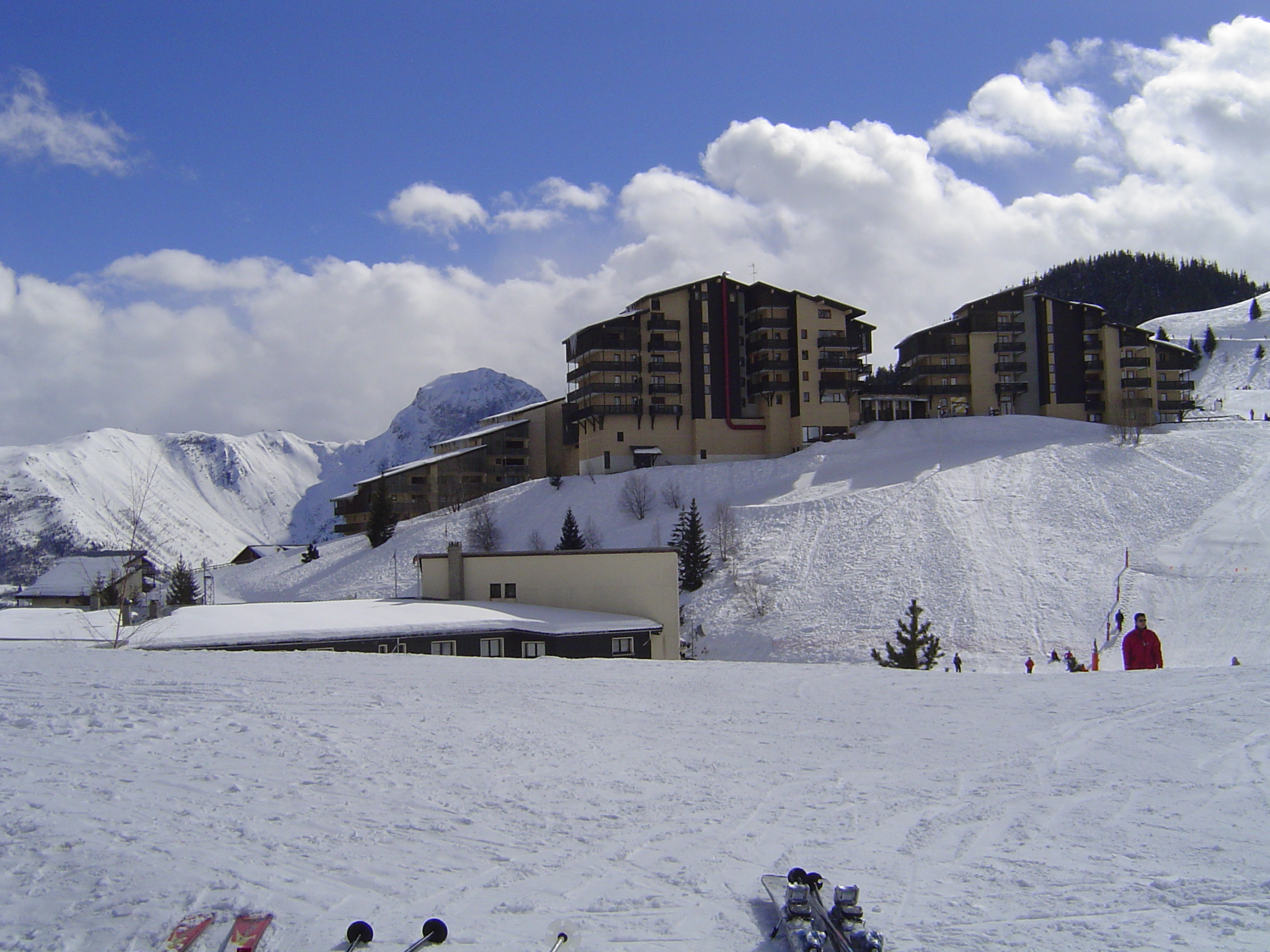
- The Auris-en-Oisans Ski Station
- Location of Auris
- Location within France Location within Auvergne-Rhône-Alpes
- Coordinates: 45°02′50″N 6°05′15″E
- Country: France
- Region: Auvergne-Rhône-Alpes
- Department: Isère
- Arrondissement: Grenoble
- Canton: Oisans-Romanche
- Intercommunality: CC Oisans

Government
  - Mayor (2020–2026): Yves Moiroux
- Area^{1}: 11 km^{2} (4.2 sq mi)
- Elevation: 1,240 m (4,070 ft)
- Highest elevation: 2,164 m (7,100 ft)
- Lowest elevation: 720 m (2,360 ft)
- Population (2023): 189
  - Density: 17/km^{2} (45/sq mi)
- Time zone: UTC+01:00 (CET)
  - Summer (DST): UTC+02:00 (CEST)
- INSEE/Postal code: 38020 /38142
- ^{1} French Land Register data, which excludes lakes, ponds, glaciers > 1 km^{2} (0.386 sq mi or 247 acres) and river estuaries.

Auris (French pronunciation: [oʁis]) is a commune in the Isère department in the Auvergne-Rhône-Alpes region of south-eastern France.

== Geography ==
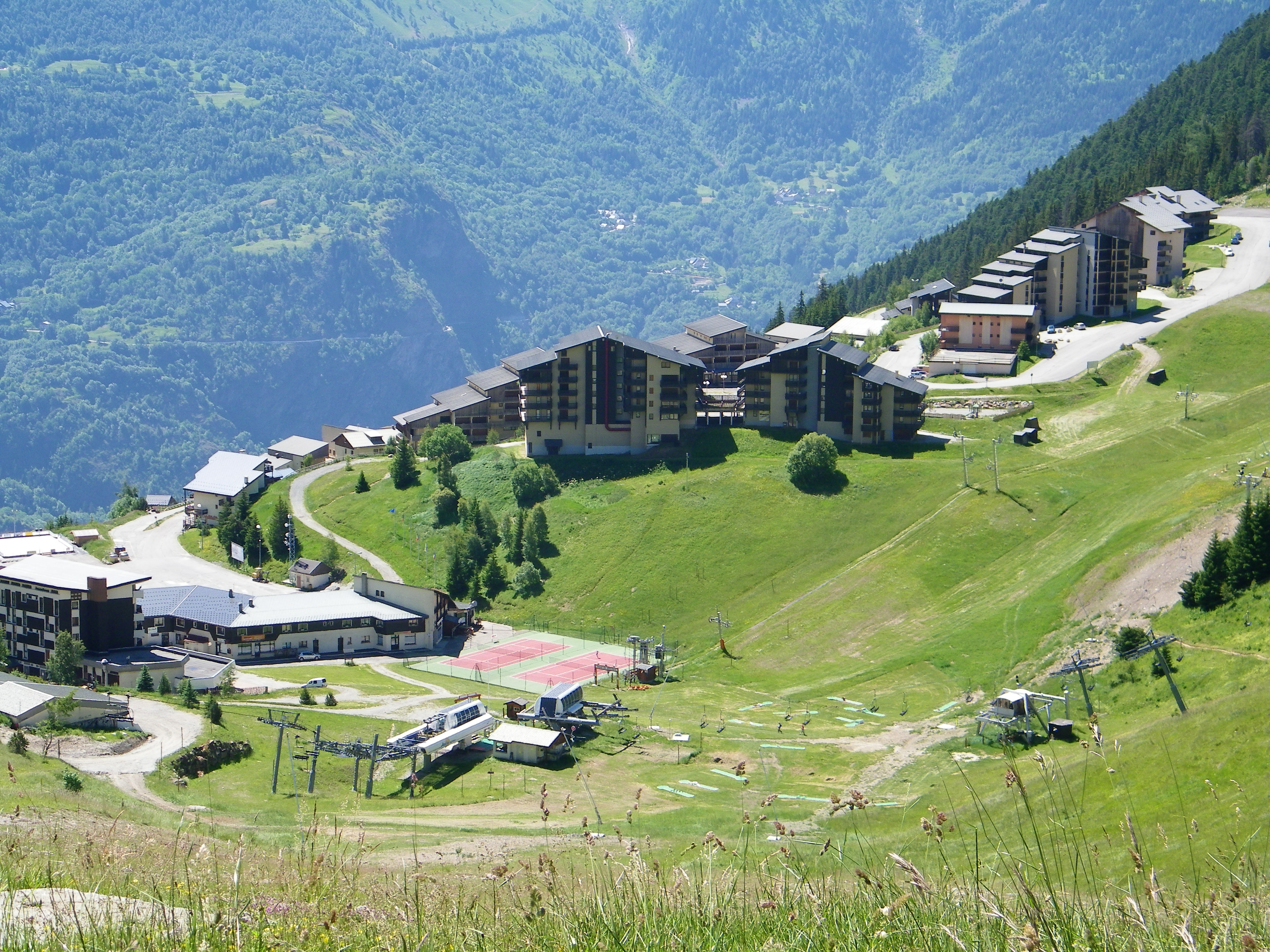
Auris-en-Oisans Ski station in Summer

Auris is an alpine commune some 30 km south-east of Grenoble and 5 km west of Mont-de-Lans. Access to the commune is by the D211A road from La Garde in the west which passes through the commune by a tortuous route and continues east to Le Freney-d'Oisans. The D211E branches off the D211A in the commune to go to La Grand Combe. Apart from the village (which is solely the town hall) there is the hamlet of Les Cours to the north and Le Cert and Les Chatains to the south. The commune is rugged with alpine terrain and a large forest to the west of the village (La Forêt).

The Romanche river forms the southern border of the commune as it flows west to the Barrage du Clapier – an artificial lake on the southern border of the commune – then continues west then north to eventually join the Drac at Jarrie. The Venéon river flows from the south through the south-western extension of the commune to join the Romanche there.

== Toponymy ==
The commune is sometimes informally called Auris-en-Oisans.

== Administration ==
List of Successive Mayors

From	To	Name
2001	2007	Lucien Ponce
2007	2014	Jean Luc Pellorce
2014	2026	Yves Moiroux

== Demography ==
The inhabitants of the commune are known as Aurienchons or Aurienchonnes in French.

Historical population

Year	Pop.	±% p.a.
1793	412	—
1821	728	+2.05%
1846	755	+0.15%
1872	699	−0.30%
1901	571	−0.70%
1926	331	−2.16%
1946	253	−1.33%
1962	173	−2.35%
1968	144	−3.01%

Year	Pop.	±% p.a.
1975	129	−1.56%
1982	229	+8.54%
1990	206	−1.31%
1999	215	+0.48%
2007	205	−0.59%
2012	201	−0.39%
2017	190	−1.12%
2023	189	−0.09%

Source: EHESS and INSEE

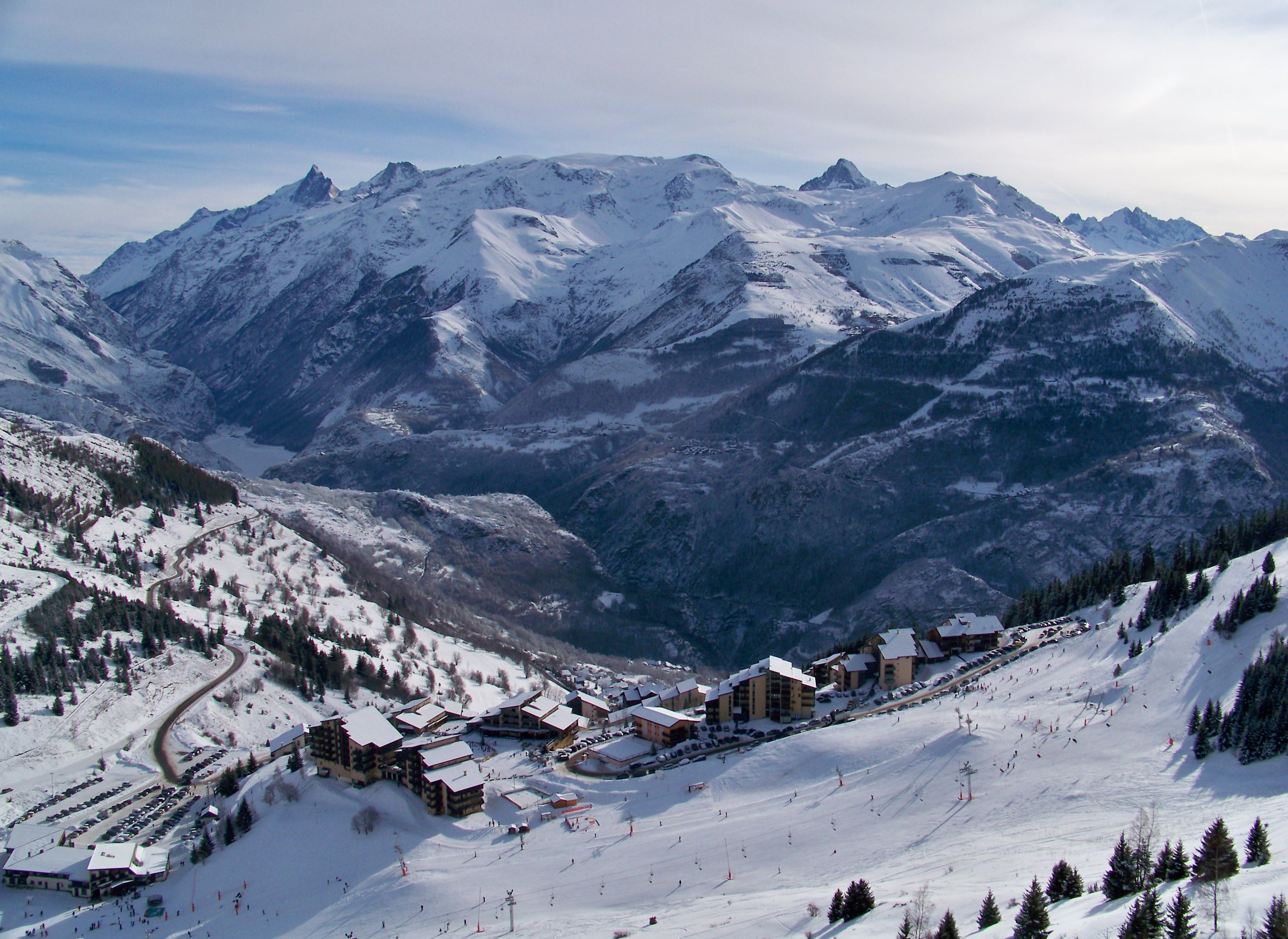
Auris-en-Oisans from the Sures ski lift

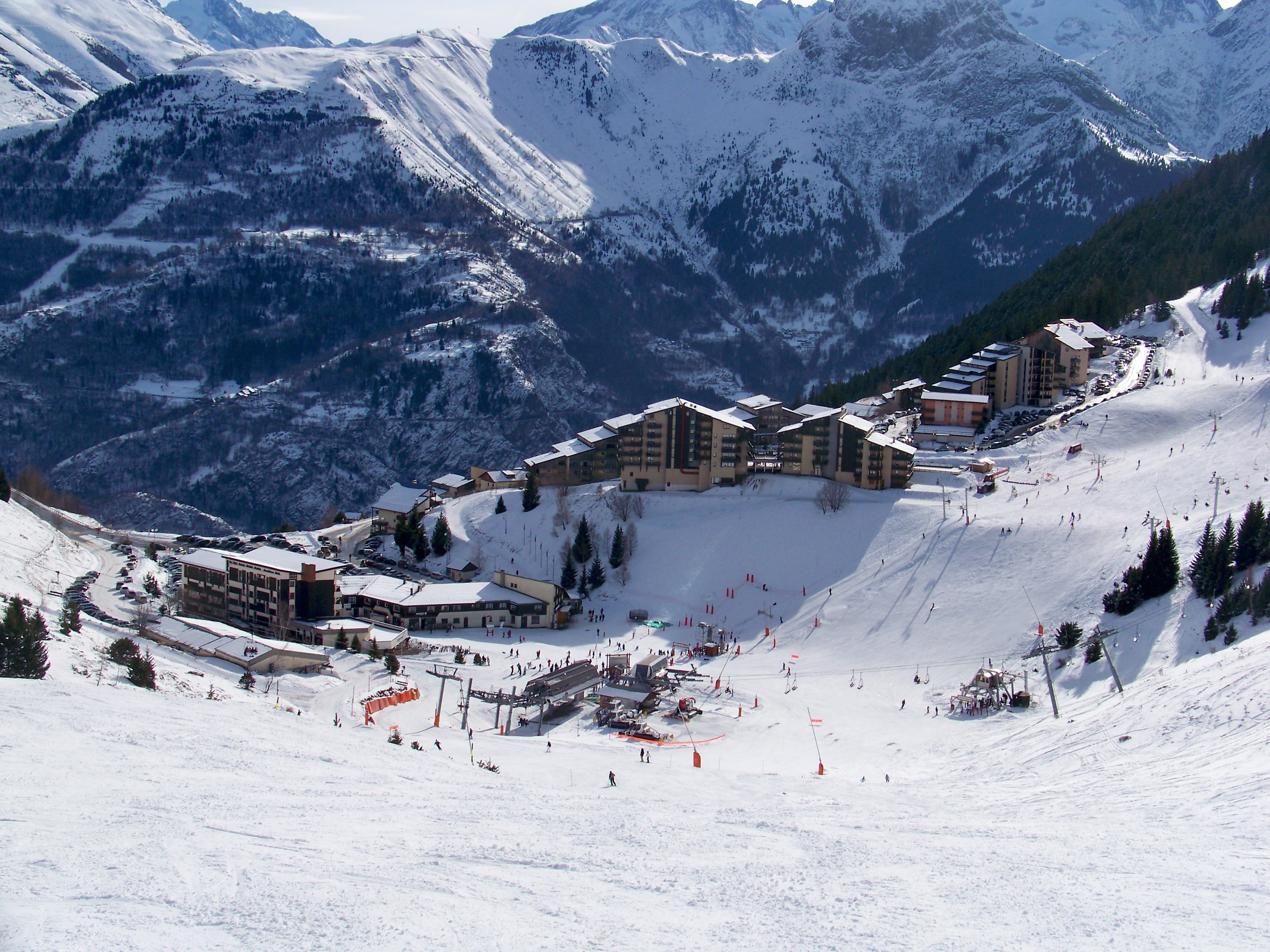
Auris from the slopes

== Culture and heritage ==
=== Civil heritage ===
- A Roman bridge
- The Rural Museum

=== Religious heritage ===
- The Chapel of the Angels (17th century). The Chapel contains several items that are registered as historical objects:
  - 2 Candlesticks on the main Altar (17th century)
  - A Hand Bell (18th century)
  - The Altar and Retable (17th century)
- The Chapel of Saint-Gerald (1497)

== See also ==
- Communes of the Isère department
