= Saint-Barthélemy-de-Séchilienne =

Saint-Barthélémy-de-Séchilienne
- Commune
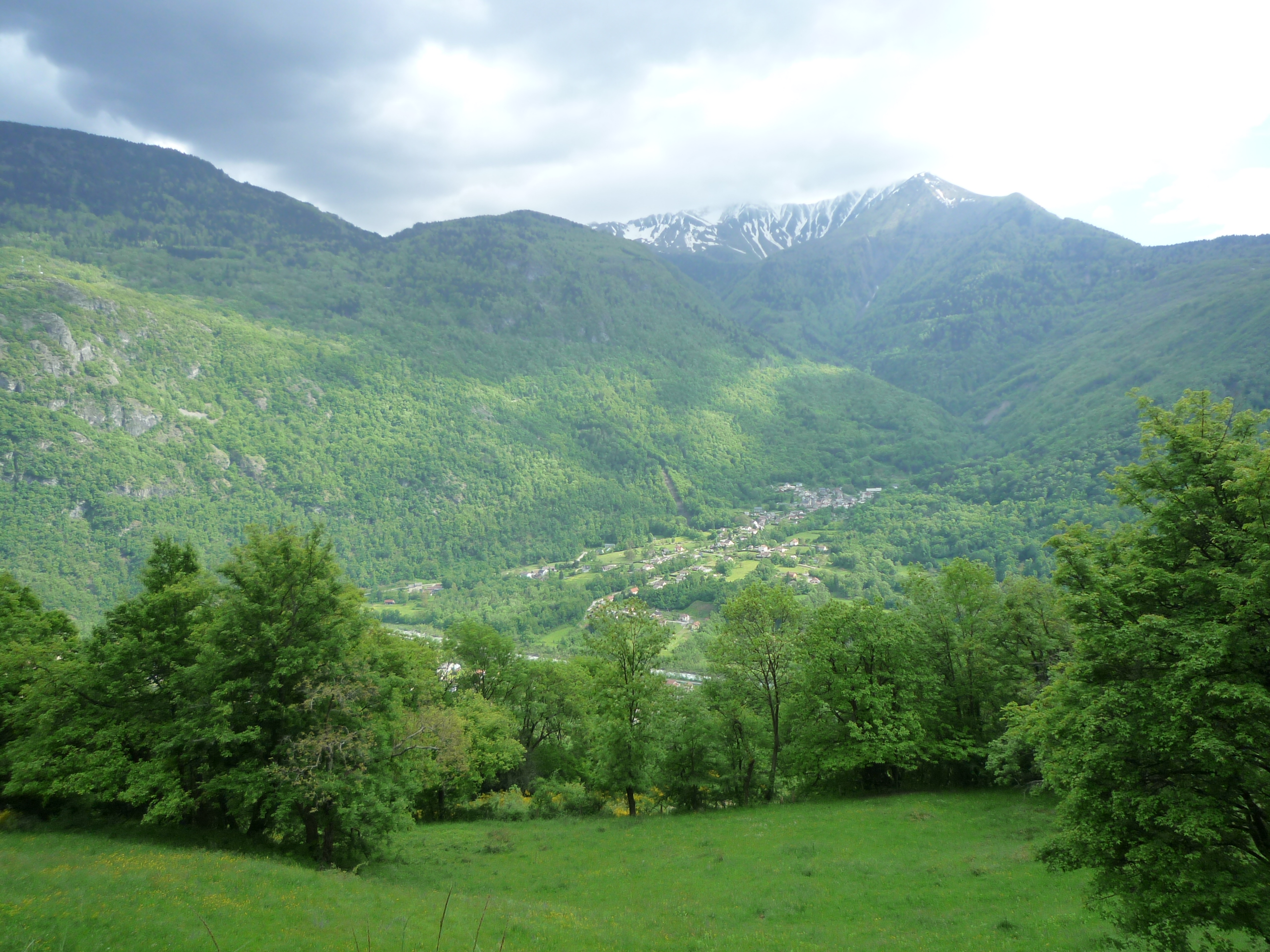
- A general view of Saint-Barthélemy-de-Séchilienne
- Location of Saint-Barthélémy-de-Séchilienne
- Location within France Location within Auvergne-Rhône-Alpes
- Coordinates: 45°02′36″N 5°49′31″E
- Country: France
- Region: Auvergne-Rhône-Alpes
- Department: Isère
- Arrondissement: Grenoble
- Canton: Oisans-Romanche
- Intercommunality: Grenoble-Alpes Métropole

Government
  - Mayor (2020–2026): Gilles Strappazzon
- Area^{1}: 12.10 km^{2} (4.67 sq mi)
- Elevation: 450 m (1,480 ft)
- Highest elevation: 1,925 m (6,316 ft)
- Lowest elevation: 301 m (988 ft)
- Population (2023): 423
  - Density: 35.0/km^{2} (90.5/sq mi)
- Time zone: UTC+01:00 (CET)
  - Summer (DST): UTC+02:00 (CEST)
- INSEE/Postal code: 38364 /38220
- ^{1} French Land Register data, which excludes lakes, ponds, glaciers > 1 km^{2} (0.386 sq mi or 247 acres) and river estuaries.

Saint-Barthélemy-de-Séchilienne (French pronunciation: [sɛ̃ baʁtelemi də seʃiljɛn], literally Saint-Barthélemy of Séchilienne; Arpitan: Sant-Bartelomél-de-Cèchelièna) is a commune in the Isère department in southeastern France.

== Population ==
Historical population
Year	Pop.	±% p.a.
1968	361	—
1975	358	−0.12%
1982	525	+5.62%
1990	635	+2.41%
1999	530	−1.99%
2007	454	−1.92%
2012	487	+1.41%
2017	433	−2.32%
2023	423	−0.39%
Source: INSEE

== See also ==
- Communes of the Isère department
