= Oz, Isère =

Oz
- Commune
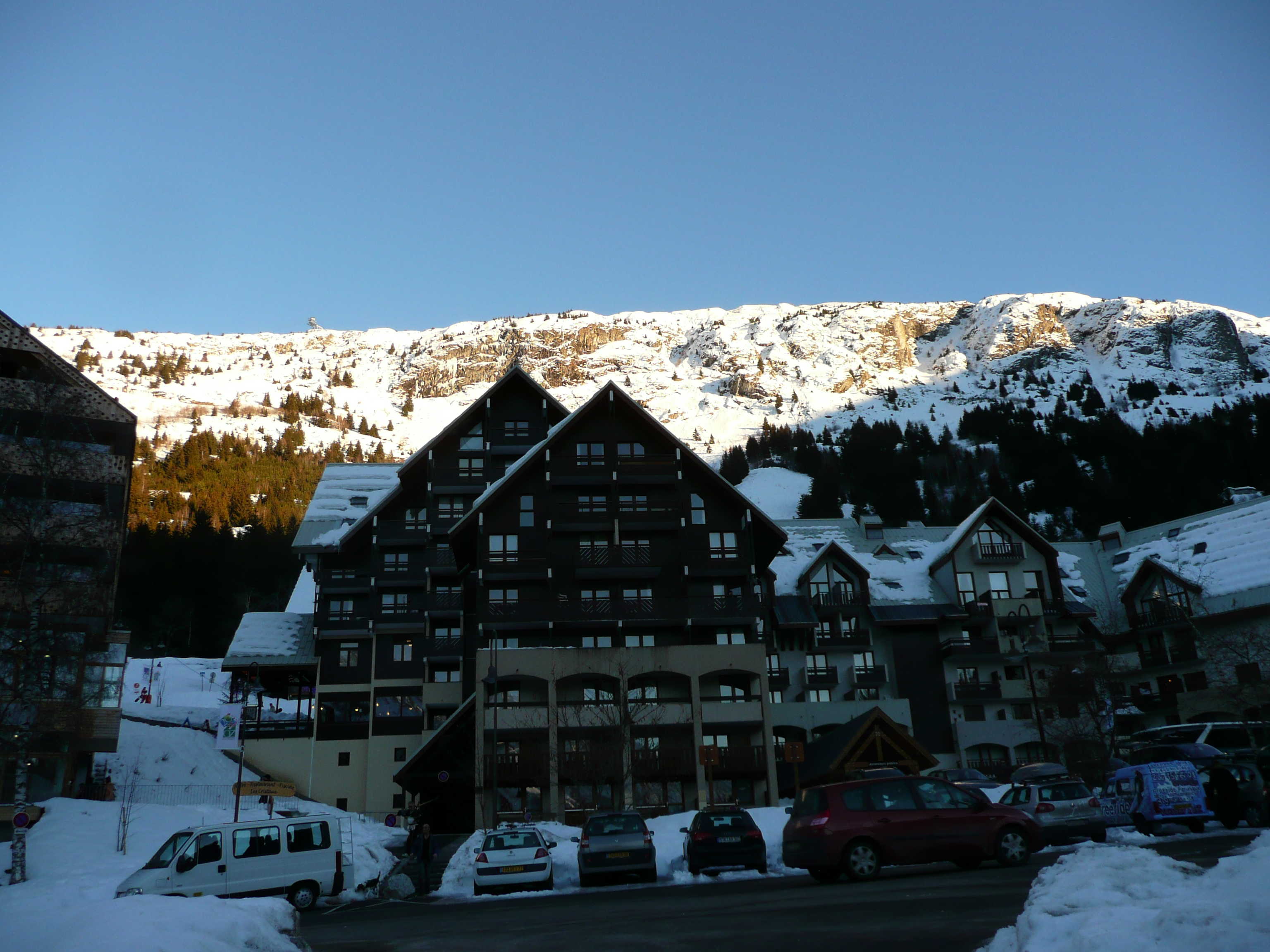
- The ski station of Oz
- Location of Oz
- Location within France Location within Auvergne-Rhône-Alpes
- Coordinates: 45°08′26″N 6°03′04″E
- Country: France
- Region: Auvergne-Rhône-Alpes
- Department: Isère
- Arrondissement: Grenoble
- Canton: Oisans-Romanche

Government
  - Mayor (2021–2026): Philippe Sage
- Area^{1}: 16.8 km^{2} (6.5 sq mi)
- Elevation: 810 m (2,660 ft)
- Highest elevation: 3,320 m (10,890 ft)
- Lowest elevation: 716 m (2,349 ft)
- Population (2023): 217
  - Density: 12.9/km^{2} (33.5/sq mi)
- Time zone: UTC+01:00 (CET)
  - Summer (DST): UTC+02:00 (CEST)
- INSEE/Postal code: 38289 /38114
- ^{1} French Land Register data, which excludes lakes, ponds, glaciers > 1 km^{2} (0.386 sq mi or 247 acres) and river estuaries.

Oz is a commune in the Isère department in southeastern France.

== Population ==
Historical population
Year	Pop.	±% p.a.
1968	139	—
1975	105	−3.93%
1982	127	+2.75%
1990	136	+0.86%
1999	153	+1.32%
2007	206	+3.79%
2012	233	+2.49%
2017	235	+0.17%
2023	217	−1.32%
Source: INSEE

== See also ==
- Communes of the Isère department
