= Clavans-en-Haut-Oisans =

- Commune
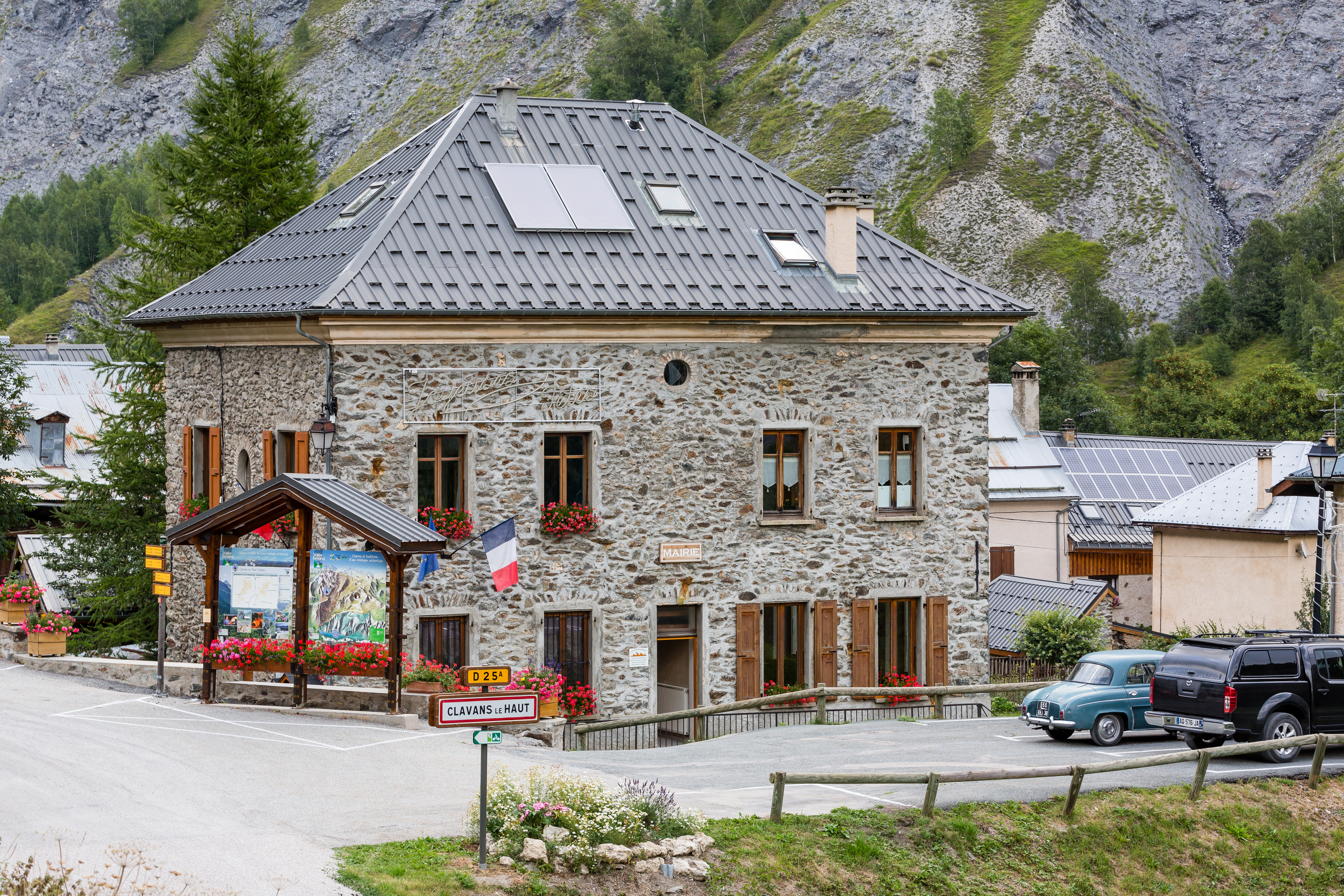
- Town hall
- Location of Clavans-en-Haut-Oisans
- Location within France Location within Auvergne-Rhône-Alpes
- Coordinates: 45°05′04″N 6°09′49″E
- Country: France
- Region: Auvergne-Rhône-Alpes
- Department: Isère
- Arrondissement: Grenoble
- Canton: Oisans-Romanche

Government
  - Mayor (2024–2026): Serge Tommasi
- Area^{1}: 16 km^{2} (6.2 sq mi)
- Elevation: 1,394 m (4,573 ft)
- Highest elevation: 3,464 m (11,365 ft)
- Lowest elevation: 1,024 m (3,360 ft)
- Population (2023): 73
  - Density: 4.6/km^{2} (12/sq mi)
- Time zone: UTC+01:00 (CET)
  - Summer (DST): UTC+02:00 (CEST)
- INSEE/Postal code: 38112 /38142
- ^{1} French Land Register data, which excludes lakes, ponds, glaciers > 1 km^{2} (0.386 sq mi or 247 acres) and river estuaries.

Clavans-en-Haut-Oisans (French pronunciation: [klavɑ̃ ɑ̃ o(t‿)wazɑ̃], lit. 'Clavans in Upper Oisans') is a commune in the Isère department in southeastern France.

Inhabitants of Clavans-en-Haut-Oisans are called Clavanchons (male) or Clavanchonnes (female).

== Population ==
Historical population
Year	Pop.	±% p.a.
1968	80	—
1975	68	−2.29%
1982	66	−0.43%
1990	88	+3.66%
1999	83	−0.65%
2007	113	+3.93%
2012	110	−0.54%
2017	101	−1.69%
2023	73	−5.27%
Source: INSEE

== See also ==
- Communes of the Isère department
