= Canton of Oisans-Romanche =

Coordinates: 45.08°N 5.77°E

The canton of Oisans-Romanche is an administrative division of the Isère department, eastern France. It was created at the French canton reorganisation which came into effect in March 2015. Its seat is in Vizille.

It consists of the following communes:

1. Allemond
2. Auris
3. Besse
4. Le Bourg-d'Oisans
5. Chamrousse
6. Clavans-en-Haut-Oisans
7. Les Deux Alpes
8. Le Freney-d'Oisans
9. La Garde
10. Huez
11. Livet-et-Gavet
12. Mizoën
13. Montchaboud
14. La Morte
15. Notre-Dame-de-Mésage
16. Ornon
17. Oulles
18. Oz
19. Saint-Barthélemy-de-Séchilienne
20. Saint-Christophe-en-Oisans
21. Saint-Martin-d'Uriage
22. Saint-Pierre-de-Mésage
23. Séchilienne
24. Vaujany
25. Vaulnaveys-le-Bas
26. Vaulnaveys-le-Haut
27. Villard-Notre-Dame
28. Villard-Reculas
29. Villard-Reymond
30. Vizille
