= Vaulnaveys-le-Bas =

- Commune
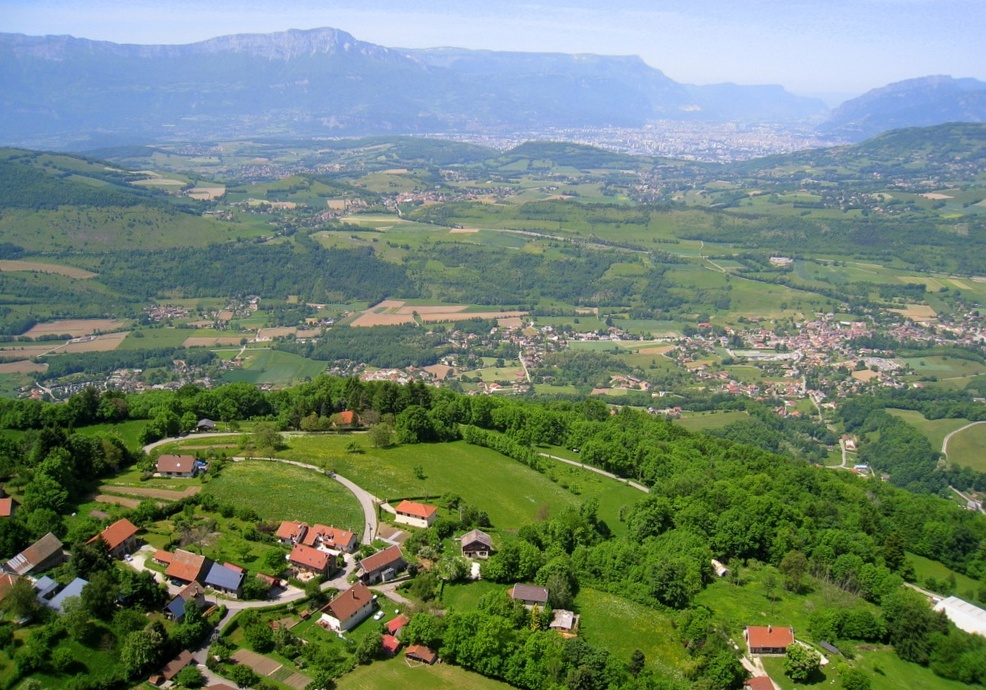
- An aerial view of Montchaffrey

- Coat of arms
- Location of Vaulnaveys-le-Bas
- Location within France Location within Auvergne-Rhône-Alpes
- Coordinates: 45°06′18″N 5°48′09″E
- Country: France
- Region: Auvergne-Rhône-Alpes
- Department: Isère
- Arrondissement: Grenoble
- Canton: Oisans-Romanche
- Intercommunality: Grenoble-Alpes Métropole

Government
  - Mayor (2020–2026): Jean-Marc Gauthier
- Area^{1}: 11.90 km^{2} (4.59 sq mi)
- Elevation: 326 m (1,070 ft)
- Highest elevation: 1,326 m (4,350 ft)
- Lowest elevation: 287 m (942 ft)
- Population (2023): 1,398
  - Density: 117.5/km^{2} (304.3/sq mi)
- Time zone: UTC+01:00 (CET)
  - Summer (DST): UTC+02:00 (CEST)
- INSEE/Postal code: 38528 /38410
- ^{1} French Land Register data, which excludes lakes, ponds, glaciers > 1 km^{2} (0.386 sq mi or 247 acres) and river estuaries.

Vaulnaveys-le-Bas (French pronunciation: [volnavɛ lə ba]; Arpitan: Vâlnavês-d’Avâl) is a commune in the Isère department in southeastern France.

== Population ==
Historical population
Year	Pop.	±% p.a.
1968	420	—
1975	562	+4.25%
1982	774	+4.68%
1990	867	+1.43%
1999	1,173	+3.42%
2007	1,096	−0.85%
2012	1,214	+2.07%
2017	1,282	+1.10%
2023	1,398	+1.45%
Source: INSEE

== See also ==
- Communes of the Isère department
