= Arrondissement of Grenoble =

Coordinates: 45°10′49″N 5°43′16″E

Grenoble
- Arrondissement
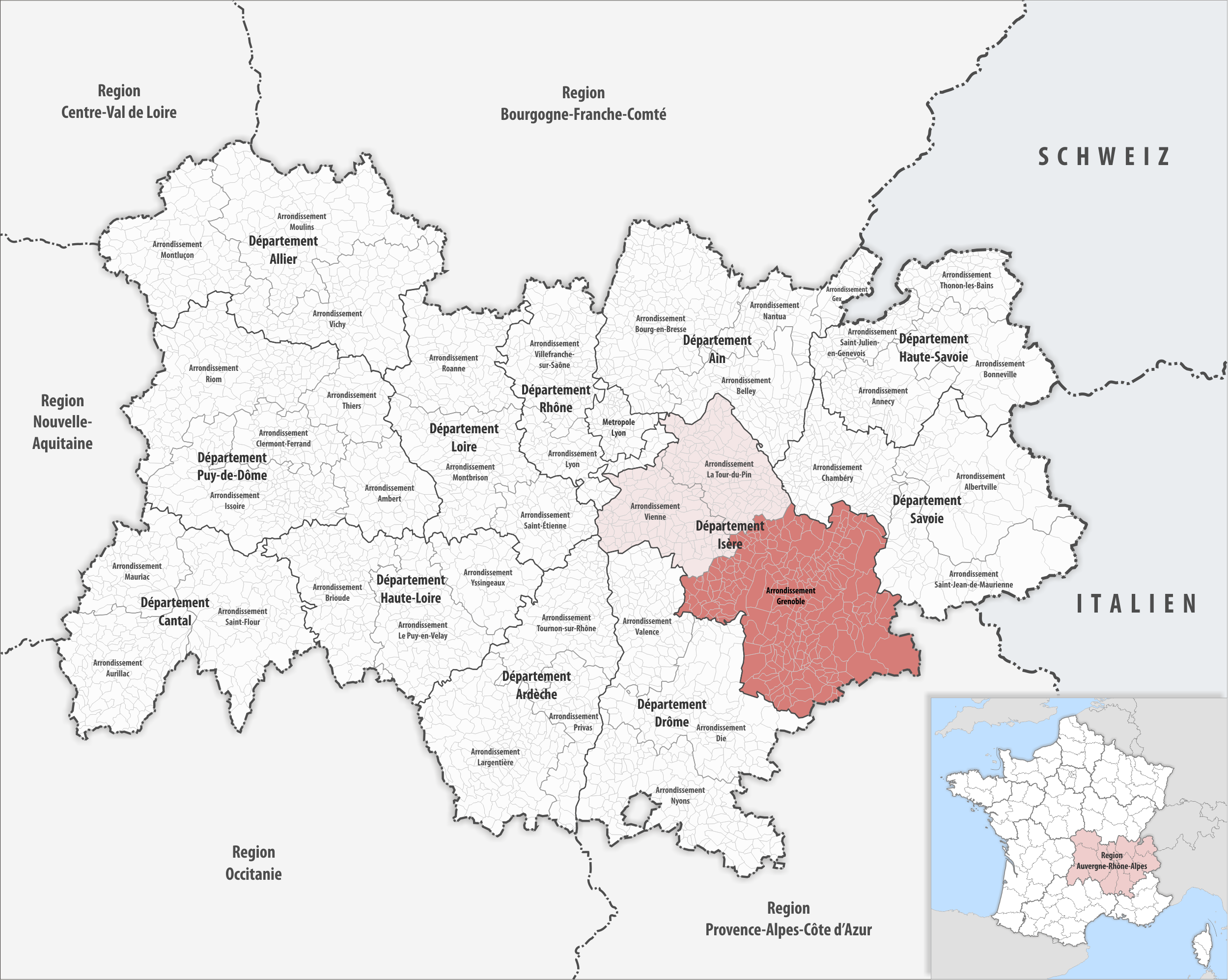
- Location within the region Auvergne-Rhône-Alpes
- Country: France
- Region: Auvergne-Rhône-Alpes
- Department: Isère
- No. of communes: {{{nbcomm}}}
- Area: 4,398.7 km^{2} (1,698.3 sq mi)
- Population (2023): 753,318
  - Density: 171.26/km^{2} (443.56/sq mi)
- INSEE code: 381

The arrondissement of Grenoble is an arrondissement of France in the Isère department in the Auvergne-Rhône-Alpes region. It has 263 communes. Its population is 748,885 (2021), and its area is 4,398.7 km^{2} (1,698.3 sq mi).

== Composition ==
The communes of the arrondissement of Grenoble, and their INSEE codes, are:

1. Les Adrets (38002)
2. L'Albenc (38004)
3. Allemond (38005)
4. Allevard (38006)
5. Ambel (38008)
6. Auberives-en-Royans (38018)
7. Auris (38020)
8. Autrans-Méaudre-en-Vercors (38225)
9. Avignonet (38023)
10. Barraux (38027)
11. Beaucroissant (38030)
12. Beaufin (38031)
13. Beaulieu (38033)
14. Beauvoir-en-Royans (38036)
15. Bernin (38039)
16. Besse (38040)
17. Bessins (38041)
18. Biviers (38045)
19. Le Bourg-d'Oisans (38052)
20. Bresson (38057)
21. Brié-et-Angonnes (38059)
22. La Buisse (38061)
23. La Buissière (38062)
24. Champagnier (38068)
25. Le Champ-près-Froges (38070)
26. Champ-sur-Drac (38071)
27. Chamrousse (38567)
28. Chantepérier (38073)
29. Chantesse (38074)
30. Chapareillan (38075)
31. La Chapelle-du-Bard (38078)
32. Charnècles (38084)
33. Chasselay (38086)
34. Château-Bernard (38090)
35. Châtel-en-Trièves (38456)
36. Châtelus (38092)
37. Chatte (38095)
38. Chevrières (38099)
39. Le Cheylas (38100)
40. Chichilianne (38103)
41. Chirens (38105)
42. Cholonge (38106)
43. Choranche (38108)
44. Claix (38111)
45. Clavans-en-Haut-Oisans (38112)
46. Clelles (38113)
47. Cognet (38116)
48. Cognin-les-Gorges (38117)
49. La Combe-de-Lancey (38120)
50. Corenc (38126)
51. Cornillon-en-Trièves (38127)
52. Corps (38128)
53. Corrençon-en-Vercors (38129)
54. Les Côtes-de-Corps (38132)
55. Coublevie (38133)
56. Cras (38137)
57. Crêts-en-Belledonne (38439)
58. Crolles (38140)
59. Les Deux Alpes (38253)
60. Domène (38150)
61. Échirolles (38151)
62. Engins (38153)
63. Entraigues (38154)
64. Entre-deux-Guiers (38155)
65. Eybens (38158)
66. La Flachère (38166)
67. Fontaine (38169)
68. Fontanil-Cornillon (38170)
69. Le Freney-d'Oisans (38173)
70. Froges (38175)
71. La Garde (38177)
72. Gières (38179)
73. Goncelin (38181)
74. Grenoble (38185)
75. Gresse-en-Vercors (38186)
76. Le Gua (38187)
77. Le Haut-Bréda (38163)
78. Herbeys (38188)
79. Huez (38191)
80. Hurtières (38192)
81. Izeaux (38194)
82. Izeron (38195)
83. Jarrie (38200)
84. Laffrey (38203)
85. Lalley (38204)
86. Lans-en-Vercors (38205)
87. Lavaldens (38207)
88. Laval-en-Belledonne (38206)
89. Lavars (38208)
90. Livet-et-Gavet (38212)
91. Lumbin (38214)
92. Malleval-en-Vercors (38216)
93. Marcieu (38217)
94. Mayres-Savel (38224)
95. Mens (38226)
96. Meylan (38229)
97. Miribel-Lanchâtre (38235)
98. Miribel-les-Échelles (38236)
99. Mizoën (38237)
100. Moirans (38239)
101. Monestier-d'Ambel (38241)
102. Monestier-de-Clermont (38242)
103. Le Monestier-du-Percy (38243)
104. Montagne (38245)
105. Montaud (38248)
106. Montbonnot-Saint-Martin (38249)
107. Montchaboud (38252)
108. Monteynard (38254)
109. Mont-Saint-Martin (38258)
110. Morette (38263)
111. La Morte (38264)
112. La Motte-d'Aveillans (38265)
113. La Motte-Saint-Martin (38266)
114. Le Moutaret (38268)
115. La Mure (38269)
116. La Murette (38270)
117. Murianette (38271)
118. Murinais (38272)
119. Nantes-en-Ratier (38273)
120. Notre-Dame-de-Commiers (38277)
121. Notre-Dame-de-l'Osier (38278)
122. Notre-Dame-de-Mésage (38279)
123. Notre-Dame-de-Vaulx (38280)
124. Noyarey (38281)
125. Oris-en-Rattier (38283)
126. Ornon (38285)
127. Oulles (38286)
128. Oz (38289)
129. Pellafol (38299)
130. Percy (38301)
131. La Pierre (38303)
132. Pierre-Châtel (38304)
133. Plateau-des-Petites-Roches (38395)
134. Poisat (38309)
135. Poliénas (38310)
136. Ponsonnas (38313)
137. Pontcharra (38314)
138. Le Pont-de-Claix (38317)
139. Pont-en-Royans (38319)
140. Prébois (38321)
141. Presles (38322)
142. Proveysieux (38325)
143. Prunières (38326)
144. Quaix-en-Chartreuse (38328)
145. Quet-en-Beaumont (38329)
146. Quincieu (38330)
147. Réaumont (38331)
148. Renage (38332)
149. Rencurel (38333)
150. Revel (38334)
151. Rives (38337)
152. La Rivière (38338)
153. Roissard (38342)
154. Rovon (38345)
155. Saint-Andéol (38355)
156. Saint-André-en-Royans (38356)
157. Saint-Antoine-l'Abbaye (38359)
158. Saint-Appolinard (38360)
159. Saint-Arey (38361)
160. Saint-Aupre (38362)
161. Saint-Barthélemy-de-Séchilienne (38364)
162. Saint-Baudille-et-Pipet (38366)
163. Saint-Blaise-du-Buis (38368)
164. Saint-Bonnet-de-Chavagne (38370)
165. Saint-Cassien (38373)
166. Saint-Christophe-en-Oisans (38375)
167. Saint-Christophe-sur-Guiers (38376)
168. Sainte-Agnès (38350)
169. Saint-Égrève (38382)
170. Sainte-Luce (38414)
171. Sainte-Marie-d'Alloix (38417)
172. Sainte-Marie-du-Mont (38418)
173. Saint-Étienne-de-Crossey (38383)
174. Saint-Georges-de-Commiers (38388)
175. Saint-Gervais (38390)
176. Saint-Guillaume (38391)
177. Saint-Hilaire-du-Rosier (38394)
178. Saint-Honoré (38396)
179. Saint-Ismier (38397)
180. Saint-Jean-de-Moirans (38400)
181. Saint-Jean-de-Vaulx (38402)
182. Saint-Jean-d'Hérans (38403)
183. Saint-Jean-le-Vieux (38404)
184. Saint-Joseph-de-Rivière (38405)
185. Saint-Just-de-Claix (38409)
186. Saint-Lattier (38410)
187. Saint-Laurent-du-Pont (38412)
188. Saint-Laurent-en-Beaumont (38413)
189. Saint-Marcellin (38416)
190. Saint-Martin-de-Clelles (38419)
191. Saint-Martin-de-la-Cluze (38115)
192. Saint-Martin-d'Hères (38421)
193. Saint-Martin-d'Uriage (38422)
194. Saint-Martin-le-Vinoux (38423)
195. Saint-Maurice-en-Trièves (38424)
196. Saint-Maximin (38426)
197. Saint-Michel-en-Beaumont (38428)
198. Saint-Michel-les-Portes (38429)
199. Saint-Mury-Monteymond (38430)
200. Saint-Nazaire-les-Eymes (38431)
201. Saint-Nicolas-de-Macherin (38432)
202. Saint-Nizier-du-Moucherotte (38433)
203. Saint-Paul-de-Varces (38436)
204. Saint-Paul-lès-Monestier (38438)
205. Saint-Pierre-de-Chartreuse (38442)
206. Saint-Pierre-de-Chérennes (38443)
207. Saint-Pierre-de-Méaroz (38444)
208. Saint-Pierre-de-Mésage (38445)
209. Saint-Pierre-d'Entremont (38446)
210. Saint-Quentin-sur-Isère (38450)
211. Saint-Romans (38453)
212. Saint-Sauveur (38454)
213. Saint-Théoffrey (38462)
214. Saint-Vérand (38463)
215. Saint-Vincent-de-Mercuze (38466)
216. La Salette-Fallavaux (38469)
217. La Salle-en-Beaumont (38470)
218. Le Sappey-en-Chartreuse (38471)
219. Sarcenas (38472)
220. Sassenage (38474)
221. Séchilienne (38478)
222. Serre-Nerpol (38275)
223. Seyssinet-Pariset (38485)
224. Seyssins (38486)
225. Siévoz (38489)
226. Sinard (38492)
227. La Sône (38495)
228. Sousville (38497)
229. La Sure en Chartreuse (38407)
230. Susville (38499)
231. Têche (38500)
232. Tencin (38501)
233. La Terrasse (38503)
234. Theys (38504)
235. Le Touvet (38511)
236. Treffort (38513)
237. Tréminis (38514)
238. La Tronche (38516)
239. Tullins (38517)
240. Valbonnais (38518)
241. La Valette (38521)
242. Valjouffrey (38522)
243. Varacieux (38523)
244. Varces-Allières-et-Risset (38524)
245. Vatilieu (38526)
246. Vaujany (38527)
247. Vaulnaveys-le-Bas (38528)
248. Vaulnaveys-le-Haut (38529)
249. Venon (38533)
250. Le Versoud (38538)
251. Veurey-Voroize (38540)
252. Vif (38545)
253. Villard-Bonnot (38547)
254. Villard-de-Lans (38548)
255. Villard-Notre-Dame (38549)
256. Villard-Reculas (38550)
257. Villard-Reymond (38551)
258. Villard-Saint-Christophe (38552)
259. Vinay (38559)
260. Vizille (38562)
261. Voiron (38563)
262. Voreppe (38565)
263. Vourey (38566)

== History ==
The arrondissement of Grenoble was created in 1800. At the January 2017 reorganisation of the arrondissements of Isère, it lost 24 communes to the arrondissement of Vienne.

As a result of the reorganisation of the cantons of France which came into effect in 2015, the borders of the cantons are no longer related to the borders of the arrondissements. The cantons of the arrondissement of Grenoble were, as of January 2015:

1. Allevard
2. Le Bourg-d'Oisans
3. Clelles
4. Corps
5. Domène
6. Échirolles-Est
7. Échirolles-Ouest
8. Eybens
9. Fontaine-Sassenage
10. Fontaine-Seyssinet
11. Goncelin
12. Grenoble-1
13. Grenoble-2
14. Grenoble-3
15. Grenoble-4
16. Grenoble-5
17. Grenoble-6
18. Mens
19. Meylan
20. Monestier-de-Clermont
21. La Mure
22. Pont-en-Royans
23. Rives
24. Roybon
25. Saint-Égrève
26. Saint-Étienne-de-Saint-Geoirs
27. Saint-Ismier
28. Saint-Laurent-du-Pont
29. Saint-Marcellin
30. Saint-Martin-d'Hères-Nord
31. Saint-Martin-d'Hères-Sud
32. Le Touvet
33. Tullins
34. Valbonnais
35. Vif
36. Villard-de-Lans
37. Vinay
38. Vizille
39. Voiron
