= Montchaboud =

- Commune
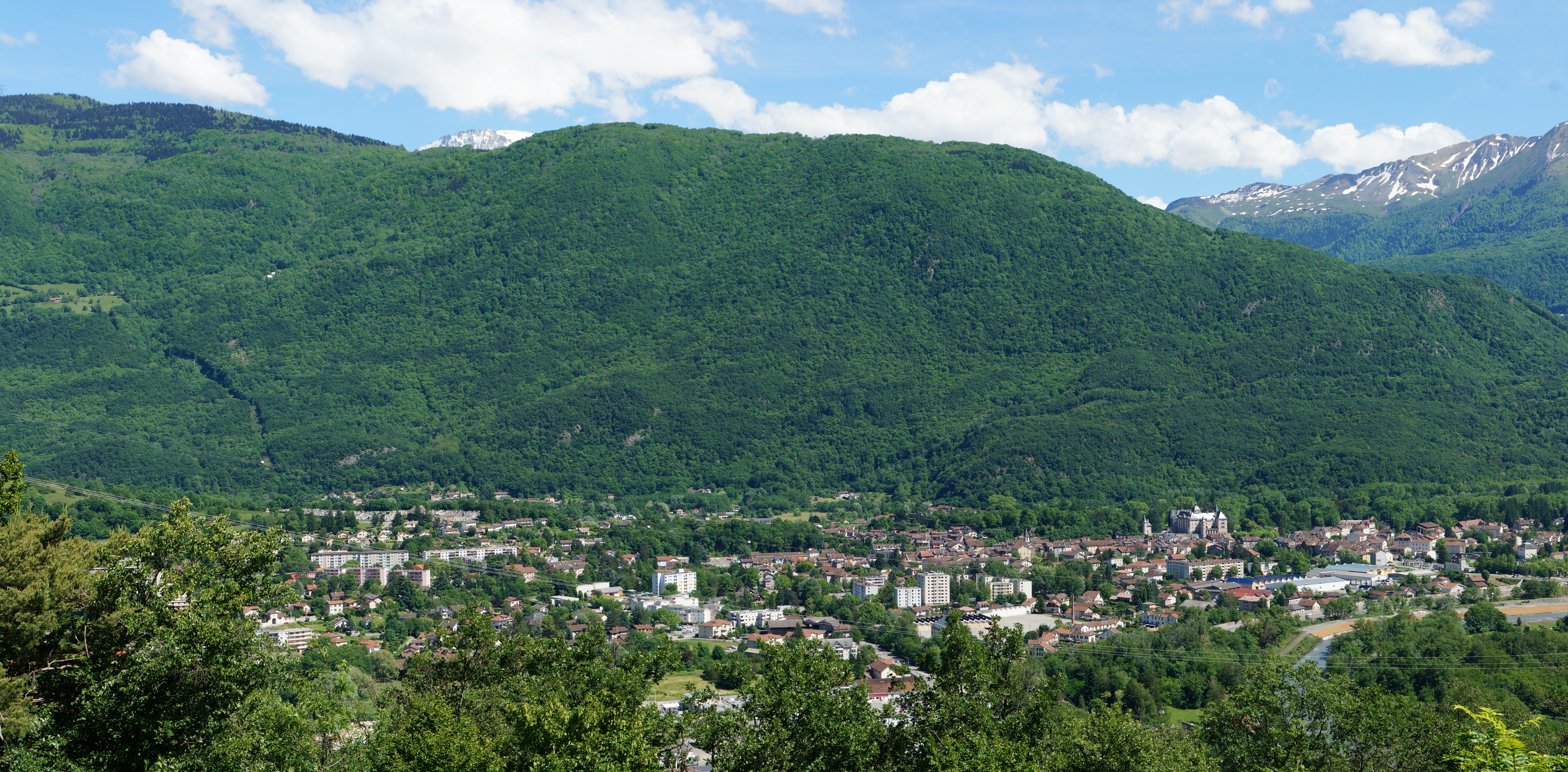
- A general view of Montchaboud
- Location of Montchaboud
- Location within France Location within Auvergne-Rhône-Alpes
- Coordinates: 45°05′43″N 5°45′46″E
- Country: France
- Region: Auvergne-Rhône-Alpes
- Department: Isère
- Arrondissement: Grenoble
- Canton: Oisans-Romanche
- Intercommunality: Grenoble-Alpes Métropole

Government
  - Mayor (2020–2026): Guy Soto
- Area^{1}: 1.96 km^{2} (0.76 sq mi)
- Elevation: 522 m (1,713 ft)
- Highest elevation: 733 m (2,405 ft)
- Lowest elevation: 261 m (856 ft)
- Population (2023): 352
  - Density: 180/km^{2} (465/sq mi)
- Time zone: UTC+01:00 (CET)
  - Summer (DST): UTC+02:00 (CEST)
- INSEE/Postal code: 38252 /38220
- ^{1} French Land Register data, which excludes lakes, ponds, glaciers > 1 km^{2} (0.386 sq mi or 247 acres) and river estuaries.

Montchaboud (French pronunciation: [mɔ̃ʃabu]) is a commune in the Isère department in southeastern France.

== Population ==
Historical population
Year	Pop.	±% p.a.
1968	52	—
1975	228	+23.51%
1982	310	+4.49%
1990	305	−0.20%
1999	335	+1.05%
2007	354	+0.69%
2012	368	+0.78%
2017	339	−1.63%
2023	352	+0.63%
Source: INSEE

== See also ==
- Communes of the Isère department
