= Villard-Reymond =

- Commune
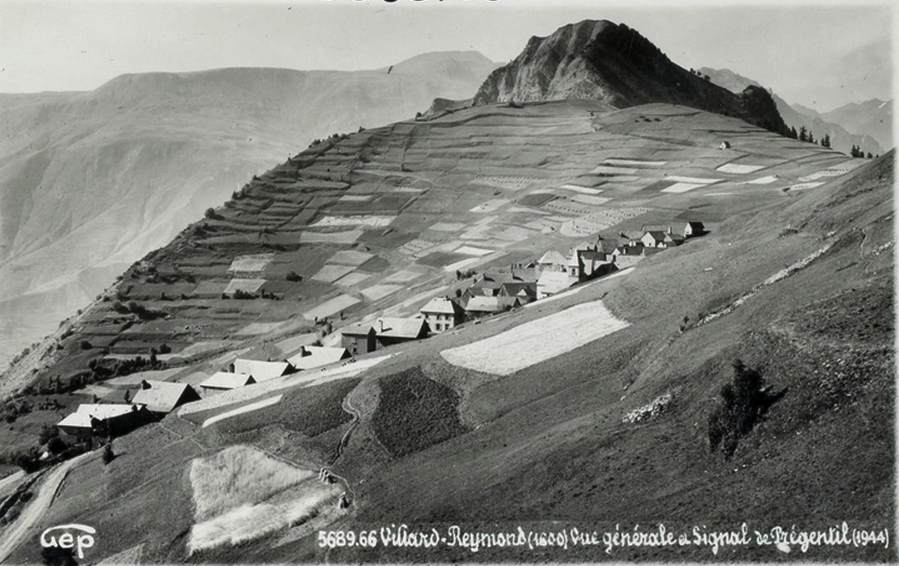
- Villard-Reymond in 1937
- Location of Villard-Reymond
- Location within France Location within Auvergne-Rhône-Alpes
- Coordinates: 45°02′00″N 6°01′05″E
- Country: France
- Region: Auvergne-Rhône-Alpes
- Department: Isère
- Arrondissement: Grenoble
- Canton: Oisans-Romanche

Government
  - Mayor (2020–2026): Chantal Theysset
- Area^{1}: 11 km^{2} (4.2 sq mi)
- Elevation: 1,600 m (5,200 ft)
- Highest elevation: 2,732 m (8,963 ft)
- Lowest elevation: 840 m (2,760 ft)
- Population (2023): 46
  - Density: 4.2/km^{2} (11/sq mi)
- Time zone: UTC+01:00 (CET)
  - Summer (DST): UTC+02:00 (CEST)
- INSEE/Postal code: 38551 /38520
- ^{1} French Land Register data, which excludes lakes, ponds, glaciers > 1 km^{2} (0.386 sq mi or 247 acres) and river estuaries.

Villard-Reymond (French pronunciation: [vilaʁ ʁemɔ̃]) is a commune in the Isère department in southeastern France.

== Population ==
Historical population
Year	Pop.	±% p.a.
1968	14	—
1975	7	−9.43%
1982	25	+19.94%
1990	21	−2.16%
1999	31	+4.42%
2007	47	+5.34%
2012	36	−5.19%
2017	43	+3.62%
2023	46	+1.13%
Source: INSEE

== See also ==
- Communes of the Isère department
