= Oulles =

- Commune
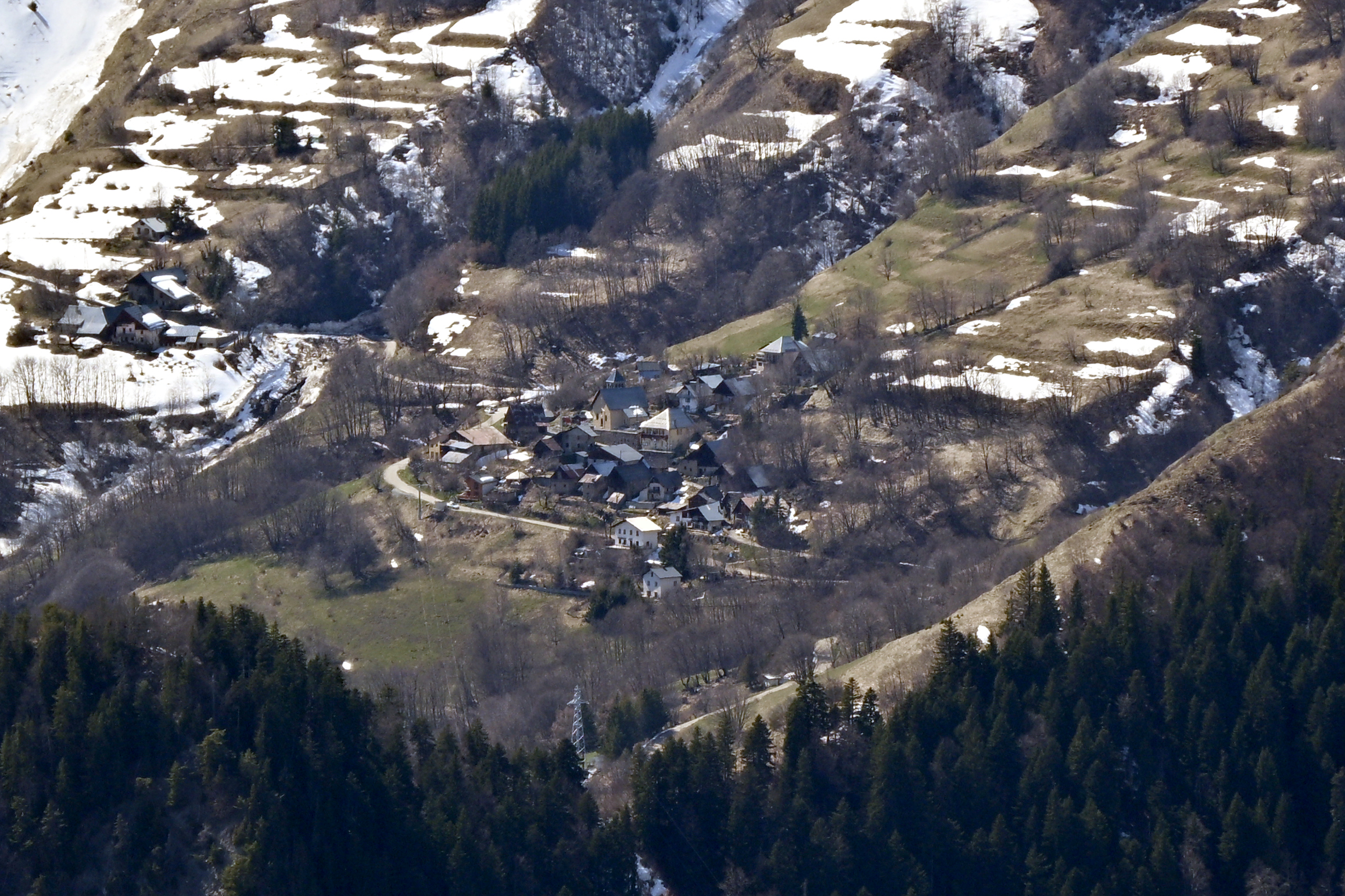
- View of the village of Oulles
- Location of Oulles
- Location within France Location within Auvergne-Rhône-Alpes
- Coordinates: 45°04′30″N 5°59′00″E
- Country: France
- Region: Auvergne-Rhône-Alpes
- Department: Isère
- Arrondissement: Grenoble
- Canton: Oisans-Romanche
- Intercommunality: Oisans

Government
  - Mayor (2020–2026): Clotilde Correnoz
- Area^{1}: 11 km^{2} (4.2 sq mi)
- Highest elevation: 2,559 m (8,396 ft)
- Lowest elevation: 728 m (2,388 ft)
- Population (2023): 17
  - Density: 1.5/km^{2} (4.0/sq mi)
- Time zone: UTC+01:00 (CET)
  - Summer (DST): UTC+02:00 (CEST)
- INSEE/Postal code: 38286 /38520
- ^{1} French Land Register data, which excludes lakes, ponds, glaciers > 1 km^{2} (0.386 sq mi or 247 acres) and river estuaries.

Oulles (French pronunciation: [ul]) is a commune in the Isère department in southeastern France. It is at 1,400 metres (4,600 ft) on the Taillefer massif.

== Population ==
Historical population
Year	Pop.	±% p.a.
1968	29	—
1975	25	−2.10%
1982	8	−15.02%
1990	9	+1.48%
1999	16	+6.60%
2007	12	−3.53%
2012	12	+0.00%
2017	7	−10.22%
2023	17	+15.94%
Source: INSEE

== See also ==
- Communes of the Isère department
