= Besse, Isère =

Besse
- Commune
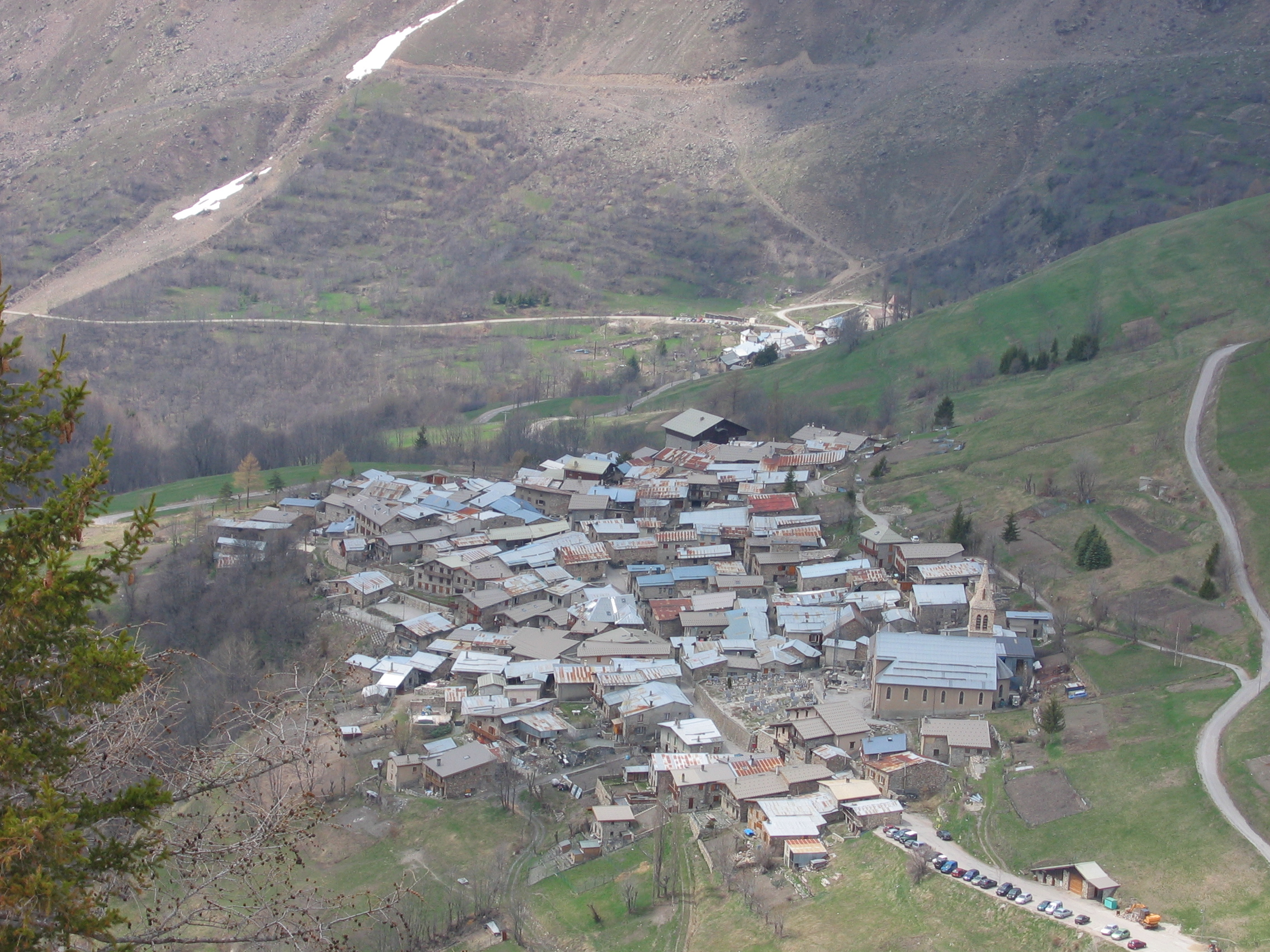
- A general view of Besse
- Location of Besse
- Location within France Location within Auvergne-Rhône-Alpes
- Coordinates: 45°04′21″N 6°10′15″E
- Country: France
- Region: Auvergne-Rhône-Alpes
- Department: Isère
- Arrondissement: Grenoble
- Canton: Oisans-Romanche

Government
  - Mayor (2020–2026): Jean-Rémy Ougier
- Area^{1}: 25 km^{2} (9.7 sq mi)
- Elevation: 1,450 m (4,760 ft)
- Highest elevation: 3,122 m (10,243 ft)
- Lowest elevation: 1,228 m (4,029 ft)
- Population (2023): 154
  - Density: 6.2/km^{2} (16/sq mi)
- Time zone: UTC+01:00 (CET)
  - Summer (DST): UTC+02:00 (CEST)
- INSEE/Postal code: 38040 /38142
- ^{1} French Land Register data, which excludes lakes, ponds, glaciers > 1 km^{2} (0.386 sq mi or 247 acres) and river estuaries.

Besse (French pronunciation: [bɛs]) is a commune in the Isère department in southeastern France.

== Population ==
Historical population
Year	Pop.	±% p.a.
1968	162	—
1975	116	−4.66%
1982	117	+0.12%
1990	116	−0.11%
1999	130	+1.27%
2007	142	+1.11%
2012	144	+0.28%
2017	126	−2.64%
2023	154	+3.40%
Source: INSEE

== See also ==
- Communes of the Isère department
