= Villard-Notre-Dame =

- Commune
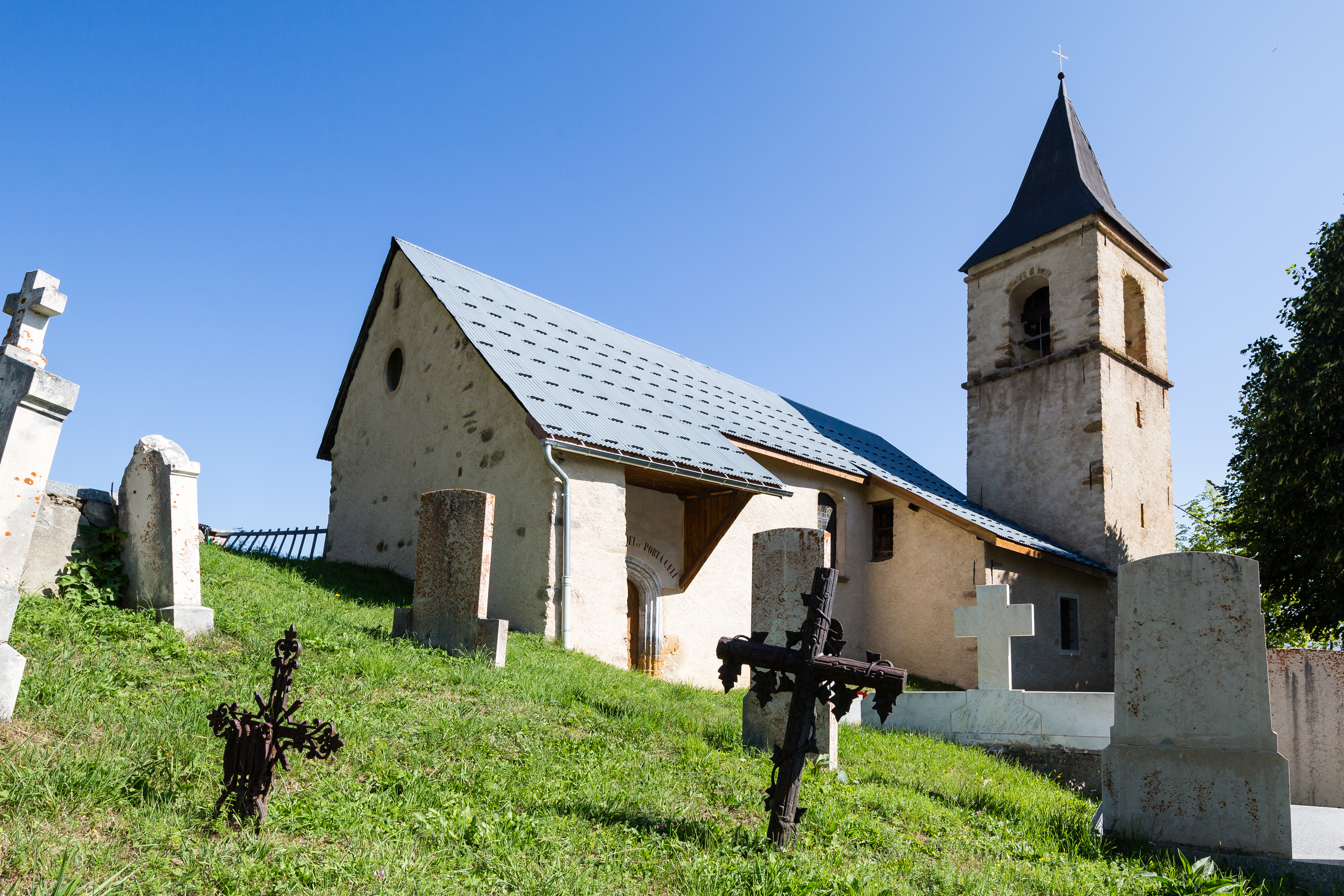
- The church of Notre-Dame de l'Assomption, in Villard-Notre-Dame
- Location of Villard-Notre-Dame
- Location within France Location within Auvergne-Rhône-Alpes
- Coordinates: 45°01′08″N 6°02′38″E
- Country: France
- Region: Auvergne-Rhône-Alpes
- Department: Isère
- Arrondissement: Grenoble
- Canton: Oisans-Romanche

Government
  - Mayor (2020–2026): Ophélie Brun
- Area^{1}: 14 km^{2} (5.4 sq mi)
- Elevation: 1,540 m (5,050 ft)
- Highest elevation: 3,023 m (9,918 ft)
- Lowest elevation: 720 m (2,360 ft)
- Population (2023): 25
  - Density: 1.8/km^{2} (4.6/sq mi)
- Time zone: UTC+01:00 (CET)
  - Summer (DST): UTC+02:00 (CEST)
- INSEE/Postal code: 38549 /38520
- ^{1} French Land Register data, which excludes lakes, ponds, glaciers > 1 km^{2} (0.386 sq mi or 247 acres) and river estuaries.

Villard-Notre-Dame (French pronunciation: [vilaʁ nɔtʁ dam]) is a commune in the Isère department in southeastern France.

== Population ==
Historical population
Year	Pop.	±% p.a.
1968	12	—
1975	28	+12.87%
1982	20	−4.69%
1990	26	+3.33%
1999	41	+5.19%
2007	31	−3.43%
2012	26	−3.46%
2017	27	+0.76%
2023	25	−1.27%
Source: INSEE

== See also ==
- Communes of the Isère department
