= La Garde, Isère =

La Garde
- Commune
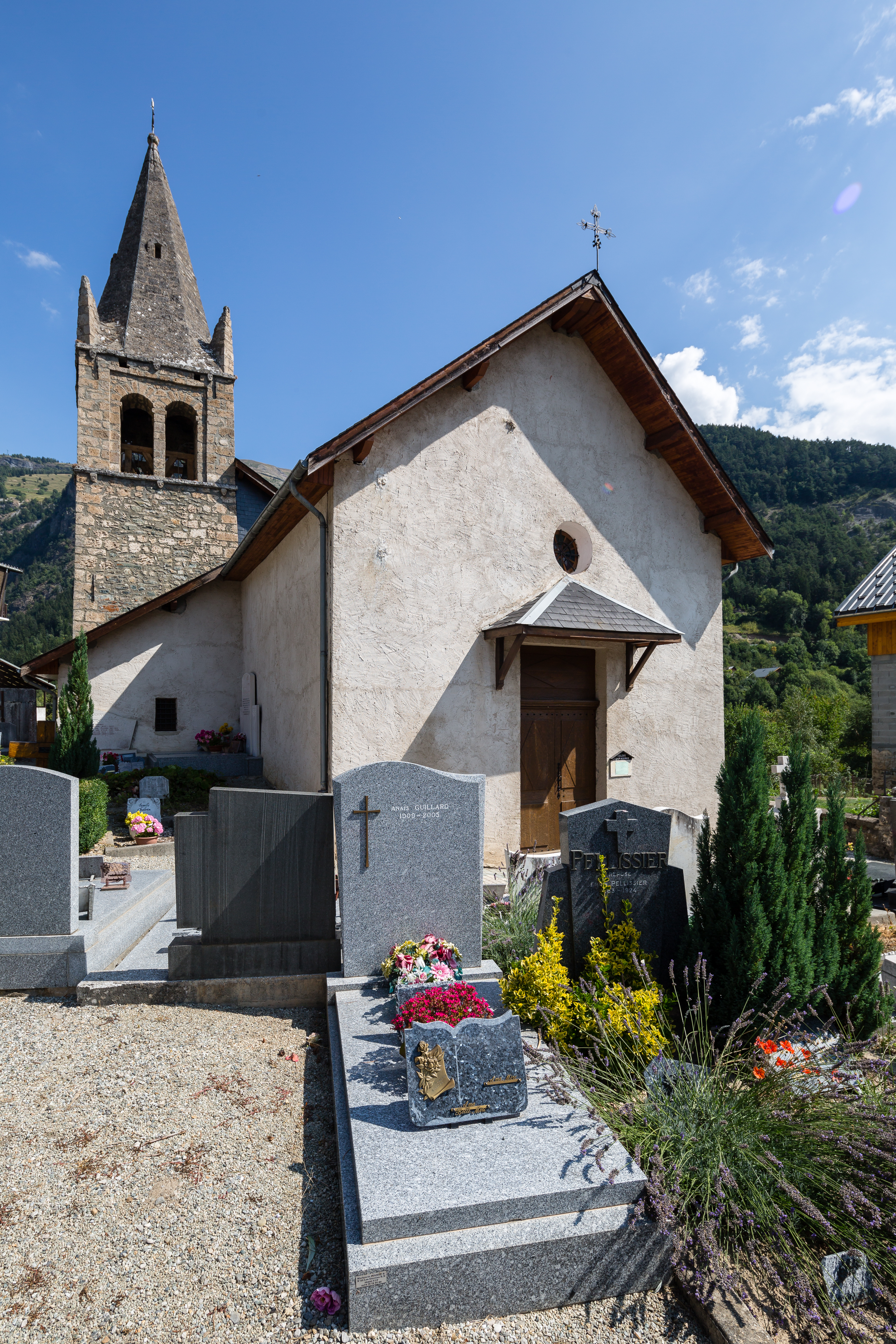
- The church of Saint-Pierre, in La Garde

- Coat of arms
- Location of La Garde
- Location within France Location within Auvergne-Rhône-Alpes
- Coordinates: 45°04′11″N 6°02′48″E
- Country: France
- Region: Auvergne-Rhône-Alpes
- Department: Isère
- Arrondissement: Grenoble
- Canton: Oisans-Romanche

Government
  - Mayor (2020–2026): Pierre Gandit
- Area^{1}: 9.09 km^{2} (3.51 sq mi)
- Elevation: 982 m (3,222 ft)
- Highest elevation: 1,859 m (6,099 ft)
- Lowest elevation: 715 m (2,346 ft)
- Population (2023): 100
  - Density: 11/km^{2} (28/sq mi)
- Time zone: UTC+01:00 (CET)
  - Summer (DST): UTC+02:00 (CEST)
- INSEE/Postal code: 38177 /38520
- ^{1} French Land Register data, which excludes lakes, ponds, glaciers > 1 km^{2} (0.386 sq mi or 247 acres) and river estuaries.

La Garde (French pronunciation: [la ɡaʁd]) is a commune in the Isère department in southeastern France.

== Population ==
Historical population
Year	Pop.	±% p.a.
1968	82	—
1975	72	−1.84%
1982	64	−1.67%
1990	52	−2.56%
1999	66	+2.68%
2007	100	+5.33%
2012	113	+2.47%
2017	98	−2.81%
2023	100	+0.34%
Source: INSEE

== See also ==
- Communes of the Isère department
