= Mizoën =

- Commune
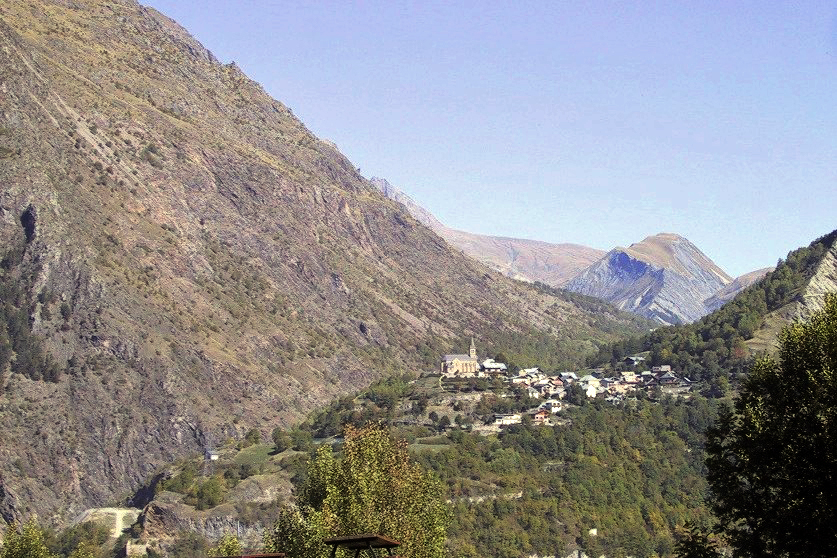
- A general view of Mizoën
- Location of Mizoën
- Location within France Location within Auvergne-Rhône-Alpes
- Coordinates: 45°03′04″N 6°08′35″E
- Country: France
- Region: Auvergne-Rhône-Alpes
- Department: Isère
- Arrondissement: Grenoble
- Canton: Oisans-Romanche

Government
  - Mayor (2020–2026): Bernard Michel
- Area^{1}: 14.6 km^{2} (5.6 sq mi)
- Highest elevation: 2,964 m (9,724 ft)
- Lowest elevation: 955 m (3,133 ft)
- Population (2023): 187
  - Density: 12.8/km^{2} (33.2/sq mi)
- Time zone: UTC+01:00 (CET)
  - Summer (DST): UTC+02:00 (CEST)
- INSEE/Postal code: 38237 /38142
- ^{1} French Land Register data, which excludes lakes, ponds, glaciers > 1 km^{2} (0.386 sq mi or 247 acres) and river estuaries.

Mizoën (French pronunciation: [mizwɛ̃]) is a commune in the Isère department in southeastern France.

== Population ==
Historical population
Year	Pop.	±% p.a.
1968	112	—
1975	90	−3.08%
1982	94	+0.62%
1990	122	+3.31%
1999	163	+3.27%
2007	176	+0.96%
2012	195	+2.07%
2017	191	−0.41%
2023	187	−0.35%
Source: INSEE

== See also ==
- Communes of the Isère department
