= Séchilienne =

- Commune
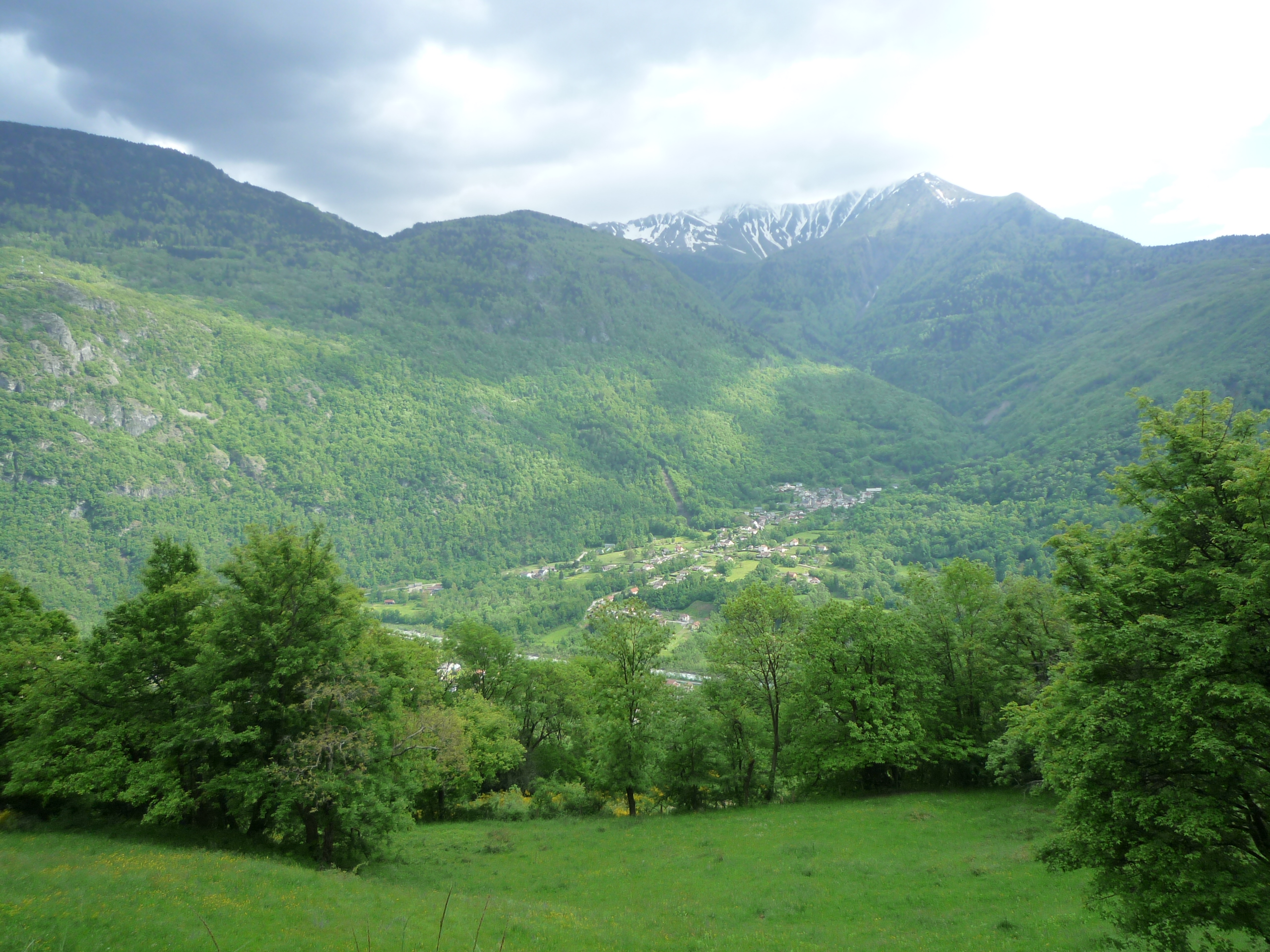
- A general view of Séchilienne
- Location of Séchilienne
- Location within France Location within Auvergne-Rhône-Alpes
- Coordinates: 45°03′15″N 5°50′05″E
- Country: France
- Region: Auvergne-Rhône-Alpes
- Department: Isère
- Arrondissement: Grenoble
- Canton: Oisans-Romanche
- Intercommunality: Grenoble-Alpes Métropole

Government
  - Mayor (2020–2026): Cyrille Plénet
- Area^{1}: 21.47 km^{2} (8.29 sq mi)
- Elevation: 364 m (1,194 ft)
- Highest elevation: 1,646 m (5,400 ft)
- Lowest elevation: 304 m (997 ft)
- Population (2023): 993
  - Density: 46.3/km^{2} (120/sq mi)
- Time zone: UTC+01:00 (CET)
  - Summer (DST): UTC+02:00 (CEST)
- INSEE/Postal code: 38478 /38220
- ^{1} French Land Register data, which excludes lakes, ponds, glaciers > 1 km^{2} (0.386 sq mi or 247 acres) and river estuaries.

Séchilienne (French pronunciation: [seʃiljɛn]; Arpitan: Cèchelina) is a commune in the Isère department in southeastern France.

== Population ==
Historical population
Year	Pop.	±% p.a.
1968	548	—
1975	474	−2.05%
1982	641	+4.41%
1990	673	+0.61%
1999	760	+1.36%
2007	870	+1.70%
2012	963	+2.05%
2017	1,052	+1.78%
2023	993	−0.96%
Source: INSEE

== See also ==
- Communes of the Isère department
