= La Morte =

- Commune
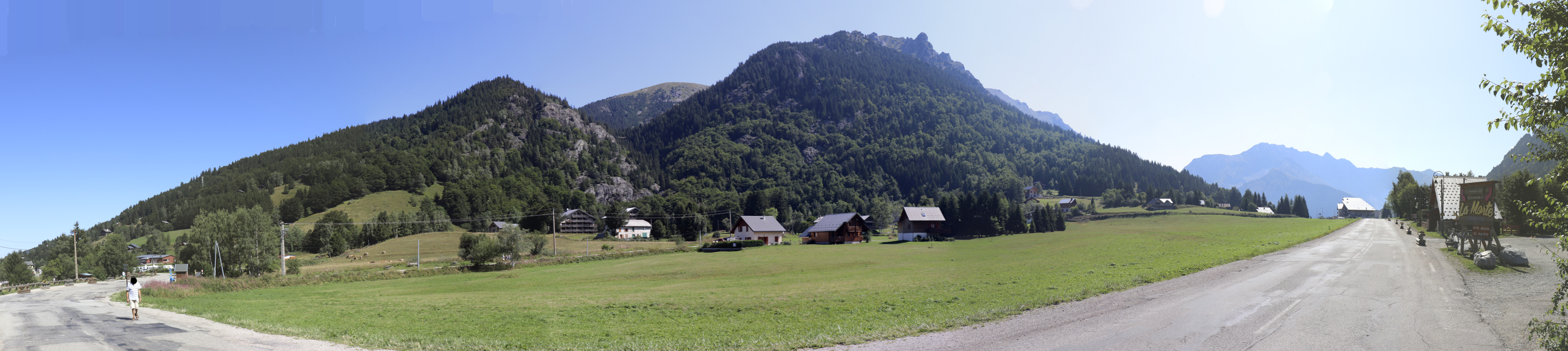
- Panorama view from the centre of the town
- Location of La Morte
- Location within France Location within Auvergne-Rhône-Alpes
- Coordinates: 45°01′50″N 5°51′24″E
- Country: France
- Region: Auvergne-Rhône-Alpes
- Department: Isère
- Arrondissement: Grenoble
- Canton: Oisans-Romanche

Government
  - Mayor (2020–2026): Raymond Maslo
- Area^{1}: 19.45 km^{2} (7.51 sq mi)
- Highest elevation: 2,653 m (8,704 ft)
- Lowest elevation: 1,063 m (3,488 ft)
- Population (2023): 143
  - Density: 7.35/km^{2} (19.0/sq mi)
- Time zone: UTC+01:00 (CET)
  - Summer (DST): UTC+02:00 (CEST)
- INSEE/Postal code: 38264 /38350
- ^{1} French Land Register data, which excludes lakes, ponds, glaciers > 1 km^{2} (0.386 sq mi or 247 acres) and river estuaries.

La Morte (French pronunciation: [la mɔʁt]) is a commune in the Isère department in southeastern France.

== Population ==
Historical population
Year	Pop.	±% p.a.
1968	67	—
1975	69	+0.42%
1982	120	+8.23%
1990	142	+2.13%
1999	130	−0.98%
2007	140	+0.93%
2012	149	+1.25%
2017	132	−2.39%
2023	143	+1.34%
Source: INSEE

== See also ==
- Communes of the Isère department
