= Le Freney-d'Oisans =

- Commune
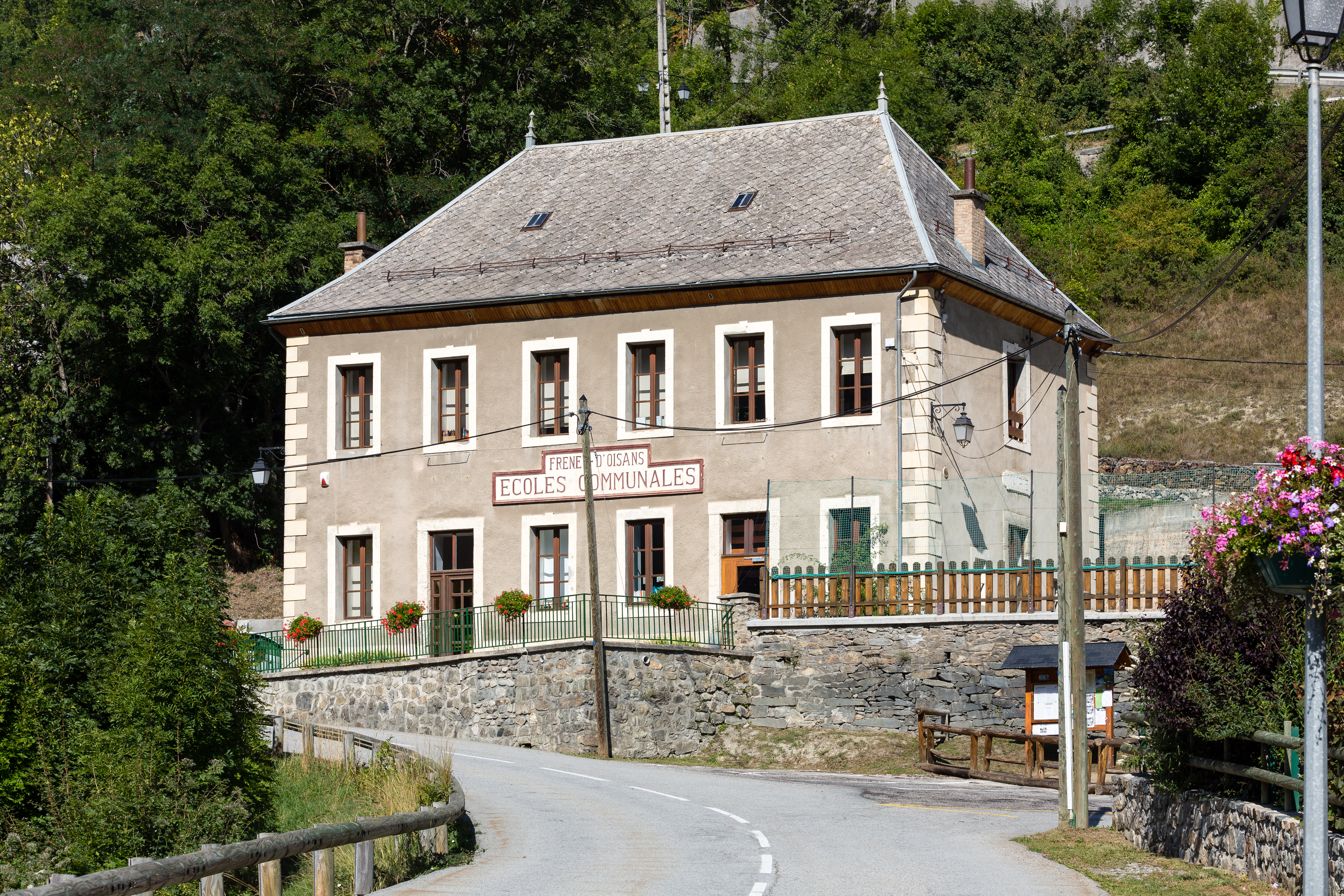
- Town hall and school
- Location of Le Freney-d'Oisans
- Location within France Location within Auvergne-Rhône-Alpes
- Coordinates: 45°02′45″N 6°07′35″E
- Country: France
- Region: Auvergne-Rhône-Alpes
- Department: Isère
- Arrondissement: Grenoble
- Canton: Oisans-Romanche

Government
  - Mayor (2020–2026): Christian Pichoud
- Area^{1}: 14.5 km^{2} (5.6 sq mi)
- Elevation: 927 m (3,041 ft)
- Highest elevation: 3,445 m (11,302 ft)
- Lowest elevation: 871 m (2,858 ft)
- Population (2023): 260
  - Density: 18/km^{2} (46/sq mi)
- Time zone: UTC+01:00 (CET)
  - Summer (DST): UTC+02:00 (CEST)
- INSEE/Postal code: 38173 /38142
- ^{1} French Land Register data, which excludes lakes, ponds, glaciers > 1 km^{2} (0.386 sq mi or 247 acres) and river estuaries.

Le Freney-d'Oisans (French pronunciation: [lə fʁənɛ dwazɑ̃]) is a commune in the Isère department in southeastern France.

== Population ==
Historical population
Year	Pop.	±% p.a.
1968	154	—
1975	133	−2.07%
1982	180	+4.42%
1990	177	−0.21%
1999	221	+2.50%
2007	277	+2.86%
2012	252	−1.87%
2017	252	+0.00%
2023	260	+0.52%
Source: INSEE

== See also ==
- Communes of the Isère department
