= Vaulnaveys-le-Haut =

- Commune
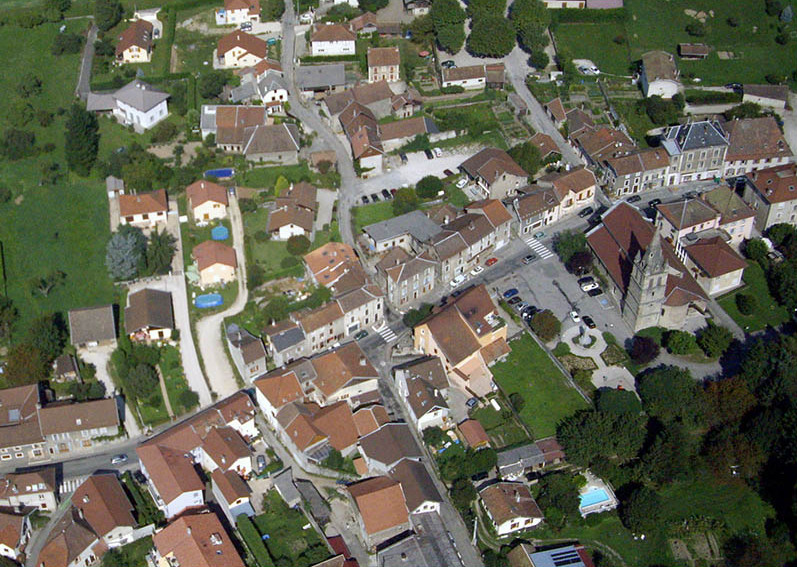
- An aerial view of Vaulnaveys-le-Haut
- Location of Vaulnaveys-le-Haut
- Location within France Location within Auvergne-Rhône-Alpes
- Coordinates: 45°07′10″N 5°48′40″E
- Country: France
- Region: Auvergne-Rhône-Alpes
- Department: Isère
- Arrondissement: Grenoble
- Canton: Oisans-Romanche
- Intercommunality: Grenoble-Alpes Métropole

Government
  - Mayor (2020–2026): Jean-Yves Porta
- Area^{1}: 19.86 km^{2} (7.67 sq mi)
- Elevation: 365 m (1,198 ft)
- Highest elevation: 1,714 m (5,623 ft)
- Lowest elevation: 338 m (1,109 ft)
- Population (2023): 4,006
  - Density: 201.7/km^{2} (522.4/sq mi)
- Time zone: UTC+01:00 (CET)
  - Summer (DST): UTC+02:00 (CEST)
- INSEE/Postal code: 38529 /38410
- ^{1} French Land Register data, which excludes lakes, ponds, glaciers > 1 km^{2} (0.386 sq mi or 247 acres) and river estuaries.

Vaulnaveys-le-Haut (French pronunciation: [volnavɛ lə o]; Arpitan: Vâlnavês-d’Amont) is a commune in the Isère department in southeastern France.

== Population ==
Historical population

Year	Pop.	±% p.a.
1793	1,113	—
1821	1,602	+1.31%
1846	1,667	+0.16%
1872	1,653	−0.03%
1901	1,533	−0.26%
1926	1,141	−1.17%
1946	1,298	+0.65%
1962	1,263	−0.17%
1968	1,813	+6.21%

Year	Pop.	±% p.a.
1975	1,564	−2.09%
1982	2,058	+4.00%
1990	2,666	+3.29%
1999	3,096	+1.68%
2007	3,367	+1.05%
2012	3,635	+1.54%
2017	3,867	+1.25%
2023	4,006	+0.59%

Source: EHESS and INSEE (1990-2023)

== See also ==
- Communes of the Isère department
