= Saint-Martin-d'Uriage =

- Commune
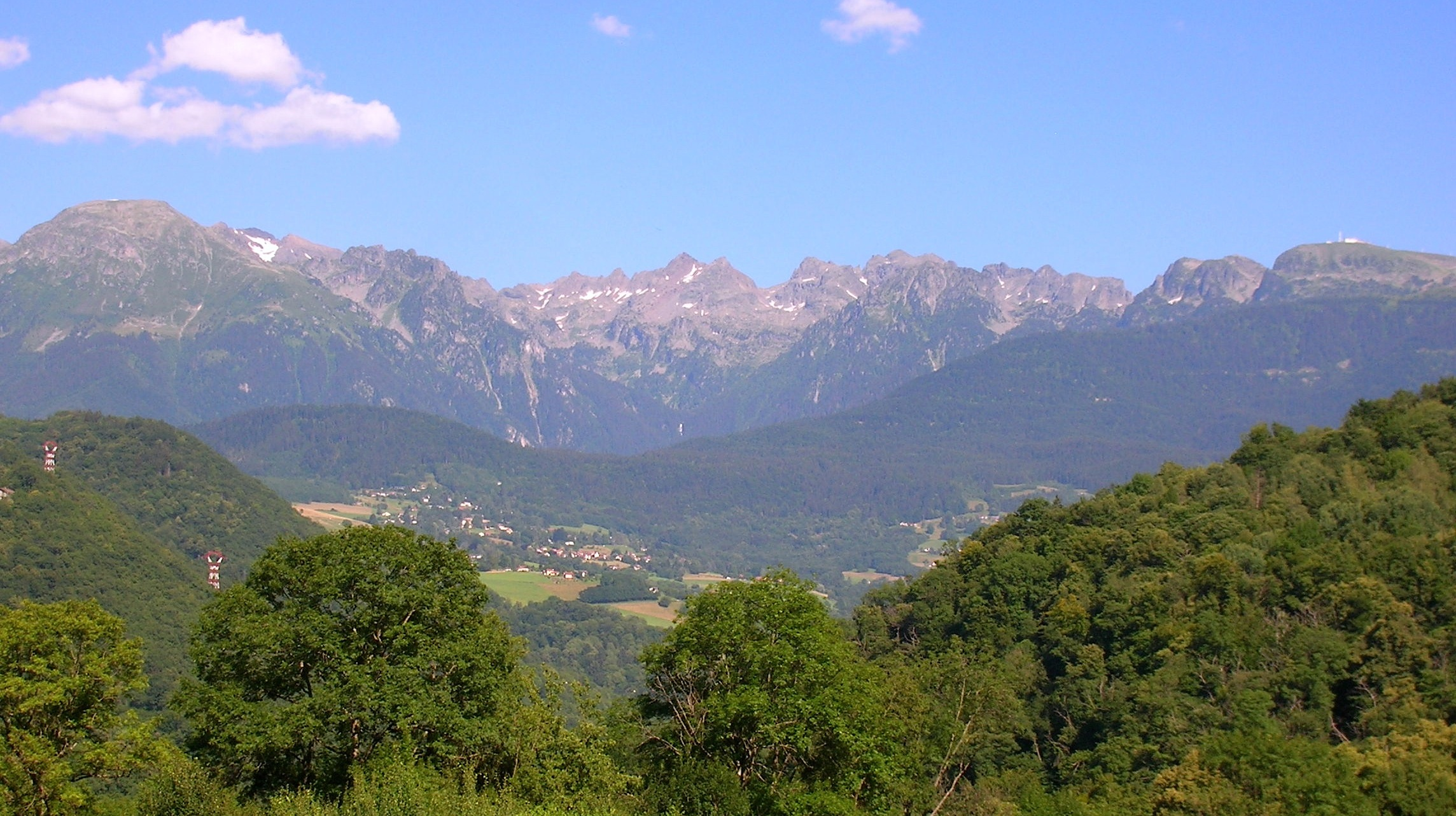
- A general view of Saint-Martin-d'Uriage

- Coat of arms
- Location of Saint-Martin-d'Uriage
- Location within France Location within Auvergne-Rhône-Alpes
- Coordinates: 45°09′08″N 5°50′21″E
- Country: France
- Region: Auvergne-Rhône-Alpes
- Department: Isère
- Arrondissement: Grenoble
- Canton: Oisans-Romanche
- Intercommunality: CC Le Grésivaudan

Government
  - Mayor (2020–2026): Gérald Giraud
- Area^{1}: 29.69 km^{2} (11.46 sq mi)
- Highest elevation: 2,200 m (7,200 ft)
- Lowest elevation: 320 m (1,050 ft)
- Population (2023): 5,587
  - Density: 188.2/km^{2} (487.4/sq mi)
- Time zone: UTC+01:00 (CET)
  - Summer (DST): UTC+02:00 (CEST)
- INSEE/Postal code: 38422 /38410
- ^{1} French Land Register data, which excludes lakes, ponds, glaciers > 1 km^{2} (0.386 sq mi or 247 acres) and river estuaries.

Saint-Martin-d'Uriage (French pronunciation: [sɛ̃ maʁtɛ̃ dyʁjaʒ]) is a commune in the Isère department located in the French Alps, in southeastern France. The nearest major city is Grenoble.

== Population ==
Historical population

Year	Pop.	±% p.a.
1793	1,916	—
1800	1,893	−0.17%
1806	1,896	+0.03%
1821	2,171	+0.91%
1831	2,454	+1.23%
1836	2,380	−0.61%
1841	2,591	+1.71%
1846	2,600	+0.07%
1851	2,400	−1.59%
1856	2,435	+0.29%
1861	2,234	−1.71%
1866	2,252	+0.16%
1872	2,253	+0.01%
1876	2,139	−1.29%
1881	2,165	+0.24%
1886	2,211	+0.42%
1891	2,023	−1.76%
1896	1,917	−1.07%
1901	1,784	−1.43%

Year	Pop.	±% p.a.
1906	1,661	−1.42%
1911	1,630	−0.38%
1921	1,407	−1.46%
1926	1,374	−0.47%
1931	1,314	−0.89%
1936	1,253	−0.95%
1946	1,293	+0.31%
1954	1,659	+3.16%
1962	1,354	−2.51%
1968	1,511	+1.85%
1975	1,815	+2.65%
1982	2,527	+4.84%
1990	3,678	+4.80%
1999	4,794	+2.99%
2007	5,234	+1.10%
2012	5,440	+0.78%
2017	5,451	+0.04%
2023	5,587	+0.41%

Source: EHESS and INSEE (1968-2023)

== See also ==
- Communes of the Isère department
