= Grenoble metropolitan area =

Urban area of Grenoble

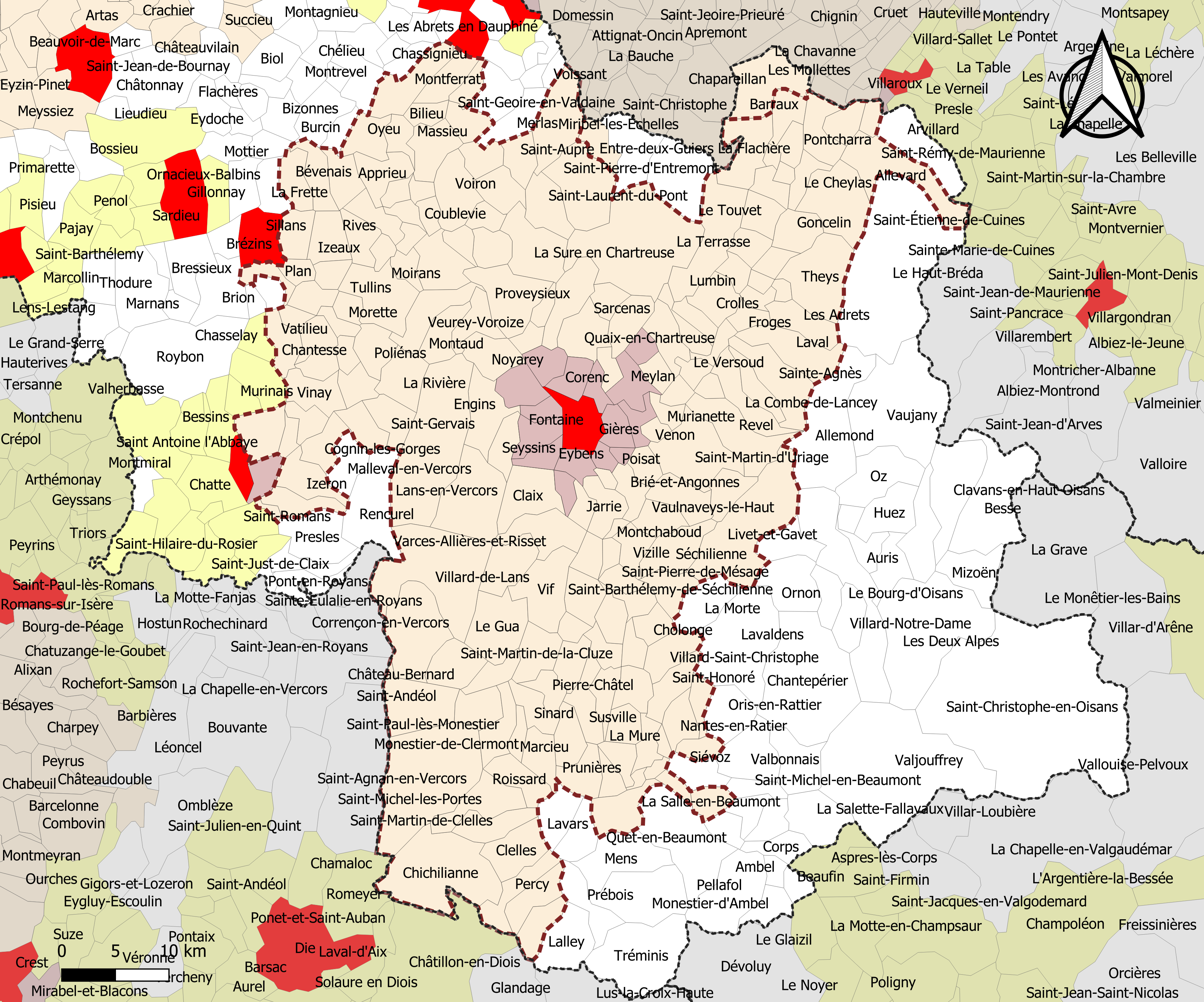
Map showing the extent of the Grenoble metropolitan area as of 2020. Central commune Primary urban cluster Peripheral commune Peripheral commune of a functional area with less than 200,000 inhabitants

Grenoble metropolitan area (French: aire d'attraction de Grenoble) as defined by INSEE in 2020 is the functional urban area of the city of Grenoble, southeastern France. It covers 204 communes, all in the Isère department. It has 714,799 inhabitants (2018) in an area of 2,876 km^{2} (1,110 sq mi), which is 39% of the Isère department. Grenoble and 15 other communes form the pôle urbain or urban cluster, the other 188 communes form the couronne or commuter belt. The most populous communes in the functional area are Grenoble, Échirolles, Fontaine, Meylan, Le Pont-de-Claix, Saint-Égrève, Saint-Martin-d'Hères, Sassenage, Seyssinet-Pariset and Voiron, all except Voiron part of the pôle urbain. It is the 11th-most populous functional urban area in France.

== Communes ==
The communes of the functional area of Grenoble are:

- Les Adrets
- L'Albenc
- Allevard
- Apprieu
- Autrans-Méaudre-en-Vercors
- Avignonet
- Barraux
- Beaucroissant
- Beaulieu
- Beauvoir-en-Royans
- Bernin
- Bévenais
- Bilieu
- Biviers
- Bresson
- Brié-et-Angonnes
- La Buisse
- La Buissière
- Champagnier
- Le Champ-près-Froges
- Champ-sur-Drac
- Chamrousse
- Chantesse
- Charavines
- Charnècles
- Château-Bernard
- Le Cheylas
- Chichilianne
- Chirens
- Cholonge
- Claix
- Clelles
- Cognet
- Cognin-les-Gorges
- Colombe
- La Combe-de-Lancey
- Corenc
- Corrençon-en-Vercors
- Coublevie
- Cras
- Crêts-en-Belledonne
- Crolles
- Domène
- Échirolles
- Engins
- Eybens
- La Flachère
- Fontaine
- Fontanil-Cornillon
- La Forteresse
- Froges
- Gières
- Goncelin
- Le Grand-Lemps
- Grenoble
- Gresse-en-Vercors
- Le Gua
- Herbeys
- Hurtières
- Izeaux
- Izeron
- Jarrie
- Laffrey
- Lans-en-Vercors
- Laval-en-Belledonne
- Livet-et-Gavet
- Lumbin
- Marcieu
- Massieu
- Mayres-Savel
- Meylan
- Miribel-Lanchâtre
- Miribel-les-Échelles
- Moirans
- Monestier-de-Clermont
- Le Monestier-du-Percy
- Montaud
- Montbonnot-Saint-Martin
- Montchaboud
- Monteynard
- Montferrat
- Mont-Saint-Martin
- Morette
- La Motte-d'Aveillans
- La Motte-Saint-Martin
- Le Moutaret
- La Mure
- La Murette
- Murianette
- Nantes-en-Ratier
- Serre-Nerpol
- Notre-Dame-de-Commiers
- Notre-Dame-de-l'Osier
- Notre-Dame-de-Mésage
- Notre-Dame-de-Vaulx
- Noyarey
- Oyeu
- Villages du Lac de Paladru
- Percy
- La Pierre
- Pierre-Châtel
- Plan
- Plateau-des-Petites-Roches
- Poisat
- Poliénas
- Ponsonnas
- Pontcharra
- Le Pont-de-Claix
- Proveysieux
- Prunières
- Quaix-en-Chartreuse
- Quincieu
- Réaumont
- Renage
- Revel
- Rives
- La Rivière
- Roissard
- Rovon
- Sainte-Agnès
- Saint-Andéol
- Saint-Arey
- Saint-Aupre
- Saint-Barthélemy-de-Séchilienne
- Saint-Blaise-du-Buis
- Saint-Cassien
- Saint-Égrève
- Saint-Étienne-de-Crossey
- Saint-Geoirs
- Saint-Georges-de-Commiers
- Saint-Gervais
- Saint-Guillaume
- Saint-Honoré
- Saint-Ismier
- Saint-Jean-de-Moirans
- Saint-Jean-de-Vaulx
- Saint-Jean-d'Hérans
- Saint-Jean-le-Vieux
- Saint-Joseph-de-Rivière
- Saint-Laurent-du-Pont
- Sainte-Marie-d'Alloix
- Sainte-Marie-du-Mont
- Saint-Martin-de-Clelles
- Saint-Martin-de-la-Cluze
- Saint-Martin-d'Hères
- Saint-Martin-d'Uriage
- Saint-Martin-le-Vinoux
- Saint-Maurice-en-Trièves
- Saint-Maximin
- Saint-Michel-les-Portes
- Saint-Mury-Monteymond
- Saint-Nazaire-les-Eymes
- Saint-Nicolas-de-Macherin
- Saint-Nizier-du-Moucherotte
- Saint-Paul-de-Varces
- Saint-Paul-d'Izeaux
- Saint-Paul-lès-Monestier
- Saint-Pierre-de-Chartreuse
- Saint-Pierre-de-Chérennes
- Saint-Pierre-de-Méaroz
- Saint-Pierre-de-Mésage
- Saint-Quentin-sur-Isère
- Saint-Sulpice-des-Rivoires
- Saint-Théoffrey
- Saint-Vérand
- Saint-Vincent-de-Mercuze
- La Salle-en-Beaumont
- Le Sappey-en-Chartreuse
- Sarcenas
- Sassenage
- Séchilienne
- Seyssinet-Pariset
- Seyssins
- Siévoz
- Sillans
- Sinard
- Sousville
- La Sure en Chartreuse
- Susville
- Têche
- Tencin
- La Terrasse
- Theys
- Le Touvet
- Treffort
- La Tronche
- Tullins
- La Valette
- Varces-Allières-et-Risset
- Vatilieu
- Vaulnaveys-le-Bas
- Vaulnaveys-le-Haut
- Venon
- Le Versoud
- Veurey-Voroize
- Vif
- Villard-Bonnot
- Villard-de-Lans
- Villard-Saint-Christophe
- Vinay
- Vizille
- Voiron
- Voreppe
- Vourey

== Organisation ==
This statistic-based metropolitan area is divided into multiple administrative divisions. Among them are:

- Métropole of Grenoble-Alpes Métropole,
- Agglomeration community of Pays Voironnais,
- Communauté de communes du Pays du Grésivaudan,
- Communauté de communes du Sud Grenoblois,
- Communauté de communes du Masif du Vercors

== See also ==
- Grenoble urban unit
