= Saint-Mury-Monteymond =

- Commune
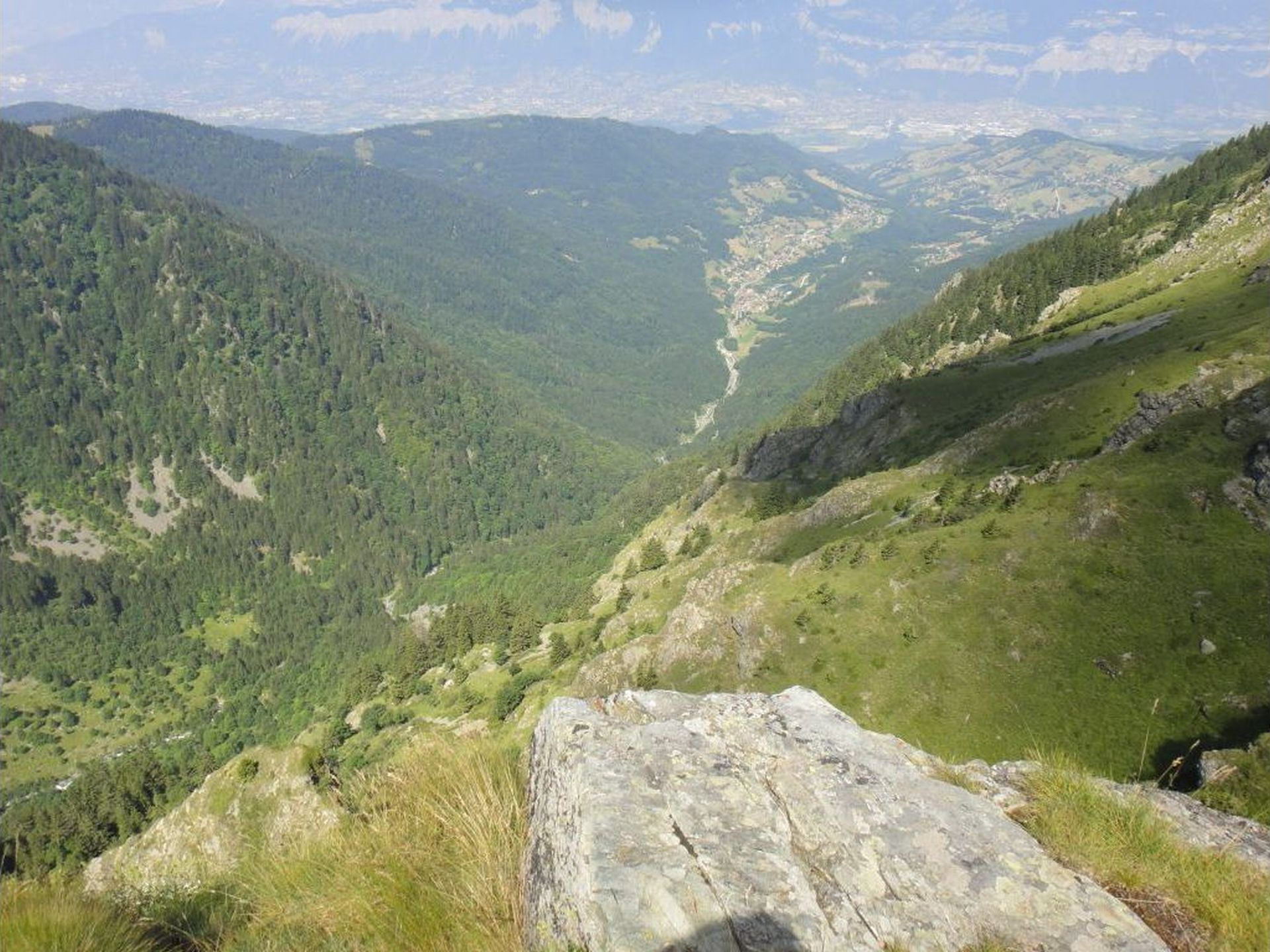
- Saint Mury-Monteymond seen from Refuge Jean Collet
- Location of Saint-Mury-Monteymond
- Location within France Location within Auvergne-Rhône-Alpes
- Coordinates: 45°13′23″N 5°55′38″E
- Country: France
- Region: Auvergne-Rhône-Alpes
- Department: Isère
- Arrondissement: Grenoble
- Canton: Le Moyen Grésivaudan
- Intercommunality: CC Le Grésivaudan

Government
  - Mayor (2020–2026): Isabelle Curt
- Area^{1}: 11 km^{2} (4.2 sq mi)
- Highest elevation: 2,600 m (8,500 ft)
- Lowest elevation: 320 m (1,050 ft)
- Population (2023): 342
  - Density: 31/km^{2} (81/sq mi)
- Time zone: UTC+01:00 (CET)
  - Summer (DST): UTC+02:00 (CEST)
- INSEE/Postal code: 38430 /38190
- ^{1} French Land Register data, which excludes lakes, ponds, glaciers > 1 km^{2} (0.386 sq mi or 247 acres) and river estuaries.

Saint-Mury-Monteymond (French pronunciation: [sɛ̃ myʁi mɔ̃temɔ̃]) is a commune in the Isère department in the region Auvergne-Rhône-Alpes of France.

== History ==
In 1882, Aristide Bergès constructed a 1200 hp turbine in the neighbouring hamlet of La Gorge, at the foot of the Peak of Belledonne.

Due to the steepness of the slope to the Lac Blanc, source of the river Vors, the first Penstocks were constructed. Because of the work of Aristide Bergès, Saint-Mury-Monteymond became the first village in France illuminated by electrical power.

== Geography ==
Neighbouring communes are:

- Sainte-Agnès,
- La Combe-de-Lancey,
- Laval,
- Villard-Bonnot,
- Saint-Jean-le-Vieux.

== Population ==
Historical population
Year	Pop.	±% p.a.
1968	150	—
1975	150	+0.00%
1982	193	+3.67%
1990	259	+3.75%
1999	314	+2.16%
2007	343	+1.11%
2012	342	−0.06%
2017	320	−1.32%
2023	342	+1.11%
Source: INSEE

== Sights ==
- Ancient millhouse

== See also ==
- List of Communes of the Isère Department
