= Jean Rosset =

French sculptor (1937–2021)

- Born: Jean Rosset-Boulon; 31 October 1937; Sainte-Agnès, France
- Died: 3 December 2021 (aged 84)
- Occupation: Sculptor

Signature
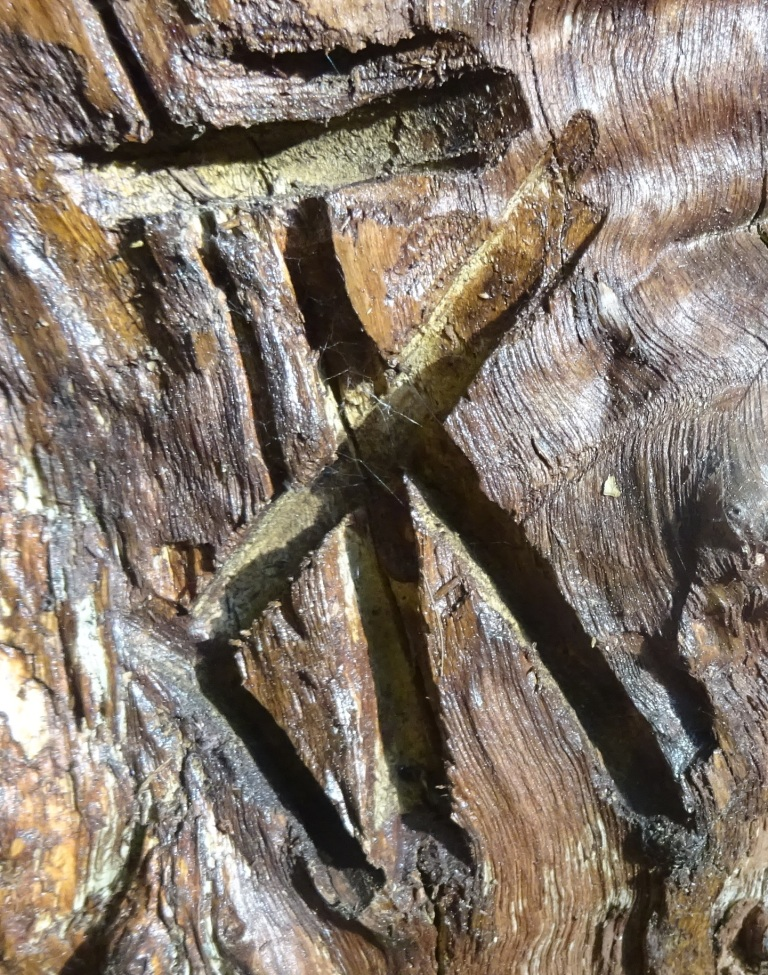

Jean Rosset (31 October 1937 – 3 December 2021) was a French sculptor.

== Biography ==
Rosset was born into a modest, agricultural family and entered the workforce at age 14. In 1962, he took drawing and painting classes and was introduced to the carving knife, which he used in his sculptures.

From 19 January to 5 March 1978, he took part in the exhibition "Les Singuliers de l'art" at the Musée d'Art Moderne de Paris. In 1985, he was present at the festival "Octobre des arts" at Lyon–Saint-Exupéry Airport. In 2003, he exhibited "Têtes de bois, sculptures de Jean Rosset" at the International Shoe Museum. He took part in the "Biennale hors normes" three times: in 2007 at the Piscine du Rhône, in 2015 at Lumière University Lyon 2, and in 2017 at Mont Cindre. In 2012 and 2013, he participated in the festival "Hors les normes" in Praz-sur-Arly. In 2019, he exhibited at "Le bois", organized by the Galerie Alphonse Chave in Vence and in La Buissière. In 2020, he exhibited six of his works along hiking trails in the Belledonne mountain range. In June and July 2021, he held an exhibition at the Espace Aragon in Villard-Bonnot, organized by the Communauté de communes Le Grésivaudan.

The primary material for his sculptures was wood obtained from fallen trees, primarily elm, chestnut, oak, and ash. He also used polychrome and produced biodegradable outdoor sculptures. He carved his works typically with knives and chainsaws, giving the characters mouths and facial expressions. Jeanine Rivais of the Syndicat de la Critique Parisienne described Rosset as "a talented artist whose work extends and enriches the natural balance of the earth".

Rosset died on 3 December 2021, at the age of 84.

== Public collections ==
- Institut d'art contemporain de Villeurbanne
- Musée d'art contemporain de Lyon
- Musée de la Création Franche
- Department of Aude
- Commune of Saint-Quentin-Fallavier
- Commune of Charny-Orée-de-Puisaye
