= Biviers =

- Commune
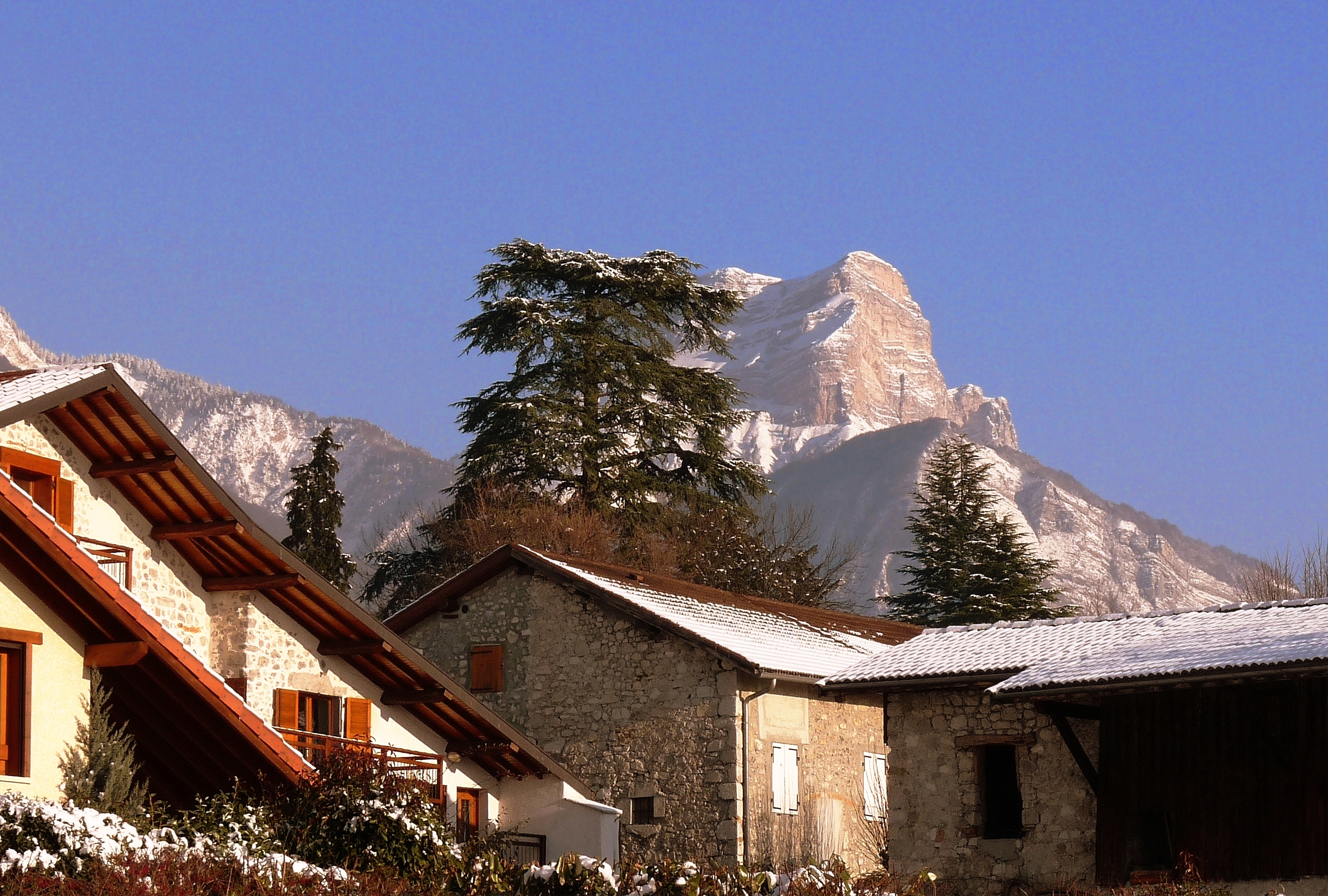
- Biviers houses with Dent de Crolles in the background, 2009

- Coat of arms
- Location of Biviers
- Location within France Location within Auvergne-Rhône-Alpes
- Coordinates: 45°14′25″N 5°48′14″E
- Country: France
- Region: Auvergne-Rhône-Alpes
- Department: Isère
- Arrondissement: Grenoble
- Canton: Meylan
- Intercommunality: CC Le Grésivaudan

Government
  - Mayor (2020–2026): Thierry Ferotin
- Area^{1}: 6.17 km^{2} (2.38 sq mi)
- Elevation: 417 m (1,368 ft)
- Highest elevation: 1,388 m (4,554 ft)
- Lowest elevation: 311 m (1,020 ft)
- Population (2023): 2,377
  - Density: 385/km^{2} (998/sq mi)
- Time zone: UTC+01:00 (CET)
  - Summer (DST): UTC+02:00 (CEST)
- INSEE/Postal code: 38045 /38330
- ^{1} French Land Register data, which excludes lakes, ponds, glaciers > 1 km^{2} (0.386 sq mi or 247 acres) and river estuaries.

Biviers (French pronunciation: [bivje]) is a commune in the Isère département in southeastern France.

== Geography ==
Biviers lies 10 km (6.2 mi) northeast of Grenoble on the D1090 road, at the foot of Mount Saint-Eynard, on a limestone scree located on the east side of the Chartreuse Mountains. It is part of the Grenoble urban unit (agglomeration).

Towards the southwest, Biviers faces the Belledonne range, in the Grésivaudan section of the Isère valley. On the northwest, the village leans against a 450 metres (1,476 ft) tall limestone cliff above the scree. The cliff is subject to constant erosion, and rock slides are frequent during the summer, with great noise and much dust.

Mont Blanc can be seen from many places in the village and is only 105 kilometres (65 mi) in line of sight.

Biviers can be subdivided into three main sectors:

- The upper part is a cliff starting from an elevation of 900 metres (2,953 ft) and culminating at 1,358 metres (4,455 ft).
- The middle section – between 500 metres (1,640 ft) and 900 metres (2,953 ft) – is a forest and is a favorite destination of hikers. The slope is steep and averages 20%. This section is sparsely populated.
- The lower section sits on flatter ground and is where most inhabitants live, the lowest point of the village being at 311 metres (1,020 ft).

== Administration ==
The current mayor of Biviers is Thierry Ferotin, elected in 2020.

Biviers is a member of the intercommunality Communauté de communes Le Grésivaudan as of 2024.

== Population ==
The inhabitants of Biviers are known in French as French: Biviérois (pronounced [ˈbivjeʁwa]).

Historical population
Year	Pop.	±% p.a.
1968	964	—
1975	1,733	+8.74%
1982	2,147	+3.11%
1990	2,258	+0.63%
1999	2,383	+0.60%
2007	2,344	−0.21%
2012	2,325	−0.16%
2017	2,386	+0.52%
2023	2,377	−0.06%
Source: INSEE

== Places, monuments and curiosities ==
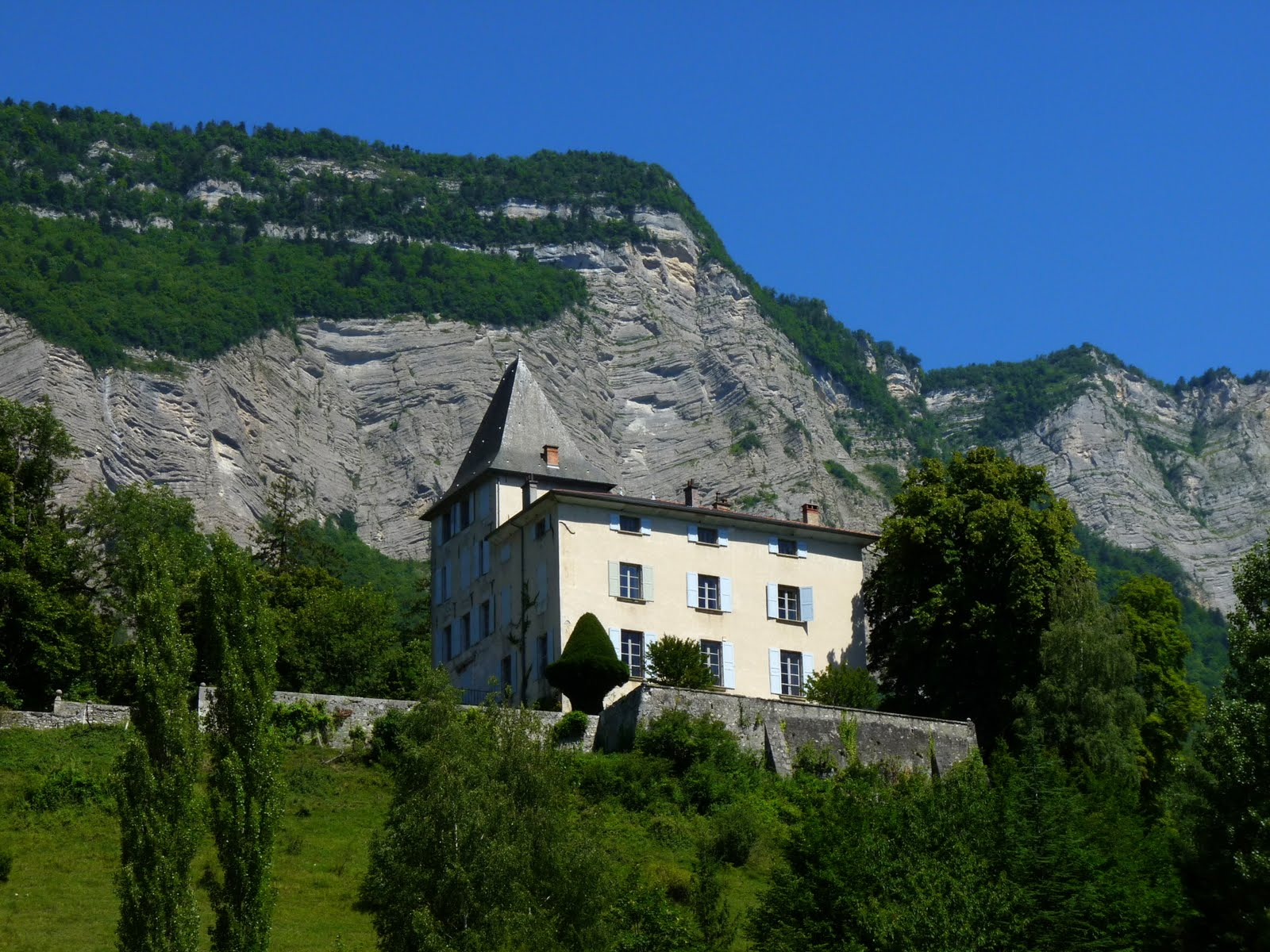
Chateau de Montbives in Biviers

Montbives is a fortified house, built during the 14th century and sitting just below the middle section of the village. It boasts a massive square tower and an impressive kitchen with carved stone pillars.

The château de Serviantin dates back from the 15th century. The name stems from Abel Servien who was born there in 1593 and who later served as a minister for Louis XIII. Its square tower can be seen from chemin de la Grivelière and is a classified historical monument.

The château de Franquières is more recent and dates back from the 17th century. It was built between 1601 and 1610 by the Aymon de Franquières family. During the French Revolution, the property belonged to the scientist Laurent-Aymon de Franquières who was elected as the first revolutionary mayor of Grenoble in February 1790 but who knew he was seriously ill and thus resigned in favor of Joseph Marie de Barral. When he died the same year, the property went to Anne-Marie Franquières – most probably his sister – and then to the related McCarthy family in 1809 who renovated it in 1836. In 1852 it moved to Baroness of Vignet, then Charles de Vignet who sold it in 1880 to Félix du Bourg whose family owned it until 1924 when it was sold to the Forest-Colcombet. Finally, it was bought in 1959 by the OVE (Oeuvre des Villages d'Enfants).

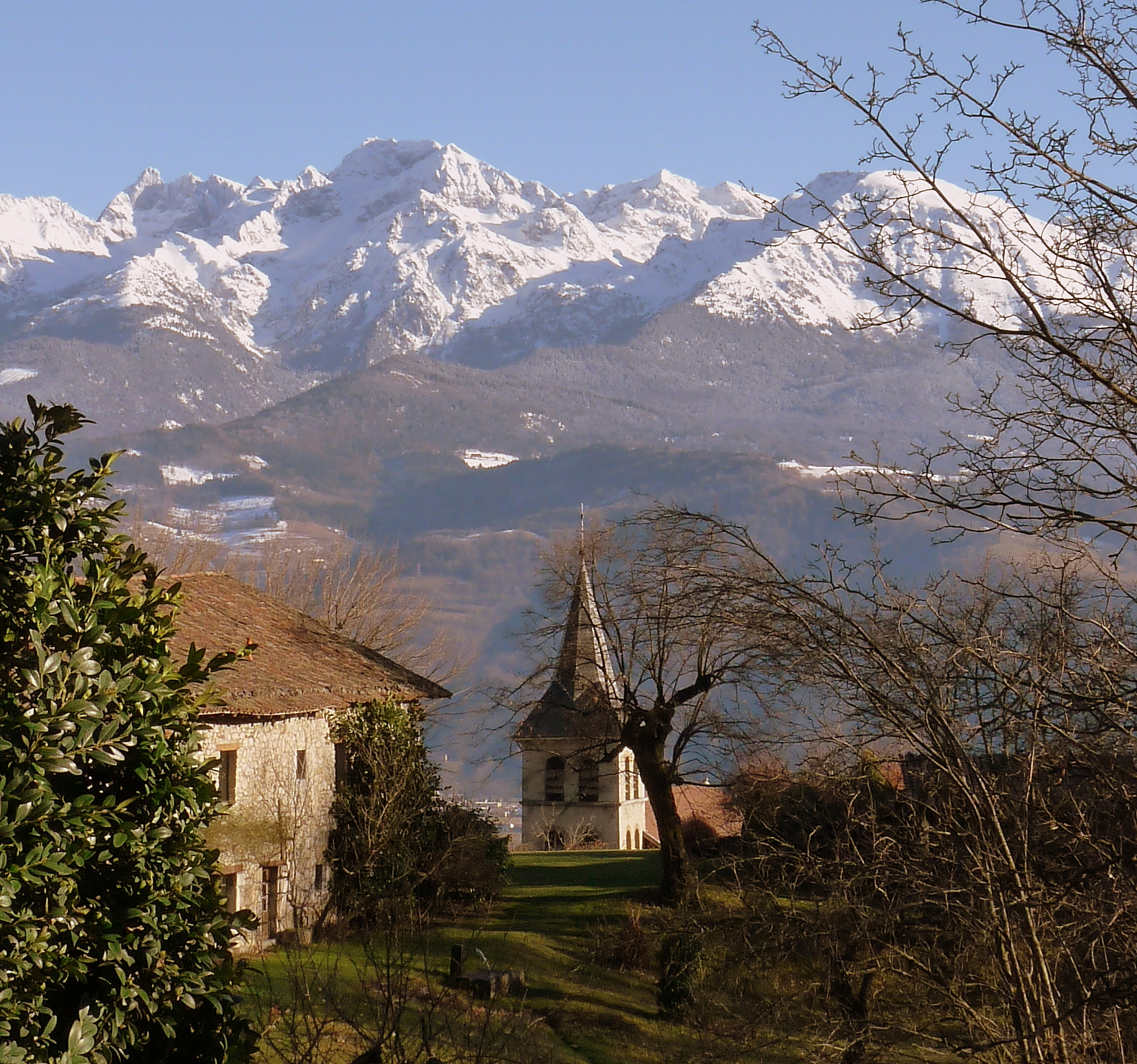
Church of Biviers

The church of Biviers was probably built around 1500. Shortly after the French Revolution it was seriously damaged by a violent storm which destroyed its roof, its stained glass windows and even some furniture. It remained unused from 1794 to 1805, but then was significantly modified: it was repaired in 1822, its choir was elevated in 1829, so was its tower in 1845 and its nave in 1873. New bells were acquired in 1883 and placed in a new tower, while the choir was rebuilt in 1885.

The water system that feeds Biviers does not tap water from the Chartreuse limestone mountains where the village sits, but from the Belledonne granitic range that towers the valley across the Isère.

The Syndicat Intercommunal des Eaux de la Dhuy (SIED) organizes potable water distribution among 8 villages:

1. Bernin
2. Biviers
3. Corenc
4. La Tronche
5. Meylan
6. Montbonnot-Saint-Martin
7. Saint-Ismier
8. Saint-Nazaire-les-Eymes

An inverted siphon carries water from Belledonne to reservoirs at the foot of the Chartreuse cliff. Work is under way in the upper part of Biviers (Chatelard) to build a new 6,000 cubic metres (211,888 ft^{3}) water tank which is planned to be ready by 2010.

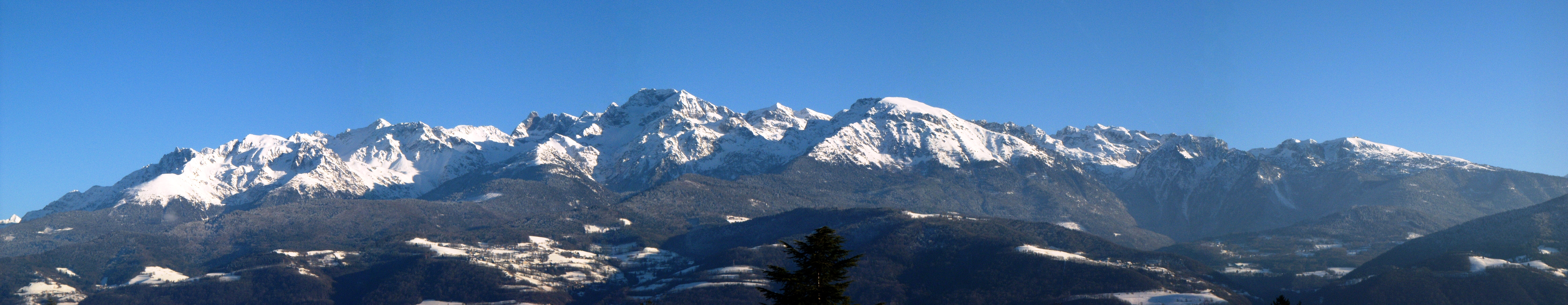
Panorama of Belledonne, seen from Biviers.

The most impressive monuments close to Biviers are the mountains that surround it such as Dent de Crolles in the Chartreuse range, or Grand Pic de Belledonne in the Belledonne range.

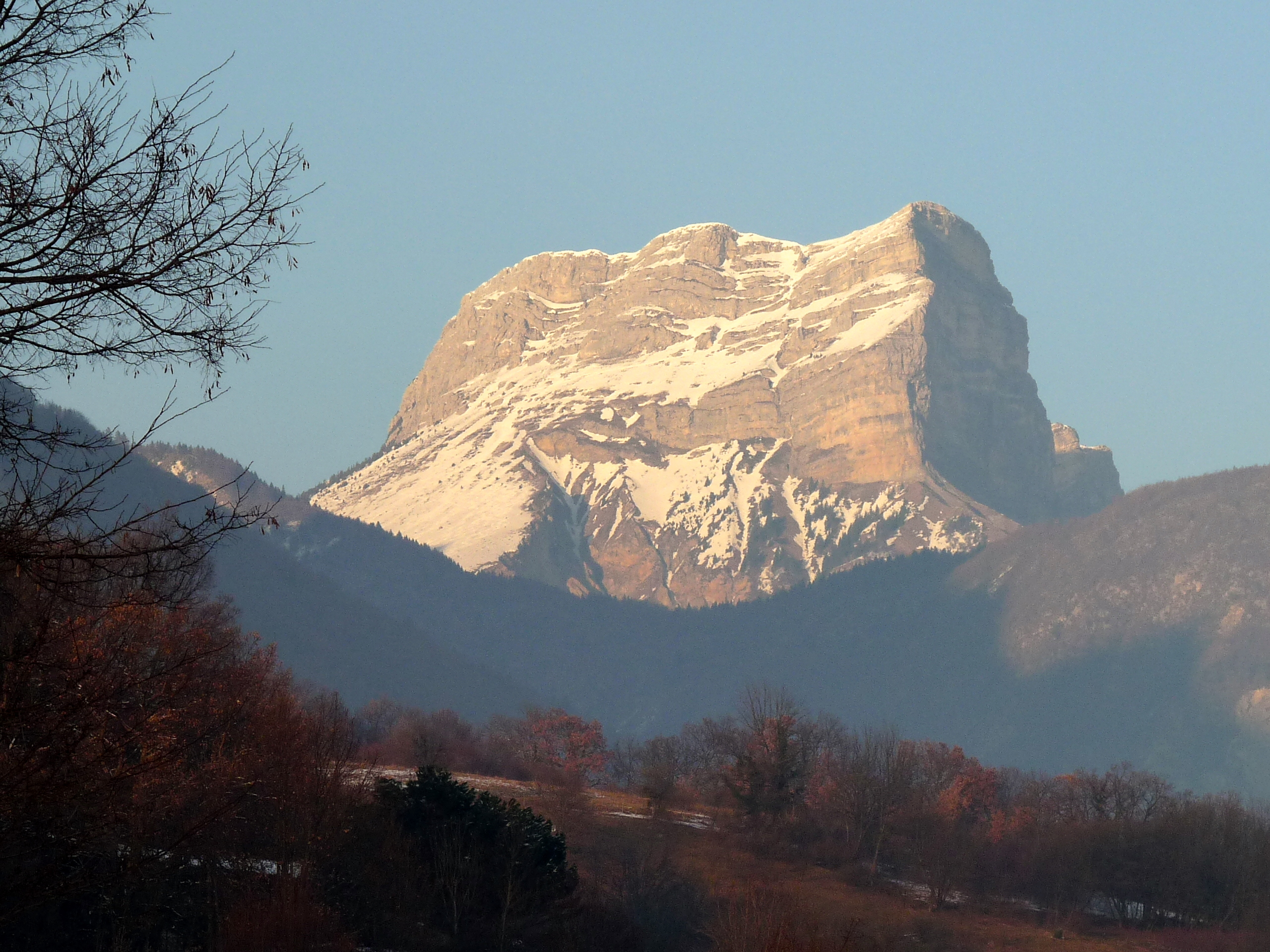
Dent de Crolles, seen from Montbives in Biviers

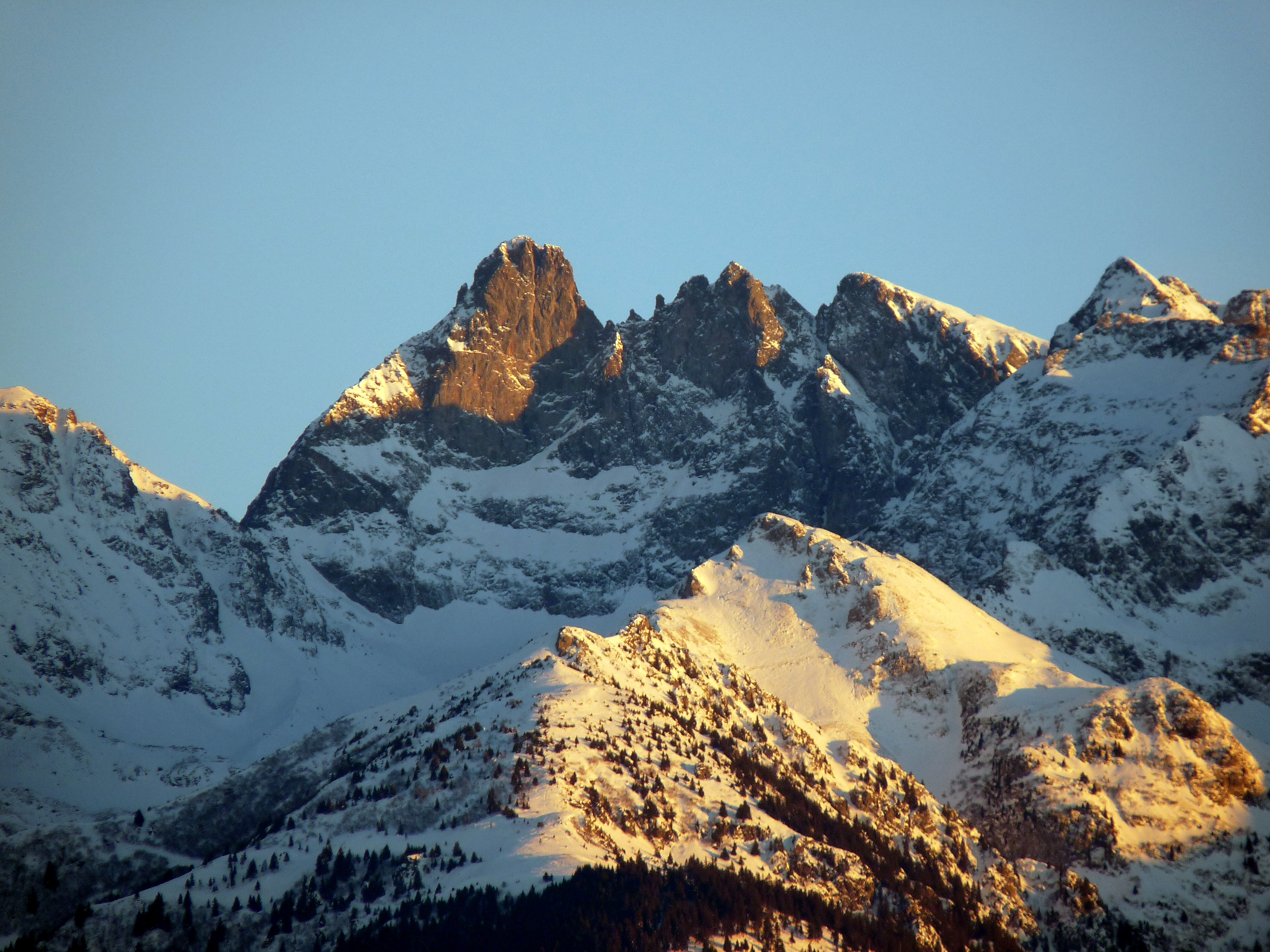
Grand Pic de Belledonne, seen from Biviers

== Economy ==
In 2017, Biviers posted the highest median disposable income per household in Isère (€36470), with Corenc, Saint-Ismier, and Bernin as close followers (in that order).
