= Saint-Jean-le-Vieux =

Saint-Jean-le-Vieux is the name of several communes in France:

- Saint-Jean-le-Vieux, Ain
- Saint-Jean-le-Vieux, Isère
- Saint-Jean-le-Vieux, Pyrénées-Atlantiques
