= La Combe-de-Lancey =

- Commune
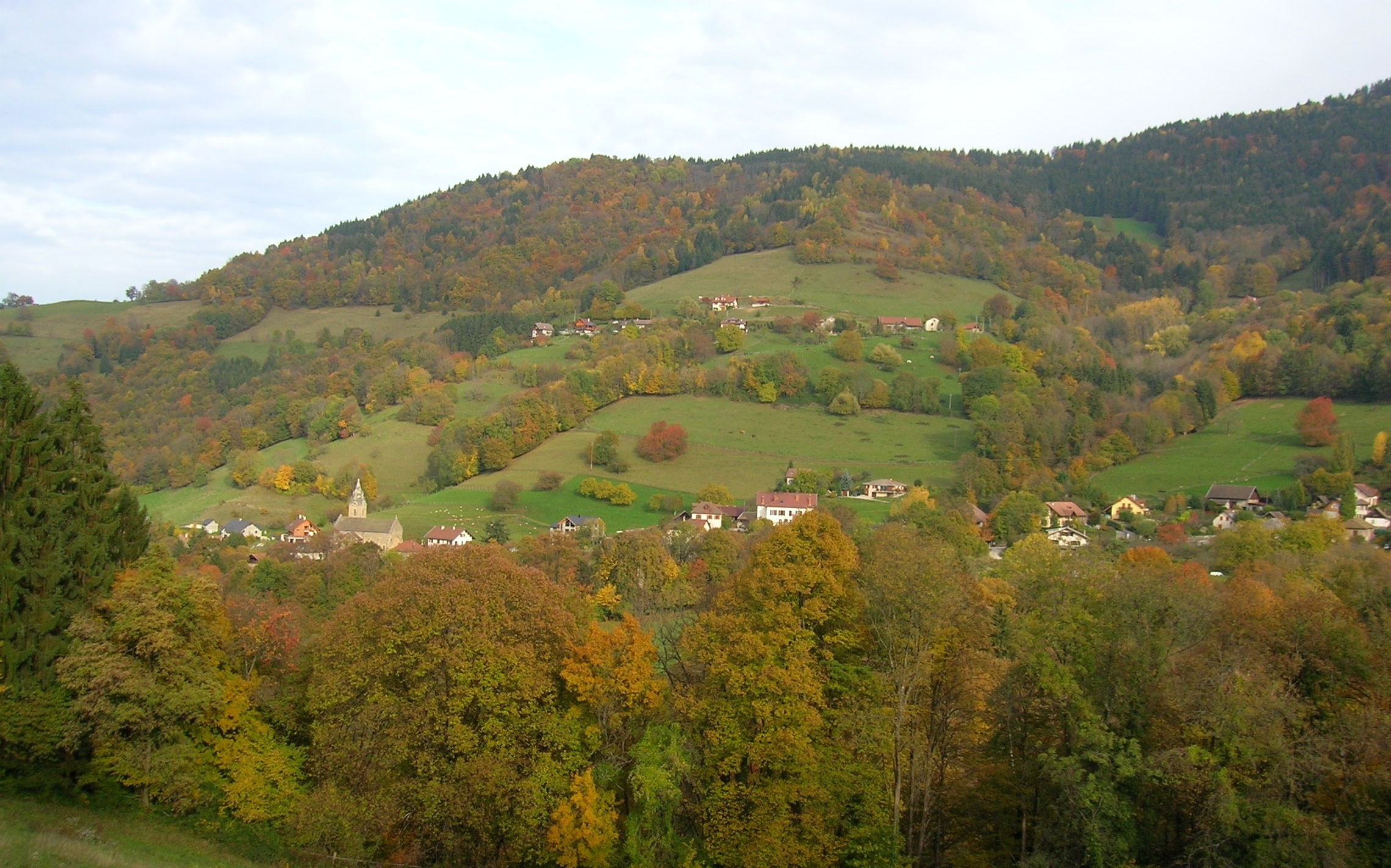
- La Chapelle in La Combe-de-Lancey
- Location of La Combe-de-Lancey
- Location within France Location within Auvergne-Rhône-Alpes
- Coordinates: 45°13′36″N 5°53′55″E
- Country: France
- Region: Auvergne-Rhône-Alpes
- Department: Isère
- Arrondissement: Grenoble
- Canton: Le Moyen Grésivaudan
- Intercommunality: CC Le Grésivaudan

Government
  - Mayor (2020–2026): Régine Villarino
- Area^{1}: 19 km^{2} (7.3 sq mi)
- Highest elevation: 2,813 m (9,229 ft)
- Lowest elevation: 316 m (1,037 ft)
- Population (2023): 745
  - Density: 39/km^{2} (100/sq mi)
- Time zone: UTC+01:00 (CET)
  - Summer (DST): UTC+02:00 (CEST)
- INSEE/Postal code: 38120 /38190
- ^{1} French Land Register data, which excludes lakes, ponds, glaciers > 1 km^{2} (0.386 sq mi or 247 acres) and river estuaries.

La Combe-de-Lancey (French pronunciation: [la kɔ̃b də lɑ̃sɛ]) is a commune in the Isère department in Auvergne-Rhône-Alpes region in southeastern France. The municipality covers an area of over 1,800 hectares. Located in the heart of the Belledonne, the town is bordered by Revel, Saint-Jean-le-Vieux, and Saint-Mury-Monteymond.

== Population ==
Historical population
Year	Pop.	±% p.a.
1968	249	—
1975	243	−0.35%
1982	350	+5.35%
1990	452	+3.25%
1999	528	+1.74%
2007	665	+2.93%
2012	702	+1.09%
2017	701	−0.03%
2023	745	+1.02%
Source: INSEE

== See also ==
- Communes of the Isère department
