= Canton of Le Moyen Grésivaudan =

Coordinates: 45.28°N 5.88°E

The canton of Le Moyen Grésivaudan is an administrative division of the Isère department, eastern France. It was created at the French canton reorganisation which came into effect in March 2015. Its seat is in Crolles.

It consists of the following communes:

1. Bernin
2. La Combe-de-Lancey
3. Crolles
4. Laval-en-Belledonne
5. Lumbin
6. Plateau-des-Petites-Roches
7. Revel
8. Sainte-Agnès
9. Saint-Ismier
10. Saint-Jean-le-Vieux
11. Saint-Mury-Monteymond
12. Saint-Nazaire-les-Eymes
13. La Terrasse
14. Le Versoud
15. Villard-Bonnot
