= Grenoble urban unit =

Coordinates: 45.1116°N 5.4337°E

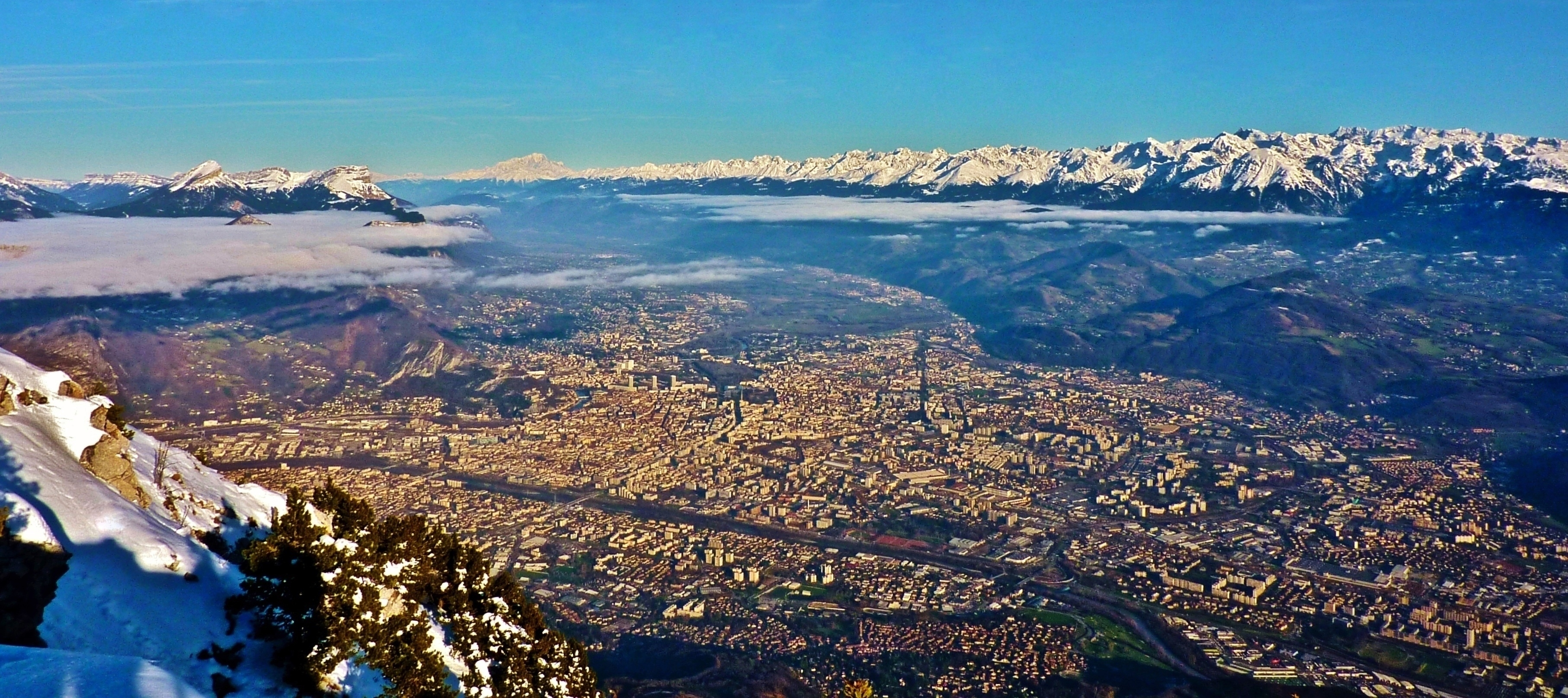
Grenoble metropolitan area viewed from the summit of Moucherotte

The urban unit of Grenoble (French: unité urbaine de Grenoble) is a French urban unit centred on the city of Grenoble. An urban unit is a contiguously built-up area with at least 2,000 inhabitants, according to the definition by the French statistics institute INSEE. In the current zoning, revised in 2020, it consists of 38 communes. It covers 358.1 km^{2} and has 451,096 inhabitants (2018), population density 1260 /km^{2}. The urban unit largely overlaps with, but should not be confused with, the administrative entity Grenoble-Alpes Métropole.

INSEE code	City	Area (km²)	Population (2018)
38045	Biviers	6.17	2,359
38057	Bresson	2.78	677
38070	Le Champ-près-Froges	4.83	1,186
38071	Champ-sur-Drac	8.92	3,090
38111	Claix	24.12	7,921
38126	Corenc	6.50	4,053
38150	Domène	5.29	6,701
38151	Échirolles	7.86	36,961
38158	Eybens	4.50	9,947
38169	Fontaine	6.74	22,906
38170	Fontanil-Cornillon	5.50	2,940
38175	Froges	6.43	3,361
38179	Gières	6.93	6,956
38185	Grenoble	18.13	157,650
38200	Jarrie	13.26	3,763
38229	Meylan	12.32	17,448
38249	Montbonnot-Saint-Martin	6.38	5,306
38271	Murianette	6.07	872
38281	Noyarey	16.86	2,216
38303	La Pierre	3.31	570
38309	Poisat	2.56	2,147
38317	Le Pont-de-Claix	5.60	10,605
38382	Saint-Égrève	10.88	15,801
38397	Saint-Ismier	14.90	7,026
38421	Saint-Martin-d'Hères	9.26	38,398
38423	Saint-Martin-le-Vinoux	10.06	5,799
38431	Saint-Nazaire-les-Eymes	8.50	2,949
38474	Sassenage	13.31	11,277
38485	Seyssinet-Pariset	10.65	12,017
38486	Seyssins	8.00	7,783
38501	Tencin	6.8	2,112
38516	La Tronche	6.42	6,588
38524	Varces-Allières-et-Risset	20.88	8,272
38533	Venon	4.34	723
38538	Le Versoud	6.35	4,876
38540	Veurey-Voroize	12.21	1,436
38547	Villard-Bonnot	5.84	7,175
38565	Voreppe	28.65	9,229
	Total	358.1	451,096

== See also ==
- Grenoble metropolitan area
