= Canton of Échirolles =

Coordinates: 45.15°N 5.72°E

The canton of Échirolles is an administrative division of the Isère department, eastern France. It was created at the French canton reorganisation which came into effect in March 2015. Its seat is in Échirolles.

It consists of the following communes:

1. Bresson
2. Échirolles
3. Eybens
