= La Pierre =

- Commune
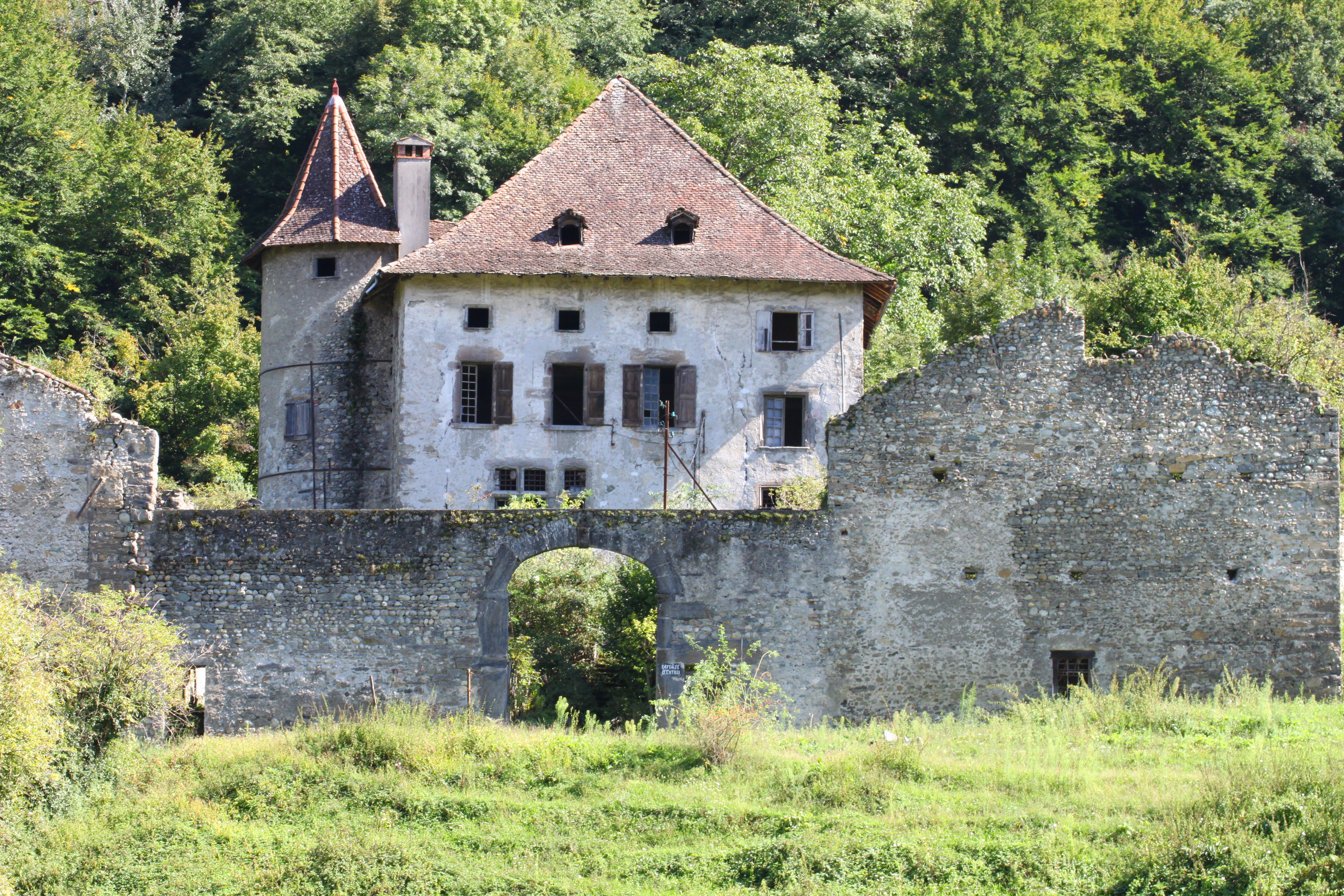
- Manor of Veaubeaunnais
- Location of La Pierre
- Location within France Location within Auvergne-Rhône-Alpes
- Coordinates: 45°17′40″N 5°56′57″E
- Country: France
- Region: Auvergne-Rhône-Alpes
- Department: Isère
- Arrondissement: Grenoble
- Canton: Le Haut-Grésivaudan
- Intercommunality: CC Le Grésivaudan

Government
  - Mayor (2020–2026): Jean-Yves Gayet
- Area^{1}: 3 km^{2} (1.2 sq mi)
- Elevation: 233 m (764 ft)
- Highest elevation: 452 m (1,483 ft)
- Lowest elevation: 225 m (738 ft)
- Population (2023): 664
  - Density: 220/km^{2} (570/sq mi)
- Time zone: UTC+01:00 (CET)
  - Summer (DST): UTC+02:00 (CEST)
- INSEE/Postal code: 38303 /38570
- ^{1} French Land Register data, which excludes lakes, ponds, glaciers > 1 km^{2} (0.386 sq mi or 247 acres) and river estuaries.

La Pierre (French pronunciation: [la pjɛʁ]) is a commune in the Isère department in southeastern France. It is part of the Grenoble urban unit (agglomeration).

The commune is surrounded by agricultural land, giving the village its rural character.

== Population ==
Historical population
Year	Pop.	±% p.a.
1968	162	—
1975	186	+1.99%
1982	301	+7.12%
1990	375	+2.79%
1999	390	+0.44%
2007	452	+1.86%
2012	471	+0.83%
2017	574	+4.03%
2023	664	+2.46%
Source: INSEE

== See also ==
- Communes of the Isère department
