= Poisat =

- Commune
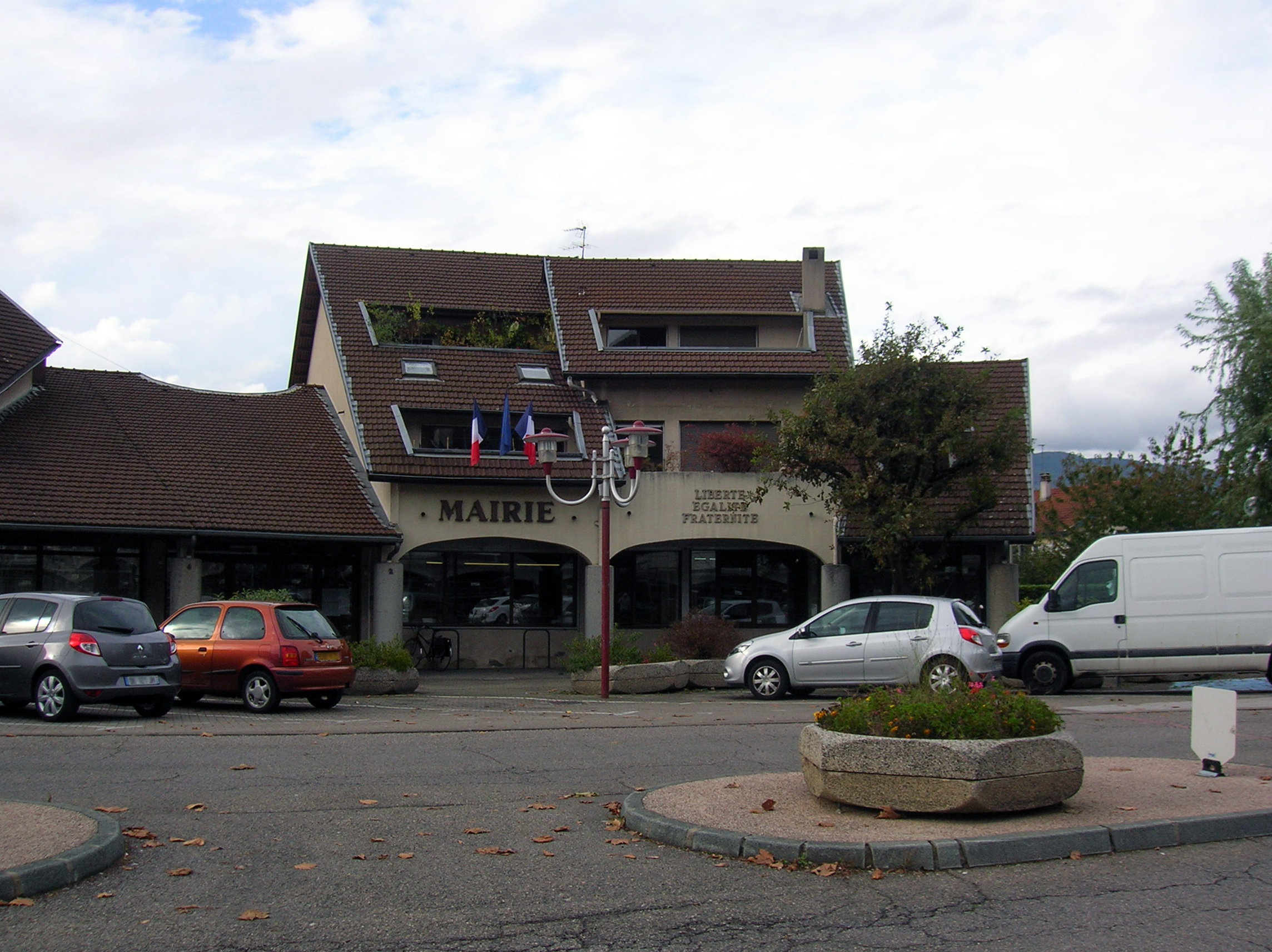
- Town hall

- Coat of arms
- Location of Poisat
- Location within France Location within Auvergne-Rhône-Alpes
- Coordinates: 45°09′31″N 5°45′33″E
- Country: France
- Region: Auvergne-Rhône-Alpes
- Department: Isère
- Arrondissement: Grenoble
- Canton: Saint-Martin-d'Hères
- Intercommunality: Grenoble-Alpes Métropole

Government
  - Mayor (2020–2026): Ludovic Bustos
- Area^{1}: 2.56 km^{2} (0.99 sq mi)
- Elevation: 250 m (820 ft)
- Highest elevation: 724 m (2,375 ft)
- Lowest elevation: 214 m (702 ft)
- Population (2023): 2,173
  - Density: 849/km^{2} (2,200/sq mi)
- Time zone: UTC+01:00 (CET)
  - Summer (DST): UTC+02:00 (CEST)
- INSEE/Postal code: 38309 /38320
- ^{1} French Land Register data, which excludes lakes, ponds, glaciers > 1 km^{2} (0.386 sq mi or 247 acres) and river estuaries.

Poisat (French pronunciation: [pwaza]) is a commune in the Isère department in southeastern France. It is part of the Grenoble urban unit (agglomeration).

== Population ==
Historical population

Year	Pop.	±% p.a.
1793	232	—
1800	283	+2.88%
1806	260	−1.40%
1821	265	+0.13%
1831	340	+2.52%
1836	355	+0.87%
1841	337	−1.04%
1846	338	+0.06%
1851	315	−1.40%
1856	308	−0.45%
1861	282	−1.75%
1866	285	+0.21%
1872	263	−1.33%
1876	315	+4.61%
1881	285	−1.98%
1886	643	+17.67%
1891	257	−16.76%
1896	247	−0.79%
1901	221	−2.20%

Year	Pop.	±% p.a.
1906	221	+0.00%
1911	216	−0.46%
1921	233	+0.76%
1926	246	+1.09%
1931	257	+0.88%
1936	263	+0.46%
1946	256	−0.27%
1954	456	+7.48%
1962	744	+6.31%
1968	1,074	+6.31%
1975	1,663	+6.45%
1982	2,056	+3.08%
1990	2,139	+0.50%
1999	2,081	−0.30%
2007	2,079	−0.01%
2012	2,105	+0.25%
2017	2,168	+0.59%
2023	2,173	+0.04%

Source: EHESS and INSEE (1968-2023)

== See also ==
- Communes of the Isère department
