= Murianette =

- Commune
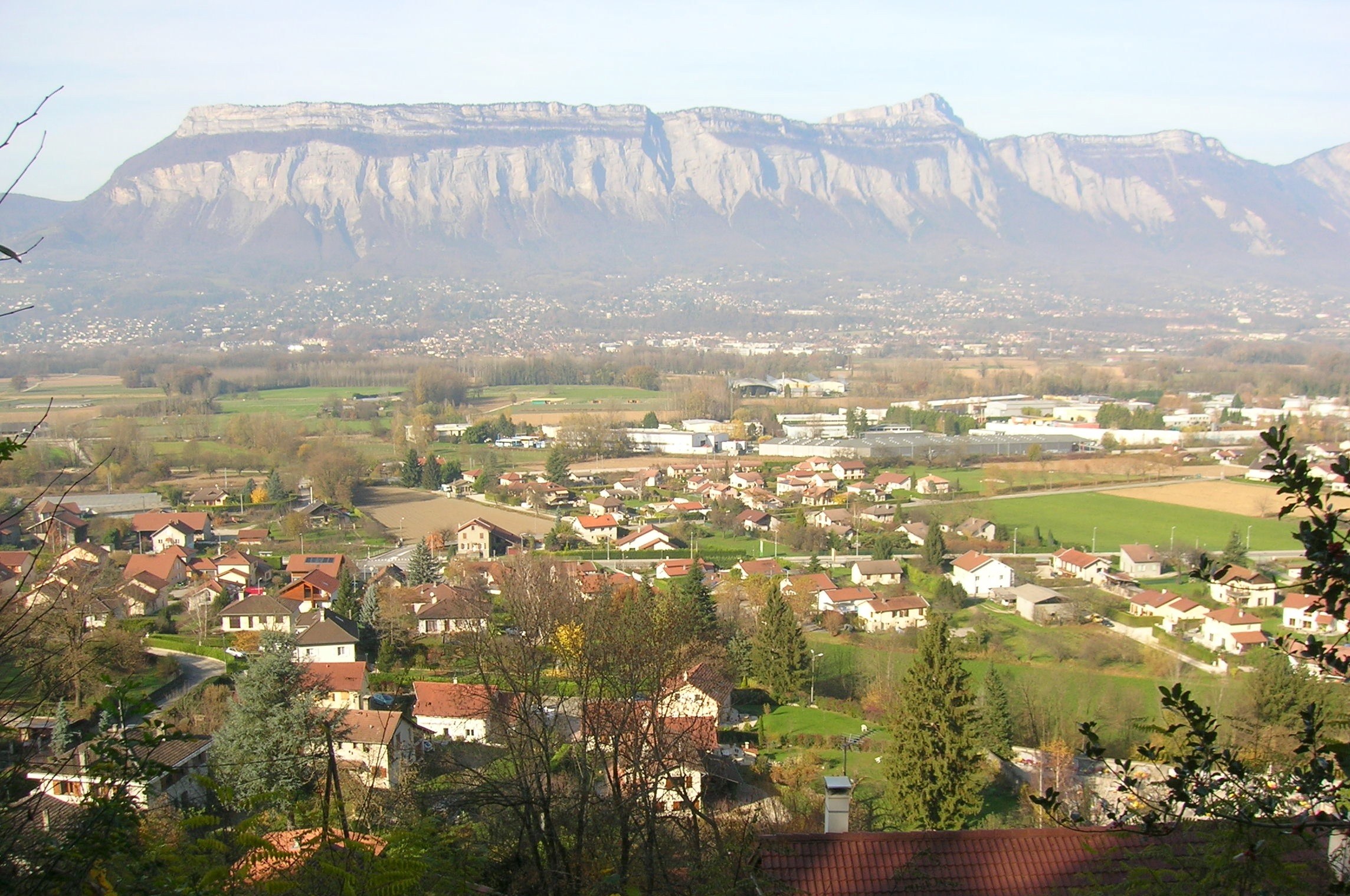
- A general view of Murianette
- Location of Murianette
- Location within France Location within Auvergne-Rhône-Alpes
- Coordinates: 45°11′28″N 5°49′13″E
- Country: France
- Region: Auvergne-Rhône-Alpes
- Department: Isère
- Arrondissement: Grenoble
- Canton: Meylan
- Intercommunality: Grenoble-Alpes Métropole

Government
  - Mayor (2020–2026): Cédric Garcin
- Area^{1}: 6 km^{2} (2.3 sq mi)
- Highest elevation: 999 m (3,278 ft)
- Lowest elevation: 213 m (699 ft)
- Population (2023): 910
  - Density: 150/km^{2} (390/sq mi)
- Time zone: UTC+01:00 (CET)
  - Summer (DST): UTC+02:00 (CEST)
- INSEE/Postal code: 38271 /38420
- ^{1} French Land Register data, which excludes lakes, ponds, glaciers > 1 km^{2} (0.386 sq mi or 247 acres) and river estuaries.

Murianette (French pronunciation: [myʁjanɛt]) is a commune in the Isère department in southeastern France. It is part of the Grenoble urban unit (agglomeration).

== Population ==
Historical population
Year	Pop.	±% p.a.
1968	420	—
1975	467	+1.53%
1982	529	+1.80%
1990	542	+0.30%
1999	614	+1.40%
2007	746	+2.46%
2012	883	+3.43%
2017	882	−0.02%
2023	910	+0.52%
Source: INSEE

== See also ==
- Communes of the Isère department
