= Saint-Michel-les-Portes =

- Commune
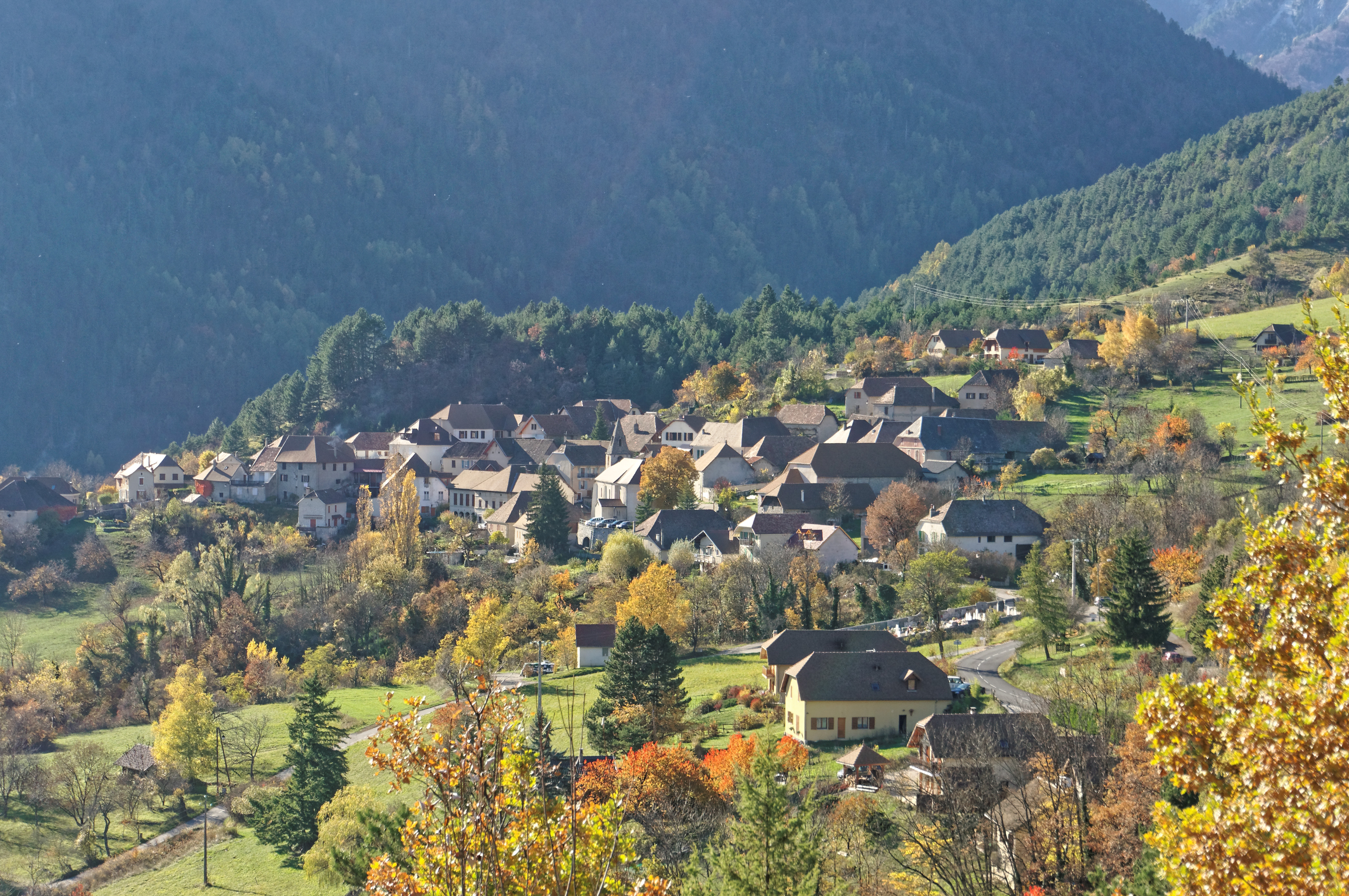
- The village of Saint-Michel-les-Portes
- Location of Saint-Michel-les-Portes
- Location within France Location within Auvergne-Rhône-Alpes
- Coordinates: 44°52′10″N 5°35′41″E
- Country: France
- Region: Auvergne-Rhône-Alpes
- Department: Isère
- Arrondissement: Grenoble
- Canton: Matheysine-Trièves

Government
  - Mayor (2020–2026): Joël Zoppe
- Area^{1}: 21 km^{2} (8.1 sq mi)
- Elevation: 900 m (3,000 ft)
- Highest elevation: 2,082 m (6,831 ft)
- Lowest elevation: 558 m (1,831 ft)
- Population (2023): 285
  - Density: 14/km^{2} (35/sq mi)
- Time zone: UTC+01:00 (CET)
  - Summer (DST): UTC+02:00 (CEST)
- INSEE/Postal code: 38429 /38650
- ^{1} French Land Register data, which excludes lakes, ponds, glaciers > 1 km^{2} (0.386 sq mi or 247 acres) and river estuaries.

Saint-Michel-les-Portes (French pronunciation: [sɛ̃ miʃɛl le pɔʁt]) is a commune in the Isère department in southeastern France.

== Population ==
Historical population
Year	Pop.	±% p.a.
1968	112	—
1975	85	−3.86%
1982	96	+1.75%
1990	107	+1.37%
1999	143	+3.27%
2007	185	+3.27%
2012	254	+6.54%
2017	269	+1.15%
2023	285	+0.97%
Source: INSEE

== See also ==
- Communes of the Isère department
- Parc naturel régional du Vercors
