= La Terrasse =

- Commune
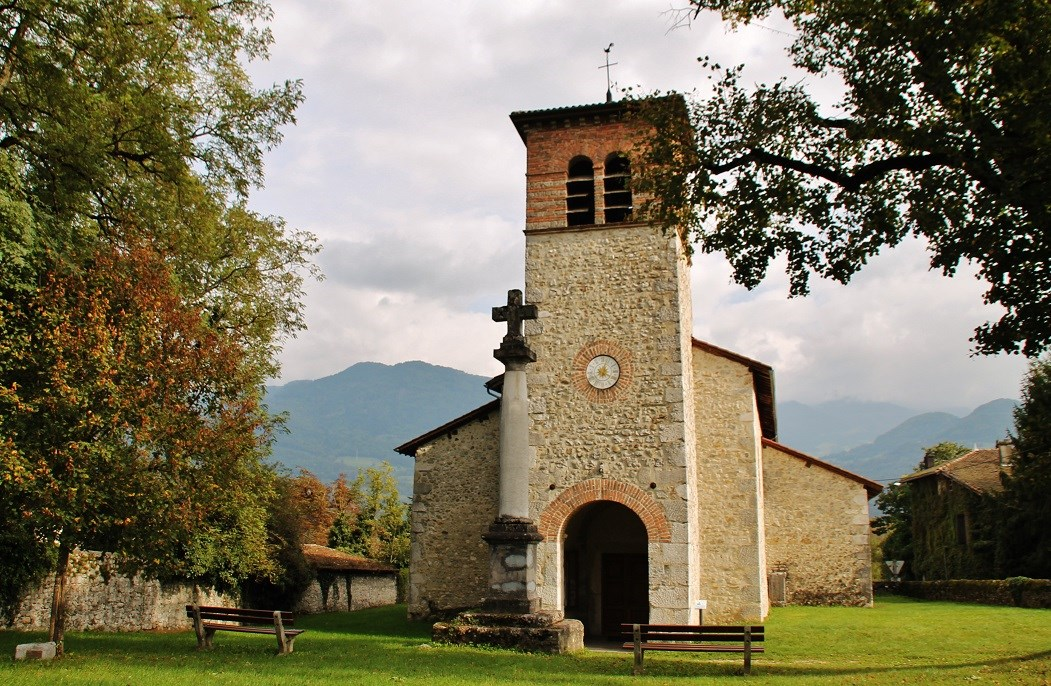
- The church of Saint Aupre, in La Terrasse
- Location of La Terrasse
- Location within France Location within Auvergne-Rhône-Alpes
- Coordinates: 45°19′28″N 5°55′55″E
- Country: France
- Region: Auvergne-Rhône-Alpes
- Department: Isère
- Arrondissement: Grenoble
- Canton: Le Moyen Grésivaudan
- Intercommunality: CC Le Grésivaudan

Government
  - Mayor (2020–2026): Annick Guichard
- Area^{1}: 9 km^{2} (3.5 sq mi)
- Elevation: 247 m (810 ft)
- Highest elevation: 1,045 m (3,428 ft)
- Lowest elevation: 229 m (751 ft)
- Population (2023): 2,470
  - Density: 270/km^{2} (710/sq mi)
- Time zone: UTC+01:00 (CET)
  - Summer (DST): UTC+02:00 (CEST)
- INSEE/Postal code: 38503 /38660
- Website: mairie-laterrasse.fr
- ^{1} French Land Register data, which excludes lakes, ponds, glaciers > 1 km^{2} (0.386 sq mi or 247 acres) and river estuaries.

La Terrasse (French pronunciation: [la tɛʁas]) is a commune in the Isère department in southeastern France.

== Population ==
Historical population

| Year | Pop. | ±% p.a. |
|---|---|---|
| 1793 | 880 | — |
| 1821 | 1,235 | +1.22% |
| 1846 | 1,282 | +0.15% |
| 1872 | 1,225 | −0.17% |
| 1901 | 854 | −1.24% |
| 1926 | 582 | −1.52% |
| 1946 | 614 | +0.27% |
| 1962 | 863 | +2.15% |
| 1968 | 762 | −2.05% |

| Year | Pop. | ±% p.a. |
|---|---|---|
| 1975 | 835 | +1.32% |
| 1982 | 1,012 | +2.78% |
| 1990 | 1,291 | +3.09% |
| 1999 | 1,913 | +4.47% |
| 2007 | 2,244 | +2.01% |
| 2012 | 2,418 | +1.50% |
| 2017 | 2,539 | +0.98% |
| 2023 | 2,470 | −0.46% |

Source: EHESS and INSEE (1968-2023)

== See also ==
- Communes of the Isère department
