= Venon, Isère =

Venon
- Commune
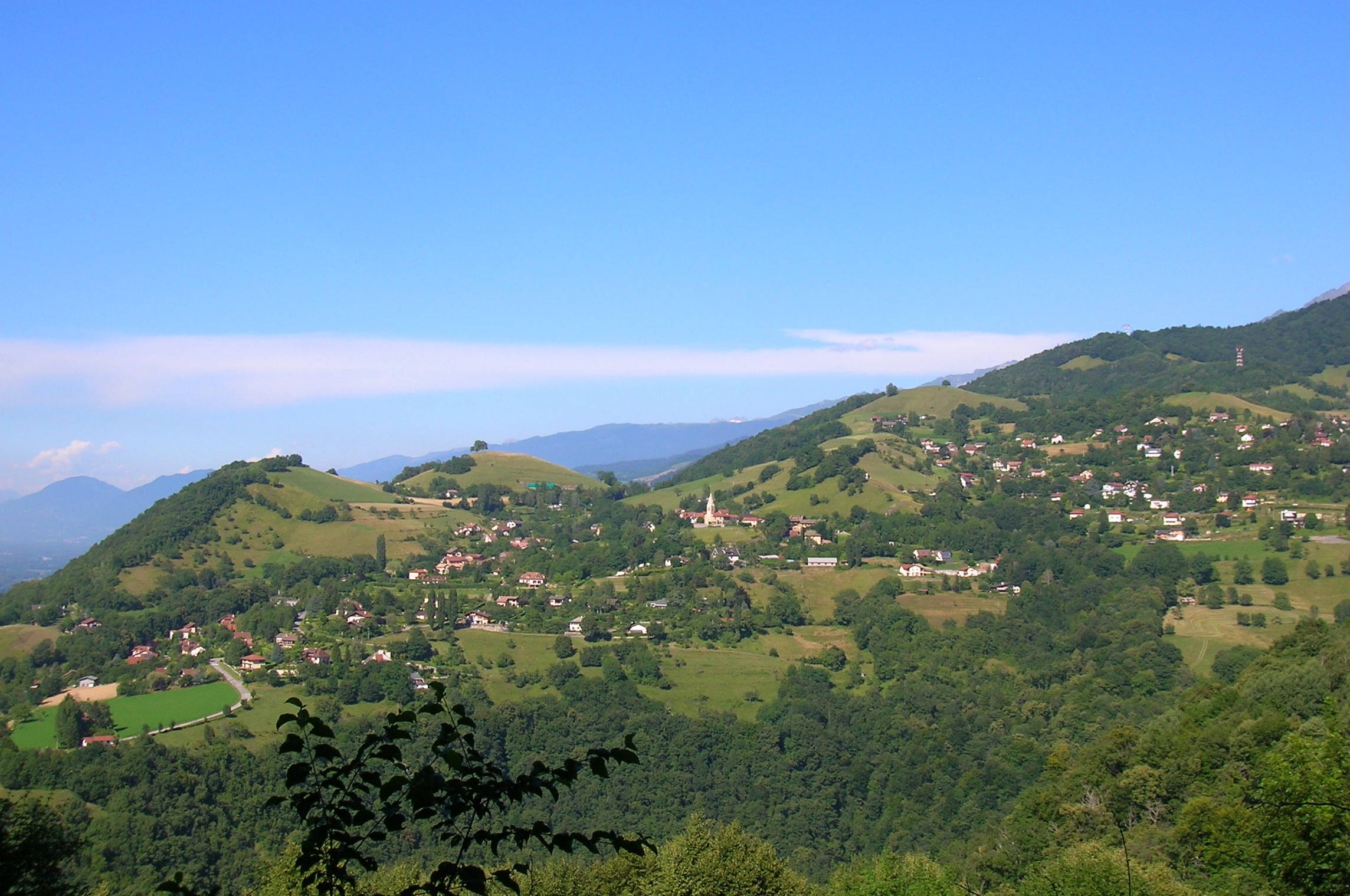
- A general view of Venon
- Location of Venon
- Location within France Location within Auvergne-Rhône-Alpes
- Coordinates: 45°10′22″N 5°48′19″E
- Country: France
- Region: Auvergne-Rhône-Alpes
- Department: Isère
- Arrondissement: Grenoble
- Canton: Saint-Martin-d'Hères
- Intercommunality: Grenoble-Alpes Métropole

Government
  - Mayor (2020–2026): Marc Oddon
- Area^{1}: 4.34 km^{2} (1.68 sq mi)
- Highest elevation: 921 m (3,022 ft)
- Lowest elevation: 298 m (978 ft)
- Population (2023): 841
  - Density: 194/km^{2} (502/sq mi)
- Time zone: UTC+01:00 (CET)
  - Summer (DST): UTC+02:00 (CEST)
- INSEE/Postal code: 38533 /38610
- ^{1} French Land Register data, which excludes lakes, ponds, glaciers > 1 km^{2} (0.386 sq mi or 247 acres) and river estuaries.

Venon (French pronunciation: [vənɔ̃]) is a commune in the Isère department in southeastern France. It is part of the Grenoble urban unit (agglomeration).

== Population ==
Historical population
Year	Pop.	±% p.a.
1968	199	—
1975	452	+12.43%
1982	551	+2.87%
1990	551	+0.00%
1999	677	+2.31%
2007	697	+0.36%
2012	732	+0.98%
2017	729	−0.08%
2023	841	+2.41%
Source: INSEE

== See also ==
- Communes of the Isère department
