= Saint-Martin-de-Clelles =

- Commune
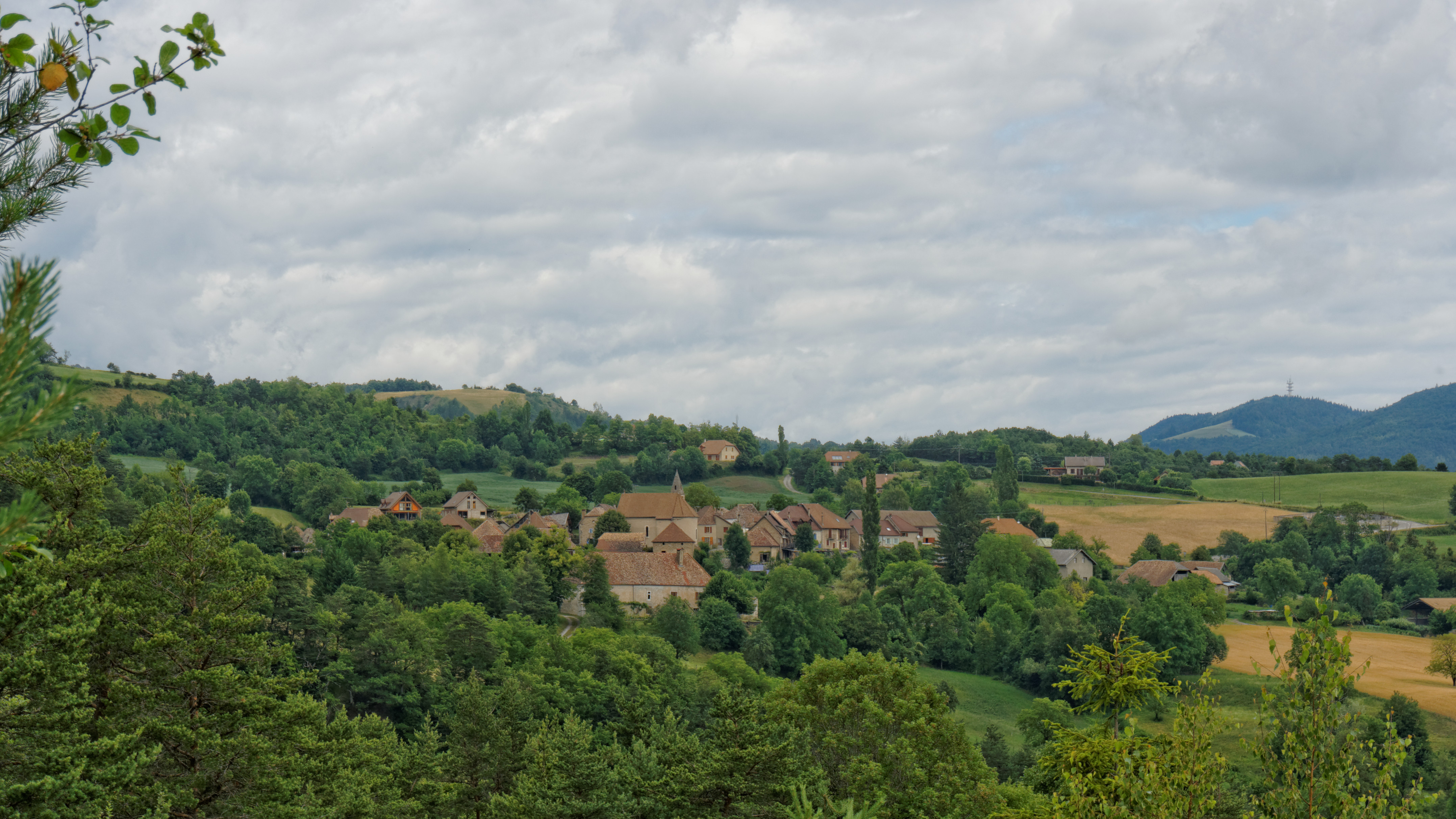
- A general view of Saint-Martin-de-Clelles
- Location of Saint-Martin-de-Clelles
- Location within France Location within Auvergne-Rhône-Alpes
- Coordinates: 44°50′47″N 5°37′01″E
- Country: France
- Region: Auvergne-Rhône-Alpes
- Department: Isère
- Arrondissement: Grenoble
- Canton: Matheysine-Trièves

Government
  - Mayor (2020–2026): Christine Cholat
- Area^{1}: 15 km^{2} (5.8 sq mi)
- Highest elevation: 2,082 m (6,831 ft)
- Lowest elevation: 519 m (1,703 ft)
- Population (2023): 184
  - Density: 12/km^{2} (32/sq mi)
- Time zone: UTC+01:00 (CET)
  - Summer (DST): UTC+02:00 (CEST)
- INSEE/Postal code: 38419 /38930
- ^{1} French Land Register data, which excludes lakes, ponds, glaciers > 1 km^{2} (0.386 sq mi or 247 acres) and river estuaries.

Saint-Martin-de-Clelles (French pronunciation: [sɛ̃ maʁtɛ̃ də klɛl], literally Saint-Martin of Clelles) is a commune in the Isère department (Auvergne Rhône-Alpes) in southeastern France.

== Population ==
Historical population
Year	Pop.	±% p.a.
1968	60	—
1975	70	+2.23%
1982	103	+5.67%
1990	122	+2.14%
1999	118	−0.37%
2007	150	+3.04%
2012	175	+3.13%
2017	186	+1.23%
2023	184	−0.18%
Source: INSEE

== See also ==
- Communes of the Isère department
- Parc naturel régional du Vercors
