= Bresson, Isère =

Bresson
- Commune
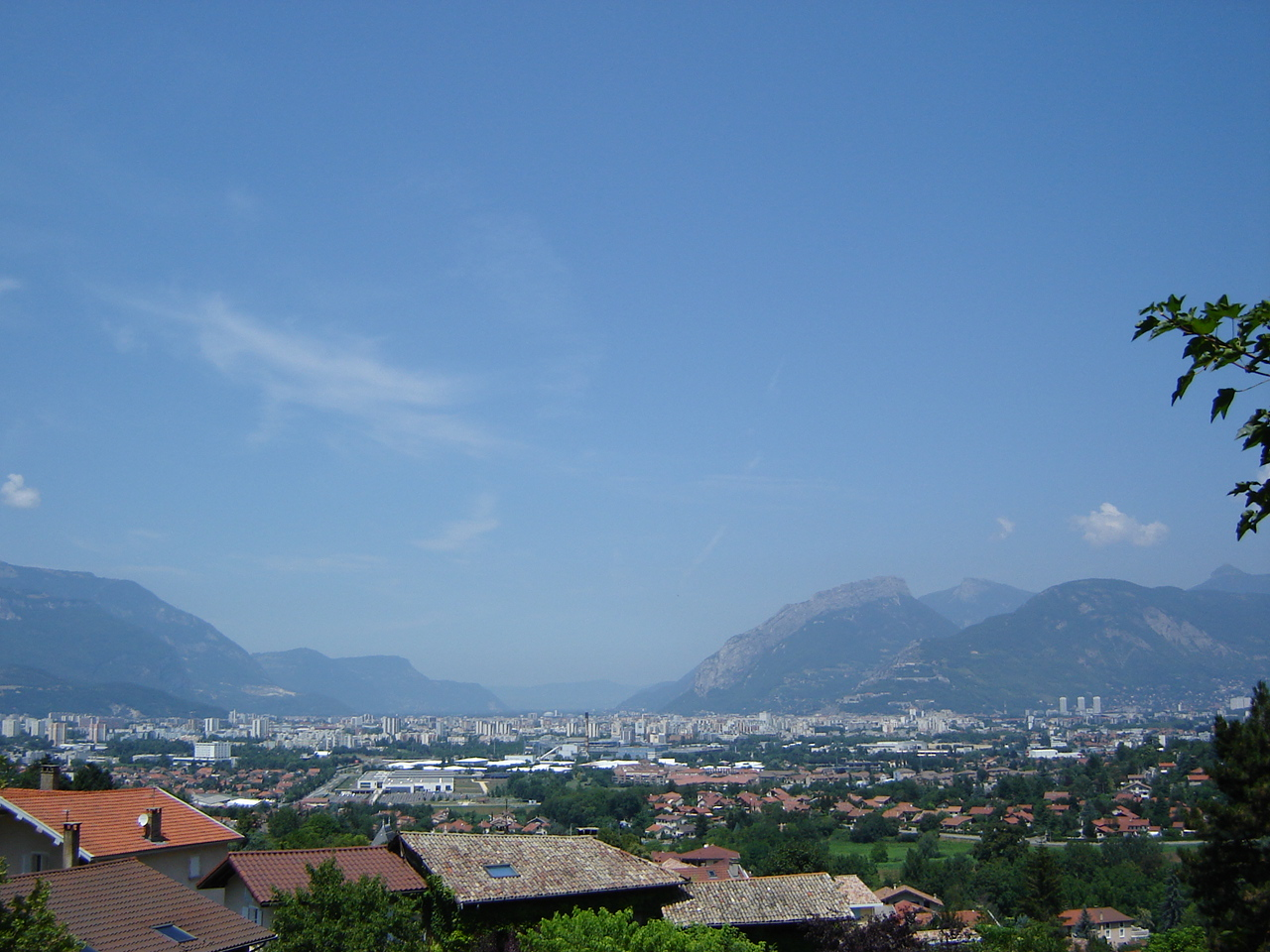
- View towards Grenoble
- Location of Bresson
- Location within France Location within Auvergne-Rhône-Alpes
- Coordinates: 45°08′23″N 5°44′53″E
- Country: France
- Region: Auvergne-Rhône-Alpes
- Department: Isère
- Arrondissement: Grenoble
- Canton: Échirolles
- Intercommunality: Grenoble-Alpes Métropole

Government
  - Mayor (2020–2026): Audrey Guyomard
- Area^{1}: 2.80 km^{2} (1.08 sq mi)
- Highest elevation: 533 m (1,749 ft)
- Lowest elevation: 228 m (748 ft)
- Population (2023): 663
  - Density: 237/km^{2} (613/sq mi)
- Time zone: UTC+01:00 (CET)
  - Summer (DST): UTC+02:00 (CEST)
- INSEE/Postal code: 38057 /38320
- ^{1} French Land Register data, which excludes lakes, ponds, glaciers > 1 km^{2} (0.386 sq mi or 247 acres) and river estuaries.

Bresson (French pronunciation: [bʁɛsɔ̃]) is a commune in the Isère department in southeastern France. It is part of the Grenoble urban unit (agglomeration).

== Population ==
Historical population
Year	Pop.	±% p.a.
1968	309	—
1975	359	+2.17%
1982	474	+4.05%
1990	753	+5.96%
1999	739	−0.21%
2007	696	−0.75%
2012	686	−0.29%
2017	684	−0.06%
2023	663	−0.52%
Source: INSEE

== See also ==
- Communes of the Isère department
