= Laval-en-Belledonne =

- Commune
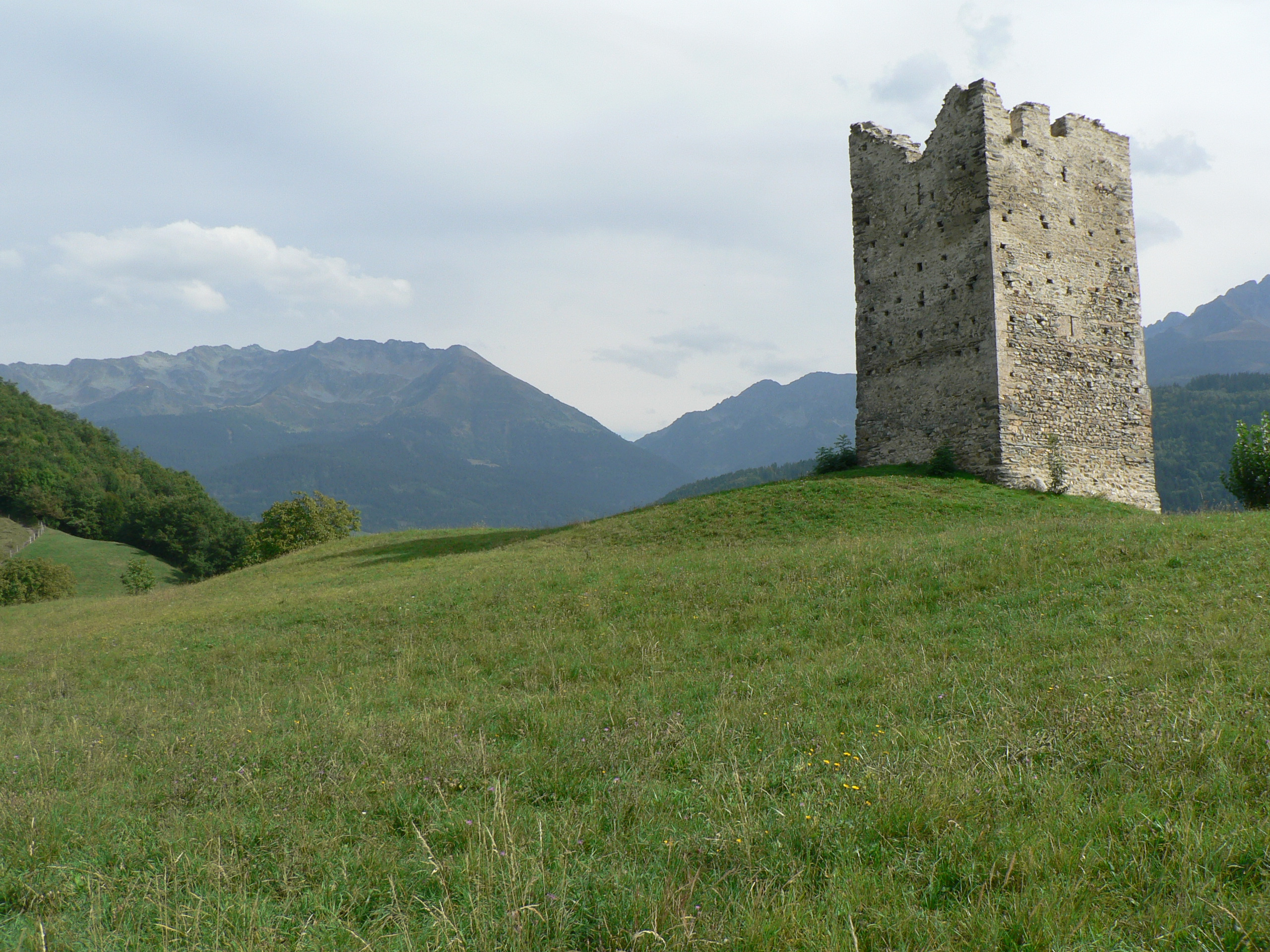
- Tower of Montfallet

- Coat of arms
- Location of Laval-en-Belledonne
- Location within France Location within Auvergne-Rhône-Alpes
- Coordinates: 45°15′14″N 5°56′00″E
- Country: France
- Region: Auvergne-Rhône-Alpes
- Department: Isère
- Arrondissement: Grenoble
- Canton: Le Moyen Grésivaudan
- Intercommunality: CC Le Grésivaudan

Government
  - Mayor (2020–2026): Mireille Degoul-Stissi
- Area^{1}: 25.33 km^{2} (9.78 sq mi)
- Elevation: 630 m (2,070 ft)
- Highest elevation: 2,600 m (8,500 ft)
- Lowest elevation: 320 m (1,050 ft)
- Population (2023): 1,029
  - Density: 40.62/km^{2} (105.2/sq mi)
- Time zone: UTC+01:00 (CET)
  - Summer (DST): UTC+02:00 (CEST)
- INSEE/Postal code: 38206 /38190
- ^{1} French Land Register data, which excludes lakes, ponds, glaciers > 1 km^{2} (0.386 sq mi or 247 acres) and river estuaries.

Laval-en-Belledonne (French pronunciation: [laval ɑ̃ bɛldɔn]; before 2020: Laval) is a commune in the Isère department in southeastern France.

== Population ==
Historical population
Year	Pop.	±% p.a.
1968	448	—
1975	450	+0.06%
1982	422	−0.91%
1990	525	+2.77%
1999	805	+4.86%
2007	934	+1.88%
2012	979	+0.95%
2017	984	+0.10%
2023	1,029	+0.75%
Source: INSEE

== History ==
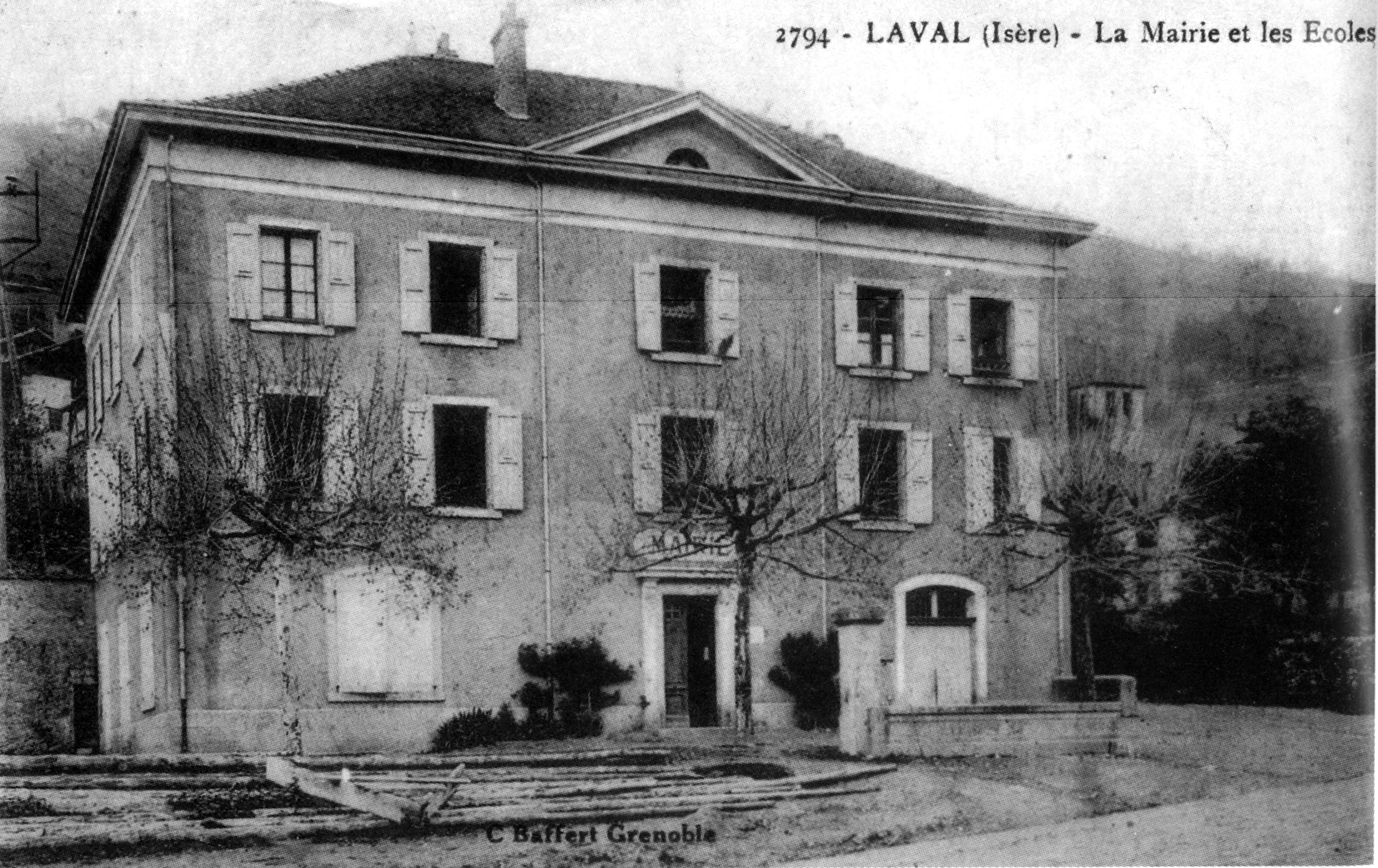
The Laval town hall and schools in 1908

== See also ==
- Communes of the Isère department
