= Saint-Nazaire-les-Eymes =

- Commune
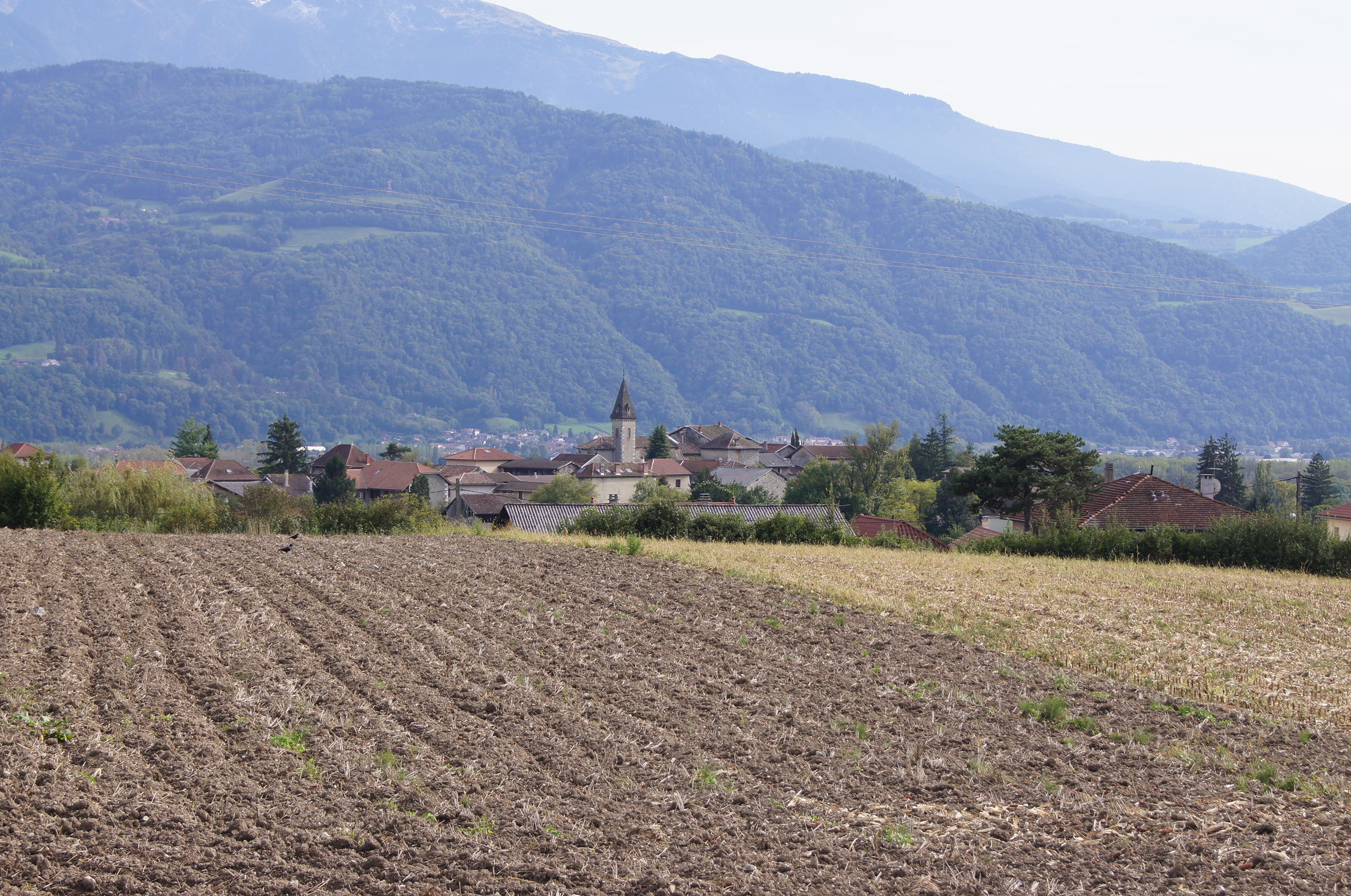
- A general view of Saint-Nazaire-les-Eymes
- Location of Saint-Nazaire-les-Eymes
- Location within France Location within Auvergne-Rhône-Alpes
- Coordinates: 45°14′00″N 5°51′00″E
- Country: France
- Region: Auvergne-Rhône-Alpes
- Department: Isère
- Arrondissement: Grenoble
- Canton: Le Moyen Grésivaudan
- Intercommunality: CC Le Grésivaudan

Government
  - Mayor (2020–2026): Michèle Flamand
- Area^{1}: 8.5 km^{2} (3.3 sq mi)
- Elevation: 283 m (928 ft)
- Highest elevation: 1,738 m (5,702 ft)
- Lowest elevation: 221 m (725 ft)
- Population (2023): 3,016
  - Density: 350/km^{2} (920/sq mi)
- Time zone: UTC+01:00 (CET)
  - Summer (DST): UTC+02:00 (CEST)
- INSEE/Postal code: 38431 /38330
- ^{1} French Land Register data, which excludes lakes, ponds, glaciers > 1 km^{2} (0.386 sq mi or 247 acres) and river estuaries.

Saint-Nazaire-les-Eymes (French pronunciation: [sɛ̃ nazɛːʁ lez‿ɛm]) is a commune in the Isère department in southeastern France. It is part of the Grenoble urban unit (agglomeration).

== Population ==
Historical population

Year	Pop.	±% p.a.
1793	464	—
1821	578	+0.79%
1846	638	+0.40%
1872	575	−0.40%
1901	446	−0.87%
1926	377	−0.67%
1946	373	−0.05%
1962	507	+1.94%
1968	728	+6.22%

Year	Pop.	±% p.a.
1975	1,302	+8.66%
1982	1,684	+3.74%
1990	1,940	+1.78%
1999	2,342	+2.11%
2007	2,786	+2.19%
2012	2,942	+1.10%
2017	2,955	+0.09%
2023	3,016	+0.34%

Source: EHESS and INSEE (1968-2023)
