= Revel, Isère =

Revel
- Commune
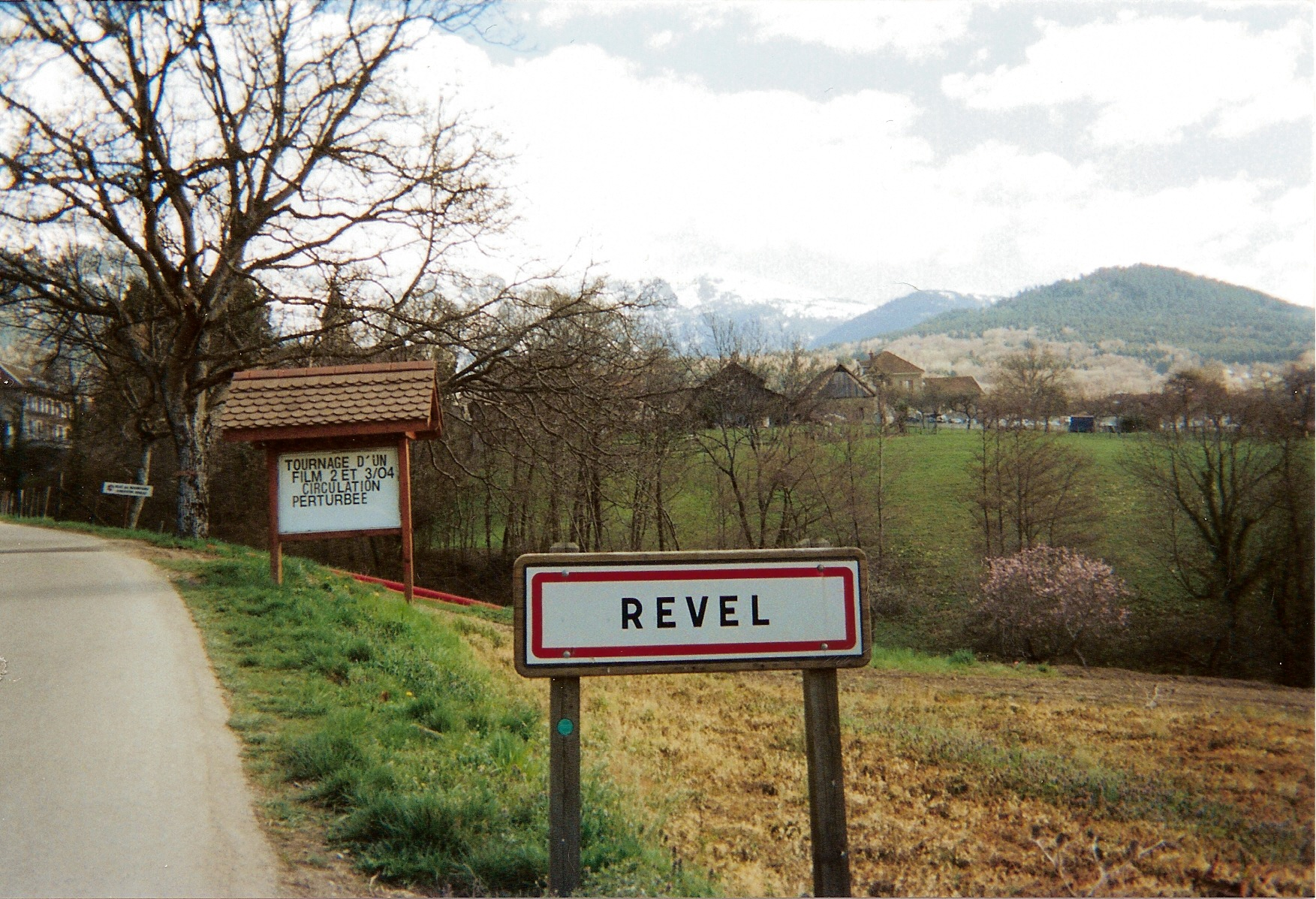
- The road into Revel
- Location of Revel
- Location within France Location within Auvergne-Rhône-Alpes
- Coordinates: 45°11′10″N 5°52′14″E
- Country: France
- Region: Auvergne-Rhône-Alpes
- Department: Isère
- Arrondissement: Grenoble
- Canton: Le Moyen Grésivaudan
- Intercommunality: Le Grésivaudan

Government
  - Mayor (2020–2026): Coralie Bourdelain
- Area^{1}: 29.55 km^{2} (11.41 sq mi)
- Highest elevation: 2,840 m (9,320 ft)
- Lowest elevation: 299 m (981 ft)
- Population (2023): 1,312
  - Density: 44.40/km^{2} (115.0/sq mi)
- Time zone: UTC+01:00 (CET)
  - Summer (DST): UTC+02:00 (CEST)
- INSEE/Postal code: 38334 /38420
- ^{1} French Land Register data, which excludes lakes, ponds, glaciers > 1 km^{2} (0.386 sq mi or 247 acres) and river estuaries.

Revel (French pronunciation: [ʁəvɛl]) is a commune in the Isère department in southeastern France.

== Population ==
Historical population
Year	Pop.	±% p.a.
1968	280	—
1975	367	+3.94%
1982	573	+6.57%
1990	875	+5.43%
1999	1,162	+3.20%
2007	1,289	+1.30%
2012	1,413	+1.85%
2017	1,314	−1.44%
2023	1,312	−0.03%
Source: INSEE

== See also ==
- Communes of the Isère department
