= Saint-Ismier =

- Commune
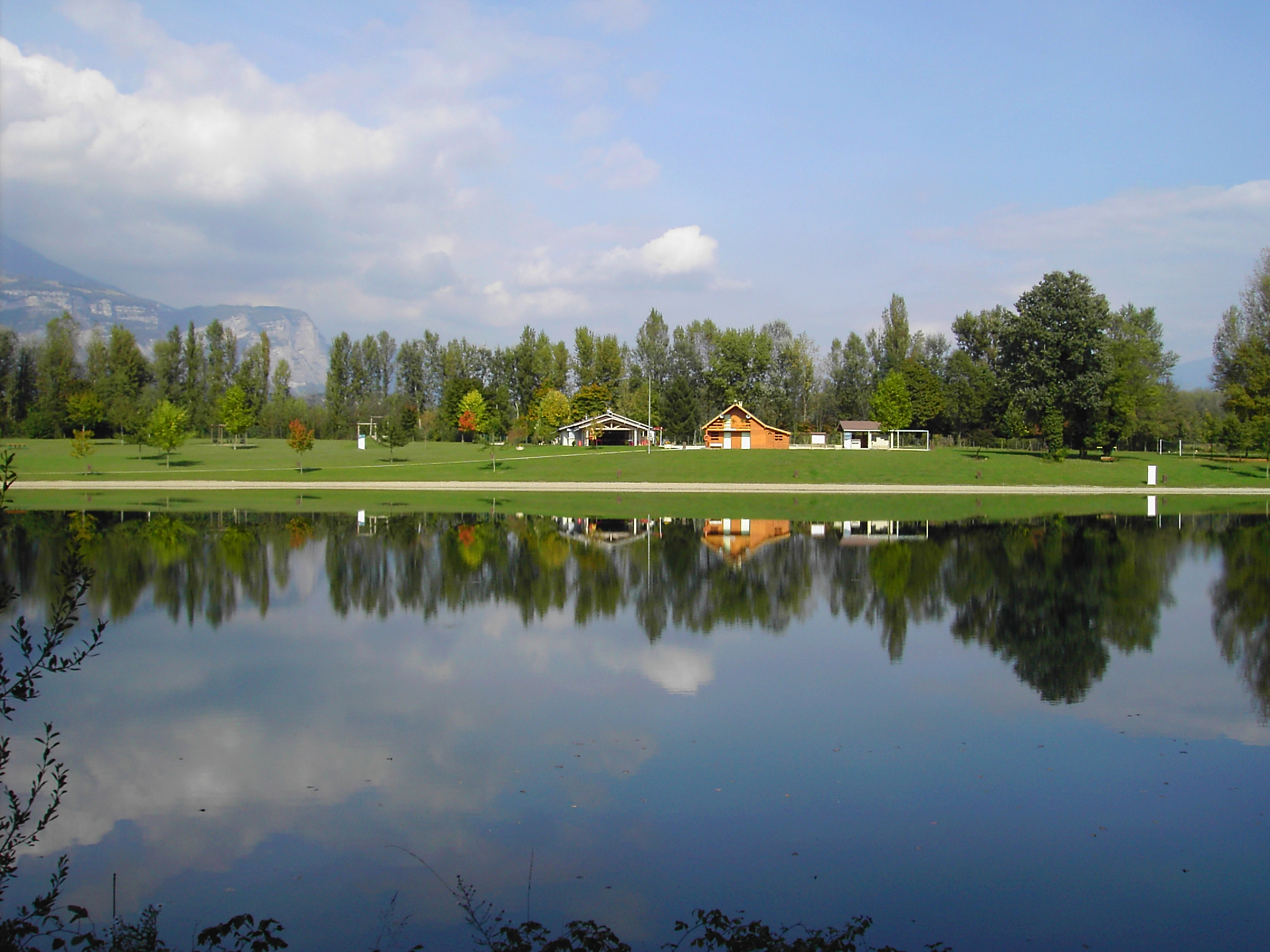
- The leisure area at Lac Taillefer

- Coat of arms
- Location of Saint-Ismier
- Location within France Location within Auvergne-Rhône-Alpes
- Coordinates: 45°14′58″N 5°49′29″E
- Country: France
- Region: Auvergne-Rhône-Alpes
- Department: Isère
- Arrondissement: Grenoble
- Canton: Le Moyen Grésivaudan
- Intercommunality: CC Le Grésivaudan

Government
  - Mayor (2020–2026): Henri Baile
- Area^{1}: 14.90 km^{2} (5.75 sq mi)
- Highest elevation: 1,489 m (4,885 ft)
- Lowest elevation: 216 m (709 ft)
- Population (2023): 7,165
  - Density: 480.9/km^{2} (1,245/sq mi)
- Time zone: UTC+01:00 (CET)
  - Summer (DST): UTC+02:00 (CEST)
- INSEE/Postal code: 38397 /38330
- ^{1} French Land Register data, which excludes lakes, ponds, glaciers > 1 km^{2} (0.386 sq mi or 247 acres) and river estuaries.

Saint-Ismier (French pronunciation: [sɛ̃.t‿imje]) is a commune in the Isère department in southeastern France. It is part of the Grenoble urban unit (agglomeration).

== Population ==
Historical population

Year	Pop.	±% p.a.
1793	1,107	—
1800	1,205	+1.22%
1806	1,241	+0.49%
1821	1,538	+1.44%
1831	1,325	−1.48%
1836	1,378	+0.79%
1841	1,373	−0.07%
1846	1,398	+0.36%
1851	1,380	−0.26%
1856	1,358	−0.32%
1861	1,364	+0.09%
1866	1,403	+0.57%
1872	1,343	−0.73%
1876	1,360	+0.31%
1881	1,365	+0.07%
1886	1,349	−0.24%
1891	1,279	−1.06%
1896	1,145	−2.19%
1901	1,091	−0.96%

Year	Pop.	±% p.a.
1906	1,085	−0.11%
1911	1,066	−0.35%
1921	1,061	−0.05%
1926	997	−1.24%
1931	968	−0.59%
1936	965	−0.06%
1946	959	−0.06%
1954	1,219	+3.04%
1962	1,185	−0.35%
1968	1,687	+6.06%
1975	3,085	+9.01%
1982	4,472	+5.45%
1990	5,292	+2.13%
1999	5,935	+1.28%
2007	6,220	+0.59%
2012	6,549	+1.04%
2017	6,966	+1.24%
2023	7,165	+0.47%

Source: EHESS and INSEE (1968-2023)

== Twin towns ==
It is twinned with the English town of Stroud in Gloucestershire.

== See also ==
- Communes of the Isère department
