= Bernin =

- Commune
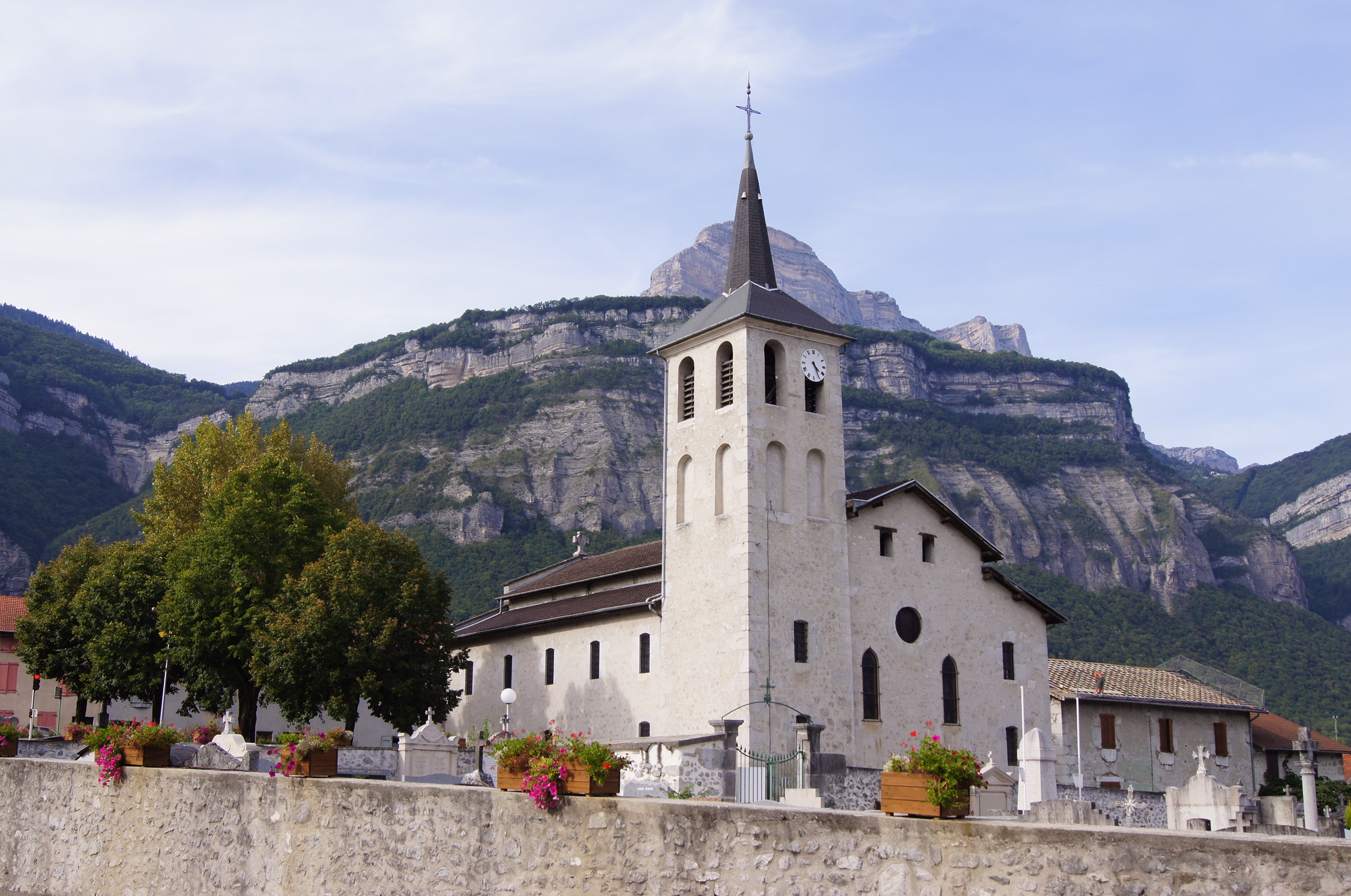
- The church of Bernin

- Coat of arms
- Location of Bernin
- Location within France Location within Auvergne-Rhône-Alpes
- Coordinates: 45°16′10″N 5°51′56″E
- Country: France
- Region: Auvergne-Rhône-Alpes
- Department: Isère
- Arrondissement: Grenoble
- Canton: Le Moyen Grésivaudan
- Intercommunality: CC Le Grésivaudan

Government
  - Mayor (2020–2026): Anne-Françoise Besson
- Area^{1}: 7.67 km^{2} (2.96 sq mi)
- Elevation: 240 m (790 ft)
- Highest elevation: 1,200 m (3,900 ft)
- Lowest elevation: 219 m (719 ft)
- Population (2023): 3,334
  - Density: 435/km^{2} (1,130/sq mi)
- Time zone: UTC+01:00 (CET)
  - Summer (DST): UTC+02:00 (CEST)
- INSEE/Postal code: 38039 /38190
- ^{1} French Land Register data, which excludes lakes, ponds, glaciers > 1 km^{2} (0.386 sq mi or 247 acres) and river estuaries.

Bernin (French pronunciation: [bɛʁnɛ̃]) is a commune in the Isère department in southeastern France.

== Population ==
Historical population
Year	Pop.	±% p.a.
1968	964	—
1975	1,353	+4.96%
1982	1,973	+5.54%
1990	2,473	+2.86%
1999	2,902	+1.79%
2007	3,007	+0.45%
2012	2,967	−0.27%
2017	3,072	+0.70%
2023	3,334	+1.37%
Source: INSEE

== Twin towns ==
Bernin is twinned with:

- Kieselbronn, Germany, since 1987

== See also ==
- Communes of the Isère department
