= Villard-Bonnot =

- Commune
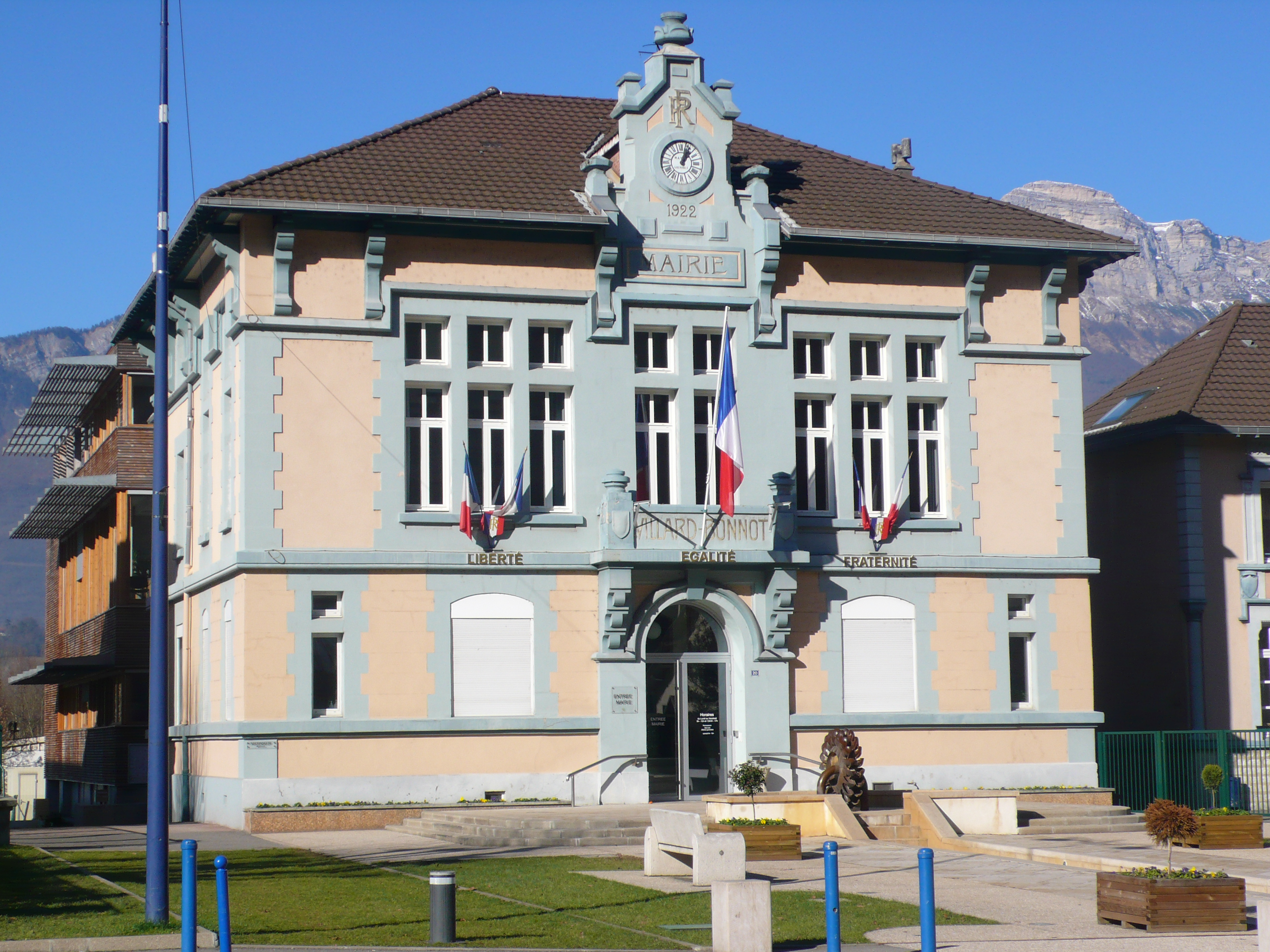
- Town hall

- Coat of arms
- Location of Villard-Bonnot
- Location within France Location within Auvergne-Rhône-Alpes
- Coordinates: 45°14′20″N 5°53′21″E
- Country: France
- Region: Auvergne-Rhône-Alpes
- Department: Isère
- Arrondissement: Grenoble
- Canton: Le Moyen Grésivaudan
- Intercommunality: CC Le Grésivaudan

Government
  - Mayor (2020–2026): Patrick Beau
- Area^{1}: 5.84 km^{2} (2.25 sq mi)
- Elevation: 235 m (771 ft)
- Highest elevation: 448 m (1,470 ft)
- Lowest elevation: 218 m (715 ft)
- Population (2023): 7,509
  - Density: 1,290/km^{2} (3,330/sq mi)
- Time zone: UTC+01:00 (CET)
  - Summer (DST): UTC+02:00 (CEST)
- INSEE/Postal code: 38547 /38190
- ^{1} French Land Register data, which excludes lakes, ponds, glaciers > 1 km^{2} (0.386 sq mi or 247 acres) and river estuaries.

Villard-Bonnot (French pronunciation: [vilˈaʁ bɔnˈo]) is a commune in the Isère department in southeastern France. It is part of the Grenoble urban unit (agglomeration).

== Population ==
Historical population

| Year | Pop. | ±% p.a. |
|---|---|---|
| 1793 | 698 | — |
| 1800 | 790 | +1.78% |
| 1806 | 878 | +1.78% |
| 1821 | 842 | −0.28% |
| 1831 | 1,013 | +1.87% |
| 1836 | 1,071 | +1.12% |
| 1841 | 1,019 | −0.99% |
| 1846 | 1,051 | +0.62% |
| 1851 | 1,045 | −0.11% |
| 1856 | 981 | −1.26% |
| 1861 | 1,073 | +1.81% |
| 1866 | 1,003 | −1.34% |
| 1872 | 1,022 | +0.31% |
| 1876 | 1,153 | +3.06% |
| 1881 | 1,333 | +2.94% |
| 1886 | 1,565 | +3.26% |
| 1891 | 1,940 | +4.39% |
| 1896 | 2,100 | +1.60% |
| 1901 | 2,316 | +1.98% |

| Year | Pop. | ±% p.a. |
|---|---|---|
| 1906 | 2,595 | +2.30% |
| 1911 | 3,199 | +4.27% |
| 1921 | 5,045 | +4.66% |
| 1926 | 5,442 | +1.53% |
| 1931 | 5,654 | +0.77% |
| 1936 | 4,961 | −2.58% |
| 1946 | 4,820 | −0.29% |
| 1954 | 5,810 | +2.36% |
| 1962 | 6,499 | +1.41% |
| 1968 | 6,375 | −0.32% |
| 1975 | 6,031 | −0.79% |
| 1982 | 6,039 | +0.02% |
| 1990 | 6,382 | +0.69% |
| 1999 | 6,904 | +0.88% |
| 2007 | 7,304 | +0.71% |
| 2012 | 7,325 | +0.06% |
| 2017 | 7,107 | −0.60% |
| 2023 | 7,509 | +0.92% |

Source: EHESS and INSEE (1968-2023)

== See also ==
- Communes of the Isère department
