= Sainte-Agnès, Isère =

Sainte-Agnès
- Commune
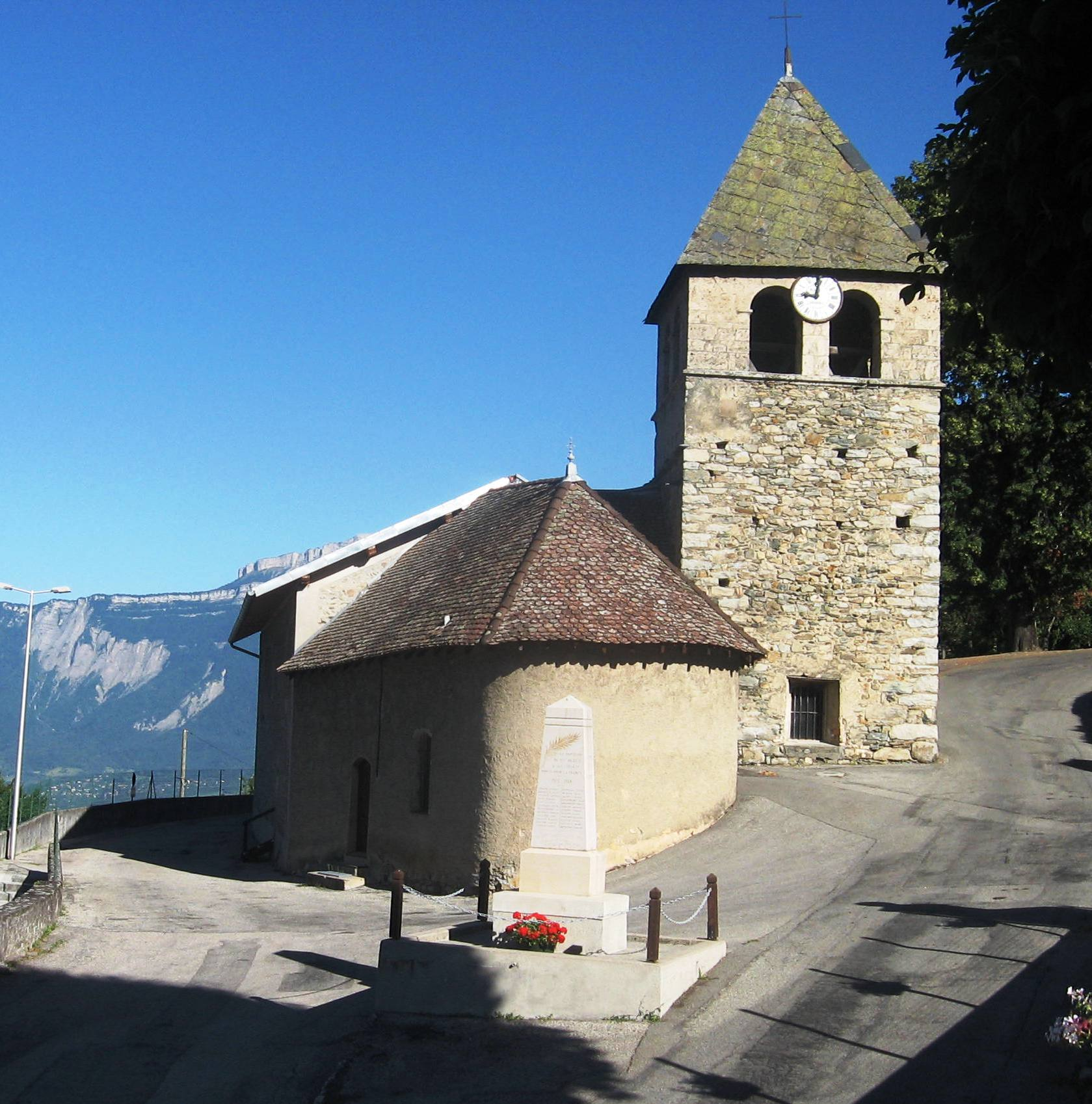
- The church in Sainte-Agnès
- Location of Sainte-Agnès
- Location within France Location within Auvergne-Rhône-Alpes
- Coordinates: 45°14′10″N 5°55′29″E
- Country: France
- Region: Auvergne-Rhône-Alpes
- Department: Isère
- Arrondissement: Grenoble
- Canton: Le Moyen Grésivaudan
- Intercommunality: CC Le Grésivaudan

Government
  - Mayor (2020–2026): Richard Latarge
- Area^{1}: 27 km^{2} (10 sq mi)
- Elevation: 730 m (2,400 ft)
- Highest elevation: 2,978 m (9,770 ft)
- Lowest elevation: 270 m (890 ft)
- Population (2023): 548
  - Density: 20/km^{2} (53/sq mi)
- Time zone: UTC+01:00 (CET)
  - Summer (DST): UTC+02:00 (CEST)
- INSEE/Postal code: 38350 /38190
- ^{1} French Land Register data, which excludes lakes, ponds, glaciers > 1 km^{2} (0.386 sq mi or 247 acres) and river estuaries.

Sainte-Agnès (French pronunciation: [sɛ̃t aɲɛs]) is a commune in the Isère department in southeastern France.

== Population ==
Historical population
Year	Pop.	±% p.a.
1968	241	—
1975	228	−0.79%
1982	308	+4.39%
1990	406	+3.51%
1999	455	+1.27%
2007	521	+1.71%
2012	541	+0.76%
2017	563	+0.80%
2023	548	−0.45%
Source: INSEE

== See also ==
- Communes of the Isère department
