= Saint-Jean-le-Vieux, Isère =

Saint-Jean-le-Vieux
- Commune
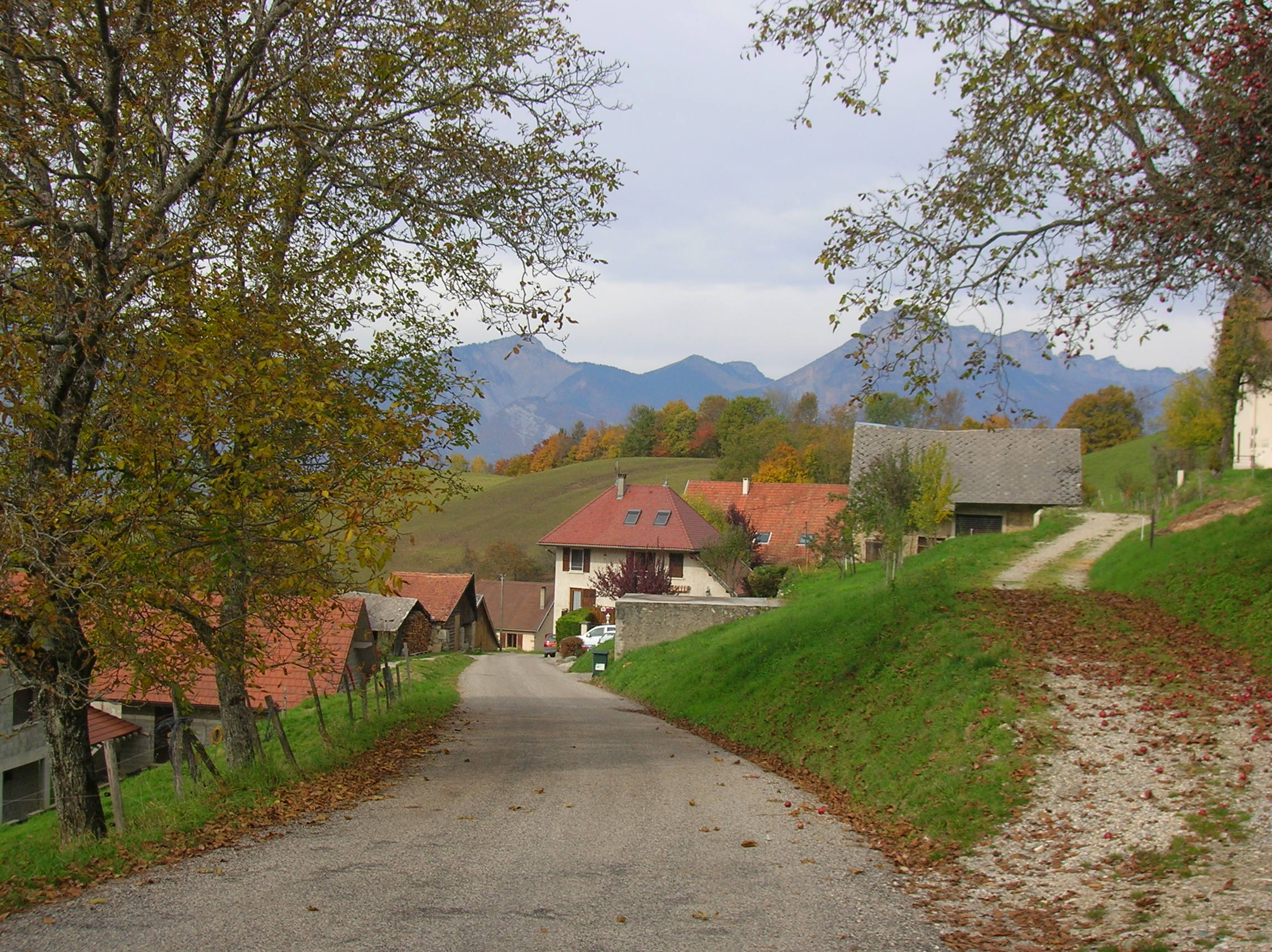
- A general view of Saint-Jean-le-Vieux
- Location of Saint-Jean-le-Vieux
- Location within France Location within Auvergne-Rhône-Alpes
- Coordinates: 45°12′00″N 5°53′00″E
- Country: France
- Region: Auvergne-Rhône-Alpes
- Department: Isère
- Arrondissement: Grenoble
- Canton: Le Moyen Grésivaudan
- Intercommunality: CC Le Grésivaudan

Government
  - Mayor (2020–2026): Franck Rebuffet-Giraud
- Area^{1}: 5 km^{2} (1.9 sq mi)
- Elevation: 702 m (2,303 ft)
- Highest elevation: 1,169 m (3,835 ft)
- Lowest elevation: 313 m (1,027 ft)
- Population (2023): 280
  - Density: 56/km^{2} (150/sq mi)
- Time zone: UTC+01:00 (CET)
  - Summer (DST): UTC+02:00 (CEST)
- INSEE/Postal code: 38404 /38420
- ^{1} French Land Register data, which excludes lakes, ponds, glaciers > 1 km^{2} (0.386 sq mi or 247 acres) and river estuaries.

Saint-Jean-le-Vieux (French pronunciation: [sɛ̃ ʒɑ̃ lə vjø]) is a commune in the Isère department in southeastern France.

== Population ==
Historical population
Year	Pop.	±% p.a.
1968	104	—
1975	99	−0.70%
1982	149	+6.01%
1990	173	+1.88%
1999	203	+1.79%
2007	218	+0.90%
2012	257	+3.35%
2017	292	+2.59%
2023	280	−0.70%
Source: INSEE

== See also ==
- Communes of the Isère department
