= Communailles-en-Montagne =

- Part of Mignovillard
- Location of Communailles-en-Montagne
- Location within France Location within Bourgogne-Franche-Comté
- Coordinates: 46°48′39″N 6°05′55″E
- Country: France
- Region: Bourgogne-Franche-Comté
- Department: Jura
- Arrondissement: Lons-le-Saunier
- Canton: Saint-Laurent-en-Grandvaux
- Commune: Mignovillard
- Area^{1}: 4.01 km^{2} (1.55 sq mi)
- Highest elevation: 888 m (2,913 ft)
- Lowest elevation: 770 m (2,530 ft)
- Population (2017): 54
  - Density: 13/km^{2} (35/sq mi)
- Time zone: UTC+01:00 (CET)
  - Summer (DST): UTC+02:00 (CEST)
- Postal code: 39250
- ^{1} French Land Register data, which excludes lakes, ponds, glaciers > 1 km^{2} (0.386 sq mi or 247 acres) and river estuaries.

Communailles-en-Montagne (French pronunciation: [kɔmynaj ɑ̃ mɔ̃taɲ]; Arpitan: Koem'neillè) is a former commune in the Jura department in Bourgogne-Franche-Comté in eastern France. On 1 January 2016, it was merged into the commune of Mignovillard.

== Population ==
Historical population

Year	Pop.	±%
1793	164	—
1806	171	+4.3%
1821	188	+9.9%
1831	208	+10.6%
1841	222	+6.7%
1851	213	−4.1%
1861	204	−4.2%
1872	167	−18.1%
1881	134	−19.8%
1891	128	−4.5%
1901	121	−5.5%
1911	103	−14.9%

Year	Pop.	±%
1921	120	+16.5%
1931	113	−5.8%
1946	89	−21.2%
1954	74	−16.9%
1962	57	−23.0%
1968	45	−21.1%
1975	39	−13.3%
1982	40	+2.6%
1990	38	−5.0%
1999	42	+10.5%
2006	52	+23.8%
2012	45	−13.5%

== See also ==
- Communes of the Jura department
