= Jurassien dialect =

Dialect of Franco-Provençal spoken in Eastern France

Jurassien
- Native to: France
- Region: Jura
- Language family: Indo-European: Italic; Latino-Faliscan; Latin; Romance; Italo-Western; Western Romance; Gallo-Iberian?; Gallo-Romance; Gallo-Rhaetian?; Arpitan–Oïl; Franco-Provençal; Jurassien
- Writing system: Latin

Language codes
- ISO 639-3: None (mis)
- Glottolog: None

Jurassien is a dialect of Franco-Provençal spoken in the southern part of Franche-Comté, especially in the Jura Mountains and the Jura department of eastern France.

The term jurassien is sometimes also used for Franc-Comtois, an Oïl dialect spoken in northern Franche-Comté and in the canton of Jura in Switzerland.

== Area ==
Jurassien belongs to the Franco-Provençal linguistic area. It covers much of the Jura department, excluding the area around Dole, and is notably associated with the region of Lons-le-Saunier. The southern half of the Doubs department uses a related dialect, Burgondan.

== Studies ==
Jurassien, like neighboring regional languages and dialects, was the subject of several studies in the 19th and 20th centuries. Joseph Thévenin studied the patois of Le Vaudioux in 1898, Léon Bourgeois-Moine studied that of La Chapelle-des-Bois in 1894, and Oskar Kjellén studied the region of Nozeroy in 1945.

One of the most important later works was the 1979 Glossaire du parler haut-jurassien, by Paul Duraffourg, Alice and Roland Janod, Cathie Lorge and André Vuillermoz. In 1994, the poet Patrick Simon published Le parler du Jura. In 1995, Jacqueline Robez-Ferraris published a study of Jurassien and of the particularities of French spoken in the Morez region of the Haut-Jura.

== Orthography ==
There is no common orthography and no unified Jurassien dialect. However, certain features are common to several local speech varieties. French g and j often become dz, French ch becomes ts, and s sometimes becomes ch. For example, French jour, “day”, corresponds to dze at Salins, and French chien, “dog”, corresponds to tsin at Mignovillard.

Masculine singular words ending in French -e often end in -ou in Jurassien; feminine forms may end in -o or -a. In many cases, plural words do not end in French -es, but in -et.

== Grammar ==
At Salins, two groups of verbs are distinguished: the French first-group ending -er becomes -i or remains -er, as in oster, “to buy”, and martsi, “to walk”. The second and third groups do not follow a regular pattern.

At La Chapelle-des-Bois, Léon Bourgeois-Moine distinguished four conjugations: endings in -er, corresponding to the French first group; -i, corresponding to French verbs in -ir and -er; -ae, corresponding to French verbs in -oir; and -re, as in French.

== Literature ==
Jurassien has a limited written literature. Unlike Franc-Comtois, it no longer has active authors writing in the dialect. Among the most significant texts are the Christmas songs of Arbois, reported by Max-Buchon and J. L. Billot, and especially the tale of Vise-lou-Bu.

Vise-lou-Bu is probably the best-known tale in Jurassien literature. It tells the story of a Jurassien from La Chapelle-des-Bois who joins the king's army and gains honour in battle. The story is said to take place in 1721, during fighting between the French and Emperor Charles VI near Schlettstadt, now Sélestat. It is based on a real person, Claude-Antoine Pagnier-Bezet (1693–1779), and may have been written by Abbé Blondeau in 1781, according to Léon Bourgeois.

== See also ==
- Franco-Provençal
- Franc-Comtois
- Jura (department)
