= Siévoz =

- Commune
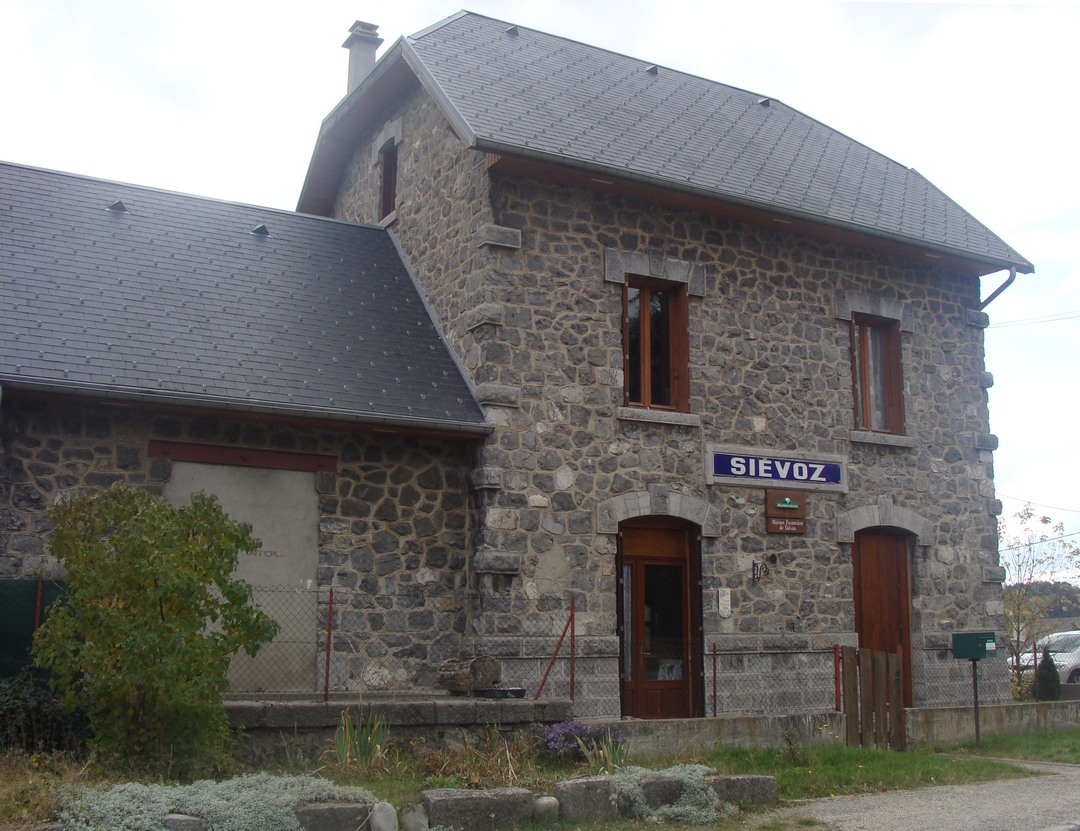
- Train station
- Location of Siévoz
- Location within France Location within Auvergne-Rhône-Alpes
- Coordinates: 44°54′15″N 5°50′18″E
- Country: France
- Region: Auvergne-Rhône-Alpes
- Department: Isère
- Arrondissement: Grenoble
- Canton: Matheysine-Trièves

Government
  - Mayor (2020–2026): Dominique Le Traou
- Area^{1}: 7.37 km^{2} (2.85 sq mi)
- Elevation: 800 m (2,600 ft)
- Highest elevation: 1,605 m (5,266 ft)
- Lowest elevation: 582 m (1,909 ft)
- Population (2023): 132
  - Density: 17.9/km^{2} (46.4/sq mi)
- Time zone: UTC+01:00 (CET)
  - Summer (DST): UTC+02:00 (CEST)
- INSEE/Postal code: 38489 /38350
- ^{1} French Land Register data, which excludes lakes, ponds, glaciers > 1 km^{2} (0.386 sq mi or 247 acres) and river estuaries.

Siévoz (French pronunciation: [sjevo]) is a commune in the Isère department in southeastern France.

== Toponymy ==
As with many polysyllabic Arpitan toponyms or anthroponyms, the final -x marks oxytonic stress (on the last syllable), whereas the final -z indicates paroxytonic stress (on the penultimate syllable) and should not be pronounced, although in French it is often mispronounced due to hypercorrection.

== Population ==
Historical population
| Year | Pop. | ±% p.a. |
|---|---|---|
| 1968 | 140 | — |
| 1975 | 107 | −3.77% |
| 1982 | 102 | −0.68% |
| 1990 | 102 | +0.00% |
| 1999 | 116 | +1.44% |
| 2007 | 130 | +1.43% |
| 2012 | 122 | −1.26% |
| 2017 | 136 | +2.20% |
| 2023 | 132 | −0.50% |
Source: INSEE

== See also ==
- Communes of the Isère department
