= Carema DOC =

Italian white wine

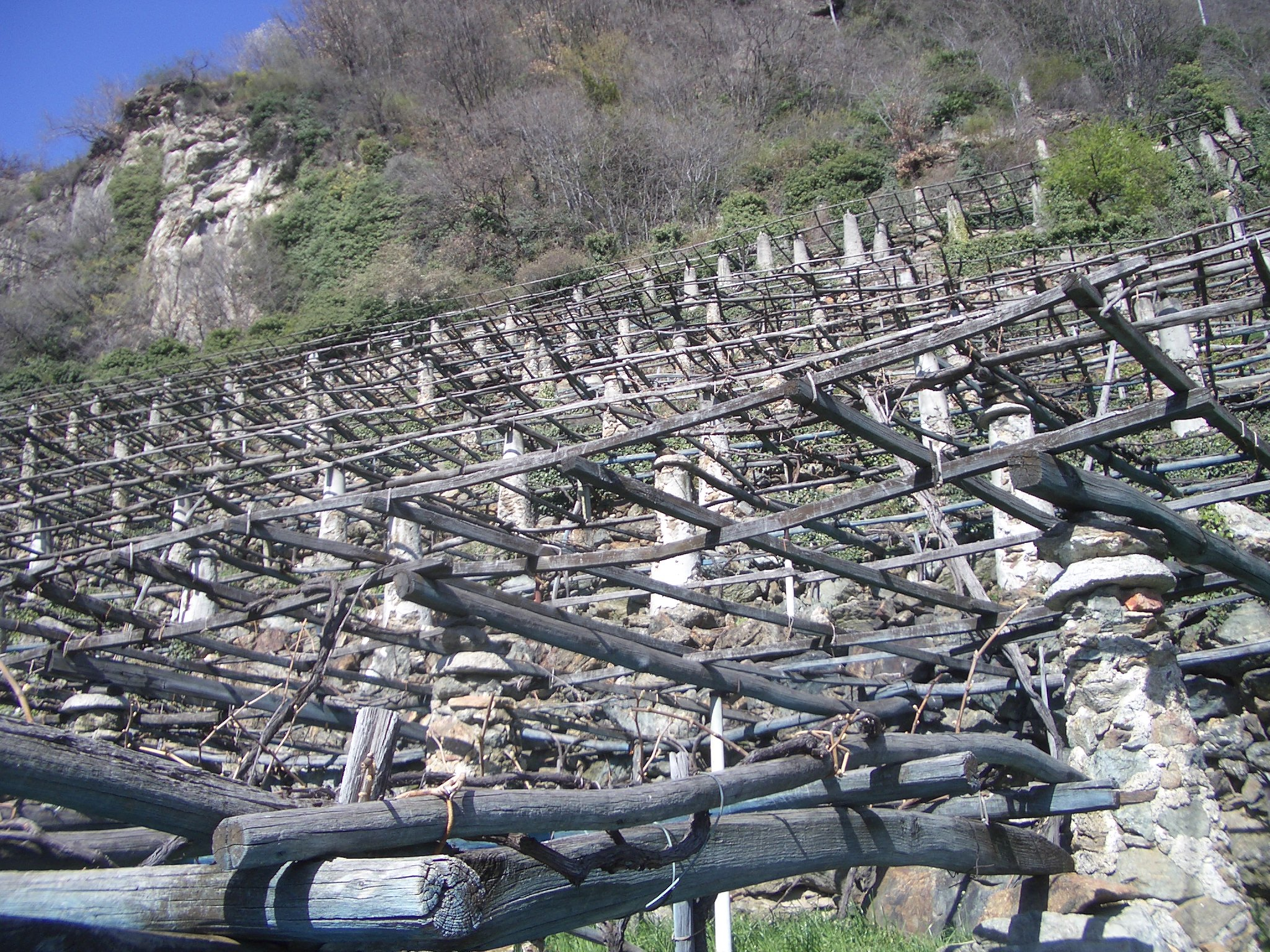
Typical Carema terraced vineyards

Carema is a red DOC wine produced in the village of Carema in Piedmont, near the border with the Aosta Valley, in northern Italy.

The wine is made primarily from Nebbiolo grapes, traditionally cultivated in terraced vineyards built on steep Alpine slopes.

== History ==
The wine received DOC status in 1967.

== Wine region ==
The production area of Carema DOC is restricted to the territory of the comune of Carema, in Piedmont. It lies at the entrance to the Aosta Valley, at the northern end of the Canavese country. The vineyards occupy the steep slopes at the foot of Mount Maletto, generally between 350 and 700 metres above sea level. The terrain is characterised by morainic soils and extensive terraces supported by dry-stone walls.

A distinctive feature of the Carema vineyard landscape is the traditional training system of the pergola canavesana. The vines are trained over pergolas, known as tupiun, supported by columns made of stone and lime, called pilun, which are topped with flat circular stone slabs. The structures help support the vines while also retaining and releasing the heat accumulated during the day, mitigating the Alpine climate and the significant temperature variations.

== Types ==
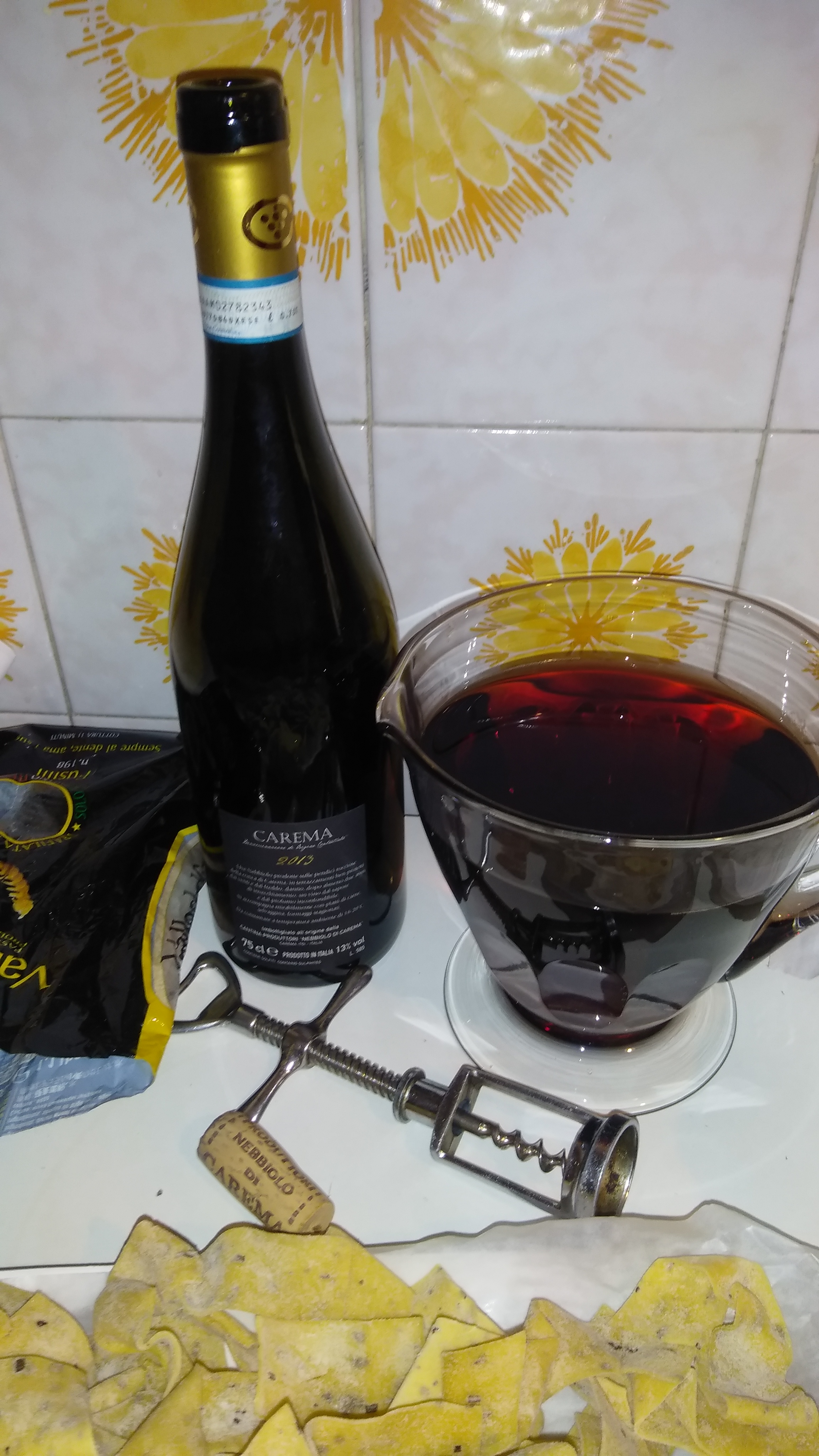
Carema wine bottle

Carema wines are generally ruby red, developing garnet hues with age. Their aromatic profile is reminiscent of macerated roses, spices and dried fruit, while their taste is soft, velvety and full-bodied.

The designation recognises two types of Carema wine: the Carema DOC and the Carema DOC Riserva.

The Carema DOC is the standard denomination. It must contain at least 85% Nebbiolo grapes, with up to 15% permitted from other non-aromatic red grape varieties authorised in Piedmont. It requires a minimum ageing period of two years, including at least one year in wooden vessels.

The Carema DOC Riserva is a more extensively aged version of the wine. It requires a minimum ageing period of three years.

== See also ==
- Erbaluce di Caluso
