= Carema =

Carema Karéma (Arpitan) Caèima (Valdôtain) Kwarusunh (Walser)
- Comune
- Comune di Carema
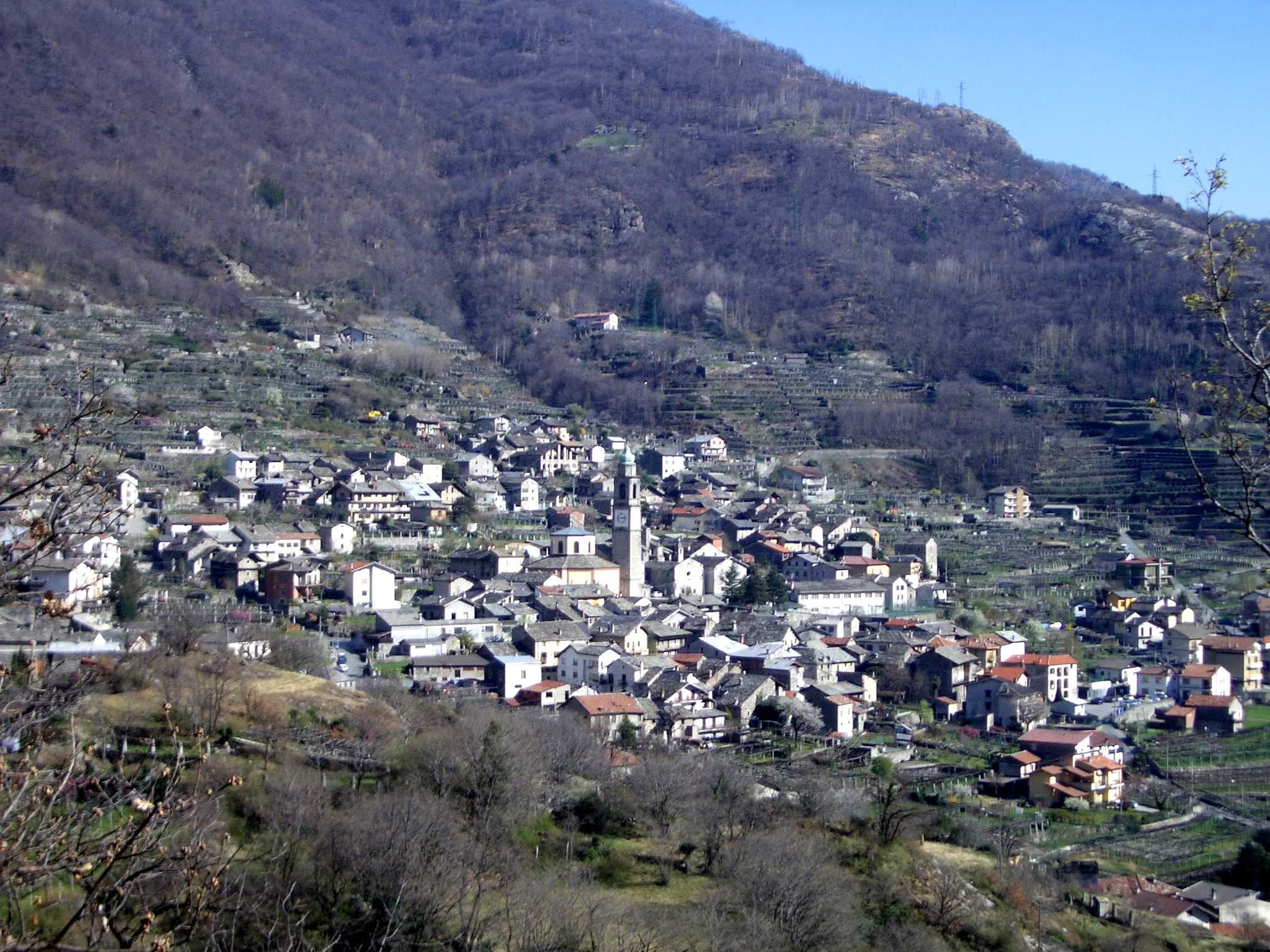

- Coat of arms

- Location within Italy Location within Piedmont
- Coordinates: 45°35′N 7°49′E
- Country: Italy
- Region: Piedmont
- Metropolitan city: Turin (TO)

Government
  - Mayor: Giovanni Aldighieri

Area
  - Total: 10.26 km^{2} (3.96 sq mi)
- Elevation: 349 m (1,145 ft)

Population (1-1-2017)
  - Total: 795
  - Density: 77.5/km^{2} (201/sq mi)
- Demonym: Caremese(i)
- Time zone: UTC+1 (CET)
  - Summer (DST): UTC+2 (CEST)
- Postal code: 10010
- Dialing code: 0125

Carema (Arpitan: Karéma, Valdôtain: Caèima, Walser: Kwarusunh) is a comune (municipality) in the Metropolitan City of Turin in the Italian region Piedmont, located about 60 kilometres (37 mi) north of Turin.

Carema borders the following municipalities: Perloz, Lillianes, Donnas, Pont-Saint-Martin, Settimo Vittone, and Quincinetto. It is home to the production of the Carema red wine.
