= Mâconnais dialect =

Dialect of Franco-Provençal

Mâconnais
- Mâconês
- Native to: France
- Region: Mâconnais
- Language family: Indo-European: Italic; Latino-Faliscan; Latin; Romance; Italo-Western; Western Romance; Gallo-Iberian?; Gallo-Romance; Gallo-Rhaetian?; Arpitan–Oïl; Franco-Provençal; Mâconnais
- Writing system: Latin

Language codes
- ISO 639-3: None (mis)
- Glottolog: None

Mâconnais (endonym: Mâconês) is a dialect of Arpitan (Franco-Provençal) spoken in the region of Mâcon, in the south of the departament of Saône-et-Loire, region of Bourgogne-Franche-Comté, France. It is a transitional dialect between the domains of Franco-Provençal and the langues d’oïl.

Due to a strong influence from French, it is sometimes classified as an oïl dialect. However, the majority of linguistic studies and institutions classify it as a Franco-Provençal variety, as is the case with the Linguasphere Observatory.

Medieval and modern authors from Mâconnais were responsible for the development of a literary tradition in the Mâconnais dialect. These texts are regarded as writings in the Franco-Provençal language, due to the presence of a Franco-Provençal superstratum.

Although the dialect is now rarely spoken, it continues to survive through the efforts of cultural associations dedicated to preserving Burgundy's linguistic heritage. The commune of Tournus is considered to lie along the boundary between the langues d’oïl and Franco-Provençal.
