= Clux-Villeneuve =

- Commune
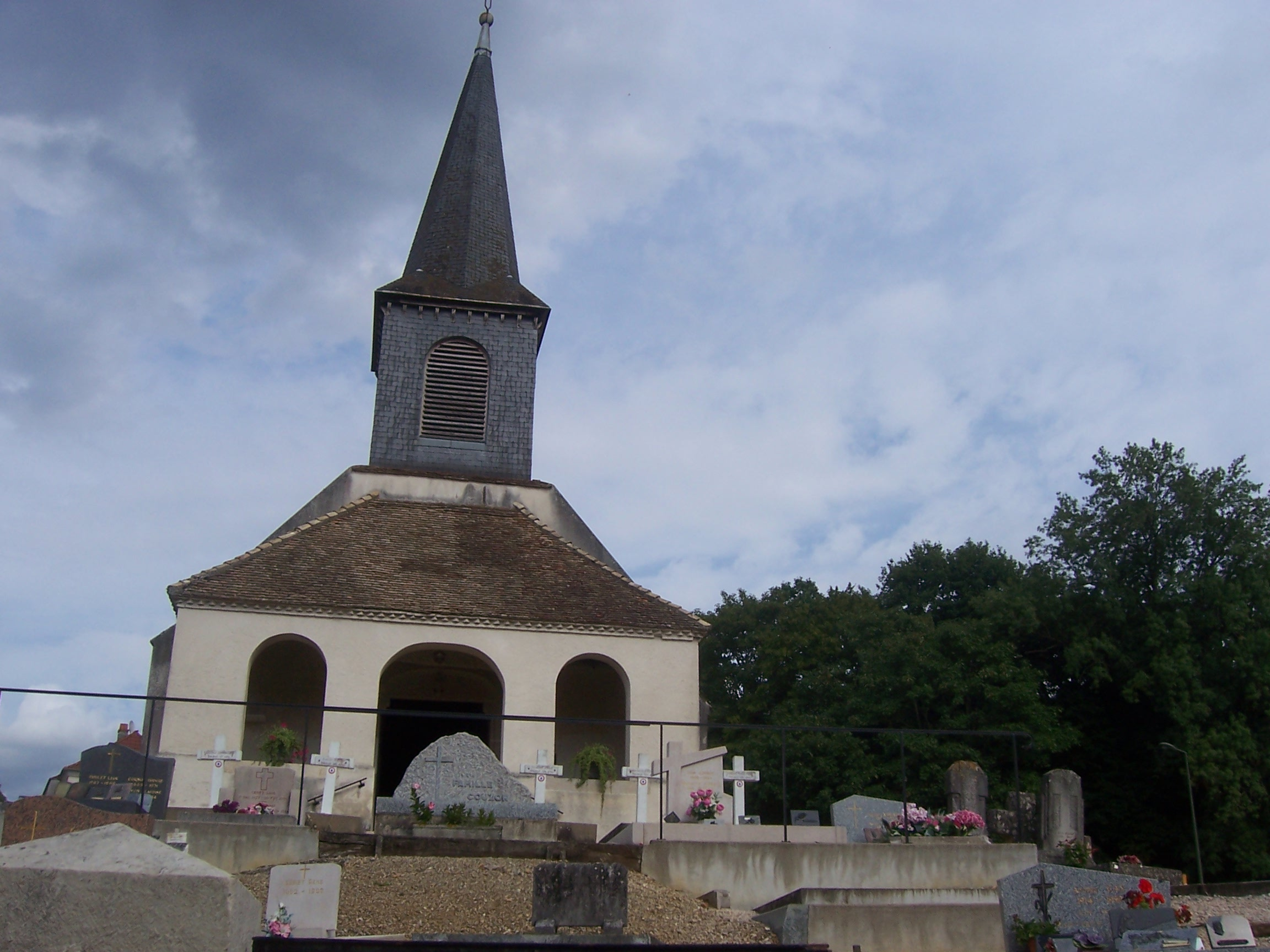
- The church in Clux-Villeneuve
- Location of Clux-Villeneuve
- Location within France Location within Bourgogne-Franche-Comté
- Coordinates: 46°57′30″N 5°10′22″E
- Country: France
- Region: Bourgogne-Franche-Comté
- Department: Saône-et-Loire
- Arrondissement: Chalon-sur-Saône
- Canton: Gergy
- Intercommunality: Saône Doubs Bresse

Government
  - Mayor (2023–2026): Jean-Luc Juillard
- Area^{1}: 15.36 km^{2} (5.93 sq mi)
- Elevation: 193 m (633 ft)
- Highest elevation: 195 m (640 ft)
- Lowest elevation: 176 m (577 ft)
- Population (2023): 303
  - Density: 19.7/km^{2} (51.1/sq mi)
- Time zone: UTC+01:00 (CET)
  - Summer (DST): UTC+02:00 (CEST)
- INSEE/Postal code: 71578 /71270
- ^{1} French Land Register data, which excludes lakes, ponds, glaciers > 1 km^{2} (0.386 sq mi or 247 acres) and river estuaries.

Clux-Villeneuve (French pronunciation: [kly vilnœv]) is a commune in the Saône-et-Loire department in the region of Bourgogne-Franche-Comté in eastern France. It is the result of the merger, on 1 January 2015, of the communes of Clux and La Villeneuve.

== See also ==
- Communes of the Saône-et-Loire department
