= Just Songeon =

French writer

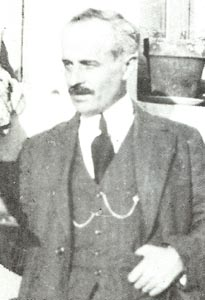
- Born: May 17, 1880; La Combe de Sillingy (Savoie), France
- Died: March 30, 1940; Paris, France
- Occupation(s): Writer, poet, teacher

Just Songeon (Just Sonjon in Savoyard) (17 May 1880 - 30 March 1940), known as le Petiôt d’la Comba, was a French writer and poet known for writing in the Savoyard dialect of the Franco-Provençal language.

== Biography ==
Songeon studied at a primary teacher training college in Bonneville, Haute-Savoie where he graduated in 1900. He lived in the town of Annemasse and was appointed as an assistant teacher at the town's Upper Primary School in 1906, where he taught writing, English and geography.

During World War I, he served with the 230th Infantry Regiment from 1914 to 1917 and as an interpreter for the US Army from 1917 to 1918.

Songeon identified as a communist and after returning from the war, he became involved in politics. During the 1920s, he campaigned for the right to teach in Savoyard, and later went on to become one of the founders of the SFIC Federation of Haute-Savoie.

Songeon died in Paris in 1940 and his ashes were returned to his birth town of La Combe de Sillingy, France, in 1976.

A compilation of his texts and poems entitled Just Songeon et le patois savoyard was published in 1980.
