= Clux =

Commune in Saône-et-Loire, France

- Part of Clux-Villeneuve
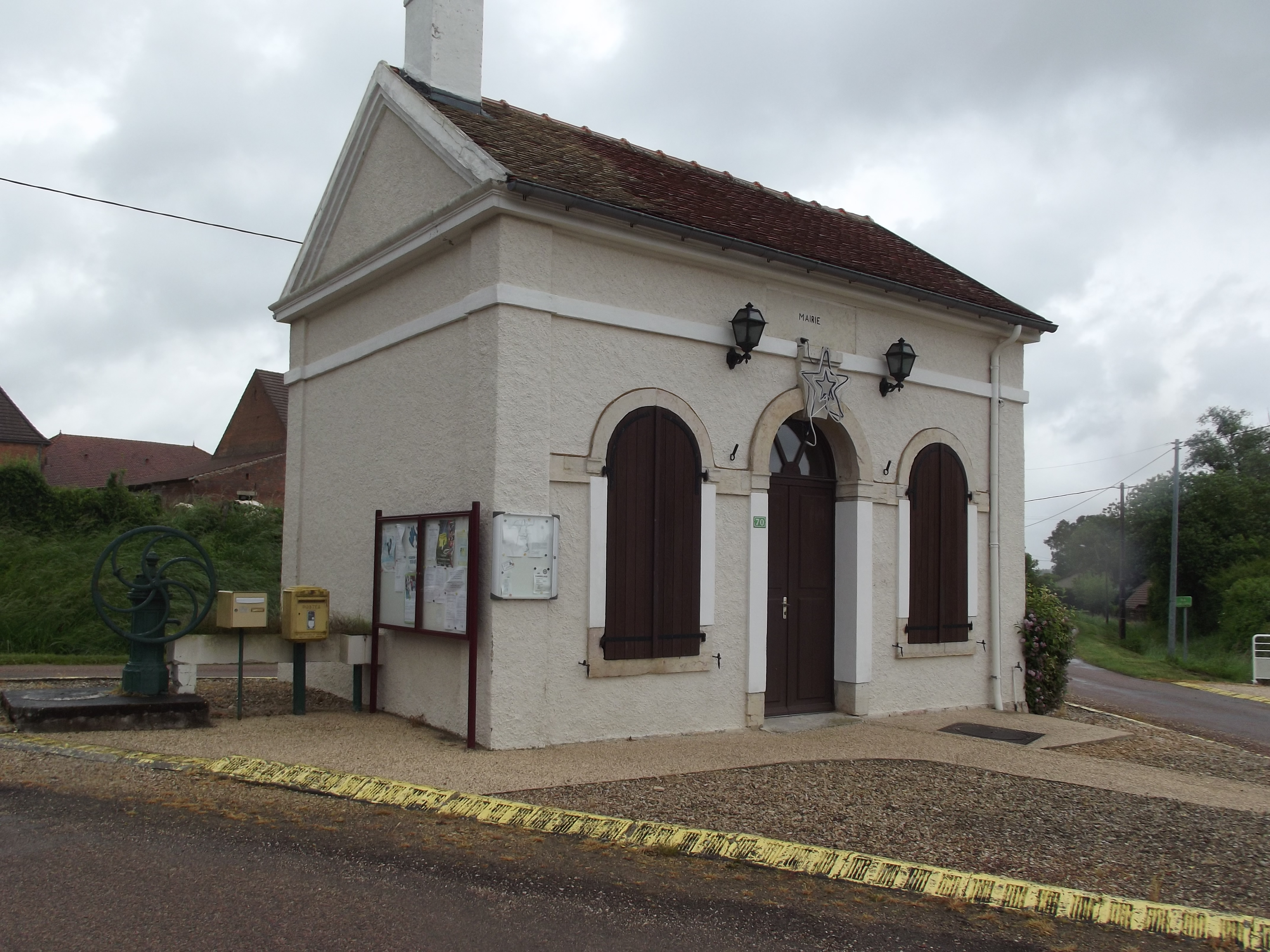
- Town hall
- Location of Clux
- Location within France Location within Bourgogne-Franche-Comté
- Coordinates: 46°57′30″N 5°11′29″E
- Country: France
- Region: Bourgogne-Franche-Comté
- Department: Saône-et-Loire
- Arrondissement: Chalon-sur-Saône
- Canton: Gergy
- Commune: Clux-Villeneuve
- Area^{1}: 8.01 km^{2} (3.09 sq mi)
- Elevation: 193 m (633 ft)
- Highest elevation: 195 m (640 ft)
- Lowest elevation: 176 m (577 ft)
- Population (2017): 115
  - Density: 14.4/km^{2} (37.2/sq mi)
- Time zone: UTC+01:00 (CET)
  - Summer (DST): UTC+02:00 (CEST)
- Postal code: 71270
- ^{1} French Land Register data, which excludes lakes, ponds, glaciers > 1 km^{2} (0.386 sq mi or 247 acres) and river estuaries.

Clux (French pronunciation: [kly]) is a former commune in the Saône-et-Loire department in the region of Bourgogne in eastern France. On 1 January 2015, Clux and La Villeneuve merged becoming one commune called Clux-Villeneuve.

== See also ==
- Communes of the Saône-et-Loire department
