= Dunière-sur-Eyrieux =

- Commune
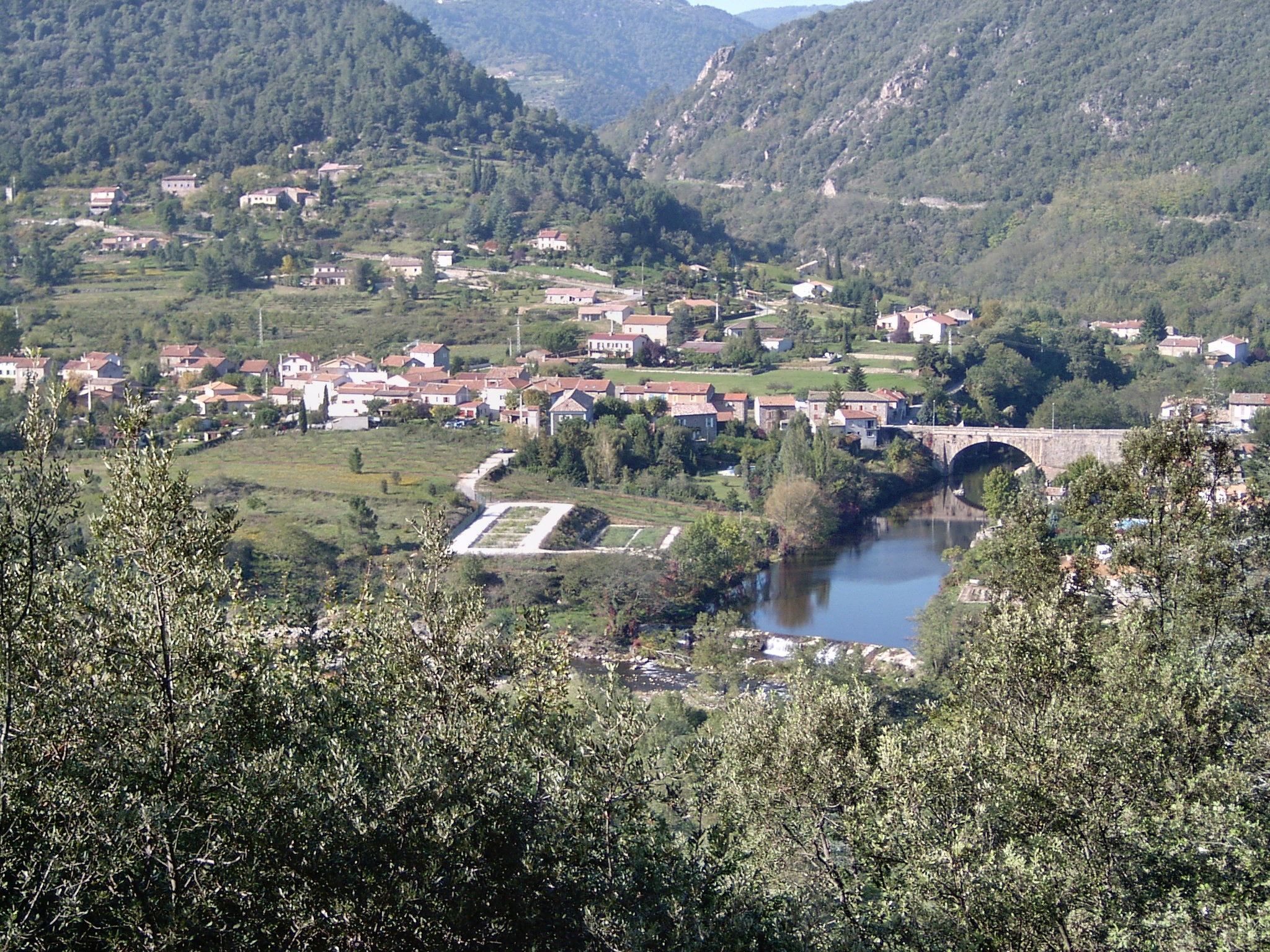
- A general view of Dunière-sur-Eyrieux
- Location of Dunière-sur-Eyrieux
- Location within France Location within Auvergne-Rhône-Alpes
- Coordinates: 44°49′24″N 4°39′33″E
- Country: France
- Region: Auvergne-Rhône-Alpes
- Department: Ardèche
- Arrondissement: Privas
- Canton: Haut-Eyrieux
- Intercommunality: CA Privas Centre Ardèche

Government
  - Mayor (2020–2026): Gérard Brosse
- Area^{1}: 7.73 km^{2} (2.98 sq mi)
- Highest elevation: 622 m (2,041 ft)
- Lowest elevation: 148 m (486 ft)
- Population (2023): 437
  - Density: 56.5/km^{2} (146/sq mi)
- Time zone: UTC+01:00 (CET)
  - Summer (DST): UTC+02:00 (CEST)
- INSEE/Postal code: 07083 /07360
- ^{1} French Land Register data, which excludes lakes, ponds, glaciers > 1 km^{2} (0.386 sq mi or 247 acres) and river estuaries.

Dunière-sur-Eyrieux (French pronunciation: [dynjɛʁ syʁ eʁjø], literally Dunière on Eyrieux; Occitan: Dunèira) is a commune in the Ardèche department in southern France.

The commune's name was changed from Dunières-sur-Eyrieux to Dunière-sur-Eyrieux (without "s") on 1 January 2001.

== Population ==
Historical population
Year	Pop.	±% p.a.
1968	430	—
1975	359	−2.55%
1982	324	−1.45%
1990	301	−0.92%
1999	324	+0.82%
2007	381	+2.05%
2012	425	+2.21%
2017	431	+0.28%
2023	437	+0.23%
Source: INSEE

== See also ==
- Communes of the Ardèche department
