= Mignovillard =

Commune in Bourgogne-Franche-Comté, France

- Commune
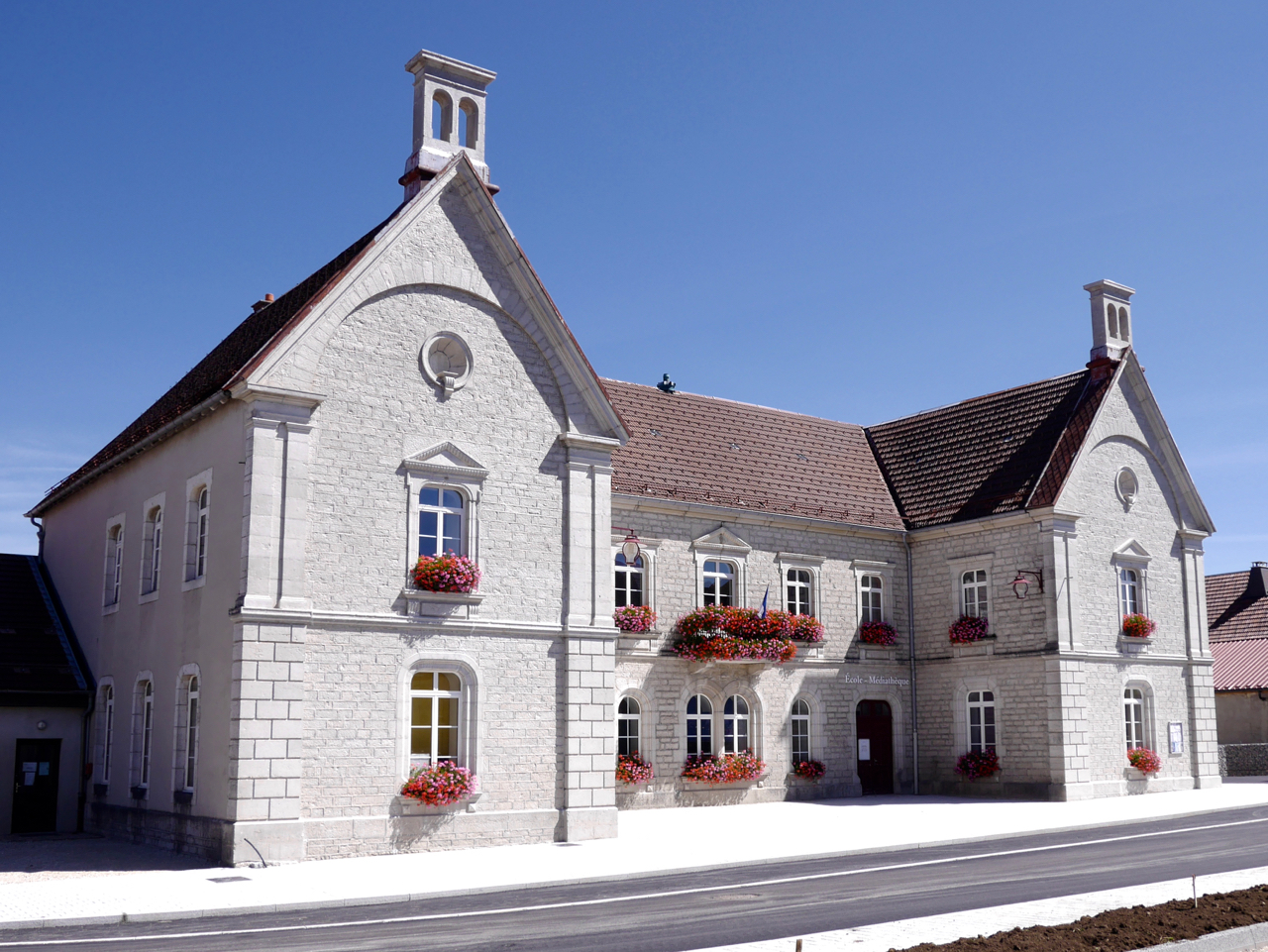
- The town hall in Mignovillard

- Coat of arms
- Location of Mignovillard
- Location within France Location within Bourgogne-Franche-Comté
- Coordinates: 46°47′29″N 6°07′36″E
- Country: France
- Region: Bourgogne-Franche-Comté
- Department: Jura
- Arrondissement: Lons-le-Saunier
- Canton: Saint-Laurent-en-Grandvaux

Government
  - Mayor (2020–2026): Florent Serrette
- Area^{1}: 53.82 km^{2} (20.78 sq mi)
- Highest elevation: 1,189 m (3,901 ft)
- Lowest elevation: 799 m (2,621 ft)
- Population (2023): 902
  - Density: 16.8/km^{2} (43.4/sq mi)
- Time zone: UTC+01:00 (CET)
  - Summer (DST): UTC+02:00 (CEST)
- INSEE/Postal code: 39331 /39250
- ^{1} French Land Register data, which excludes lakes, ponds, glaciers > 1 km^{2} (0.386 sq mi or 247 acres) and river estuaries.

Mignovillard (French pronunciation: [miɲɔvilaʁ]) is a commune in the Jura department in Bourgogne-Franche-Comté in eastern France. On 1 January 2016, the former commune of Communailles-en-Montagne was merged into Mignovillard.

== Population ==
Historical population
Year	Pop.	±% p.a.
1968	787	—
1975	754	−0.61%
1982	702	−1.02%
1990	692	−0.18%
1999	691	−0.02%
2007	679	−0.22%
2012	776	+2.71%
2017	819	+1.08%
2023	902	+1.62%
Source: INSEE

Population data refer to the area corresponding with the commune as of January 2025.

== See also ==
- Communes of the Jura department
