= Bressieux =

- Commune
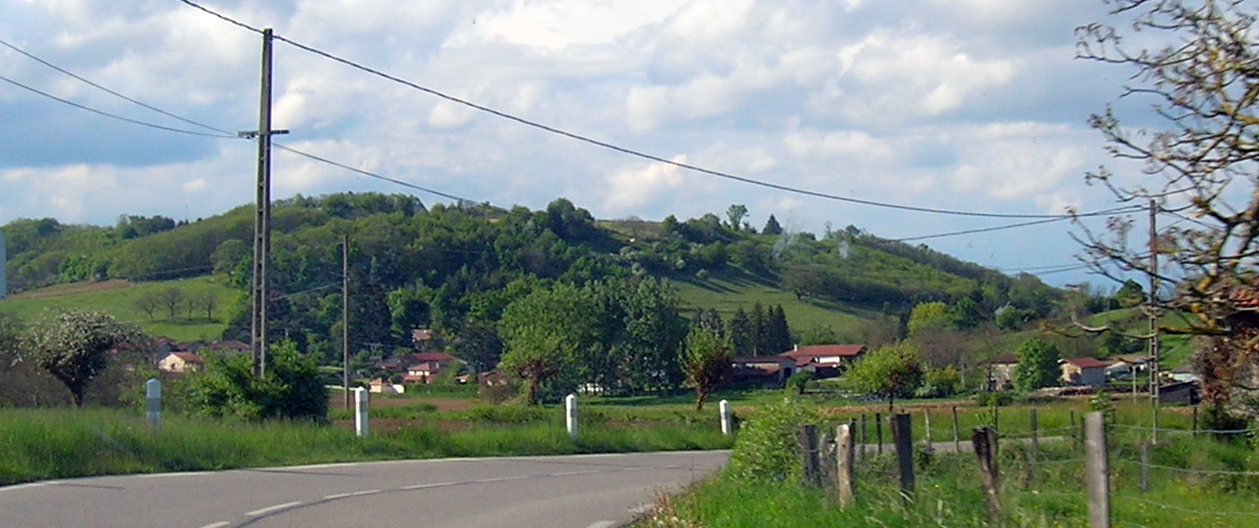
- A general view of Bressieux
- Location of Bressieux
- Location within France Location within Auvergne-Rhône-Alpes
- Coordinates: 45°19′24″N 5°16′39″E
- Country: France
- Region: Auvergne-Rhône-Alpes
- Department: Isère
- Arrondissement: Vienne
- Canton: Bièvre

Government
  - Mayor (2020–2026): Gilbert Badez
- Area^{1}: 0.8 km^{2} (0.31 sq mi)
- Elevation: 520 m (1,710 ft)
- Highest elevation: 525 m (1,722 ft)
- Lowest elevation: 395 m (1,296 ft)
- Population (2023): 93
  - Density: 120/km^{2} (300/sq mi)
- Time zone: UTC+01:00 (CET)
  - Summer (DST): UTC+02:00 (CEST)
- INSEE/Postal code: 38056 /38870
- ^{1} French Land Register data, which excludes lakes, ponds, glaciers > 1 km^{2} (0.386 sq mi or 247 acres) and river estuaries.

Bressieux (French pronunciation: [bʁɛsjø]) is a commune in the Isère department in southeastern France.

== Population ==
Historical population

Year	Pop.	±% p.a.
1800	208	—
1821	245	+0.78%
1841	183	−1.45%
1861	94	−3.28%
1881	102	+0.41%
1901	94	−0.41%
1921	65	−1.83%
1931	53	−2.02%
1946	33	−3.11%
1962	69	+4.72%

Year	Pop.	±% p.a.
1968	70	+0.24%
1975	76	+1.18%
1982	109	+5.29%
1990	96	−1.57%
1999	89	−0.84%
2007	86	−0.43%
2012	87	+0.23%
2017	93	+1.34%
2023	93	+0.00%

Source: EHESS and INSEE

== See also ==
- Communes of the Isère department
