= Crémieu =

Crémieu Crèmiœ (Arpitan)
- Commune
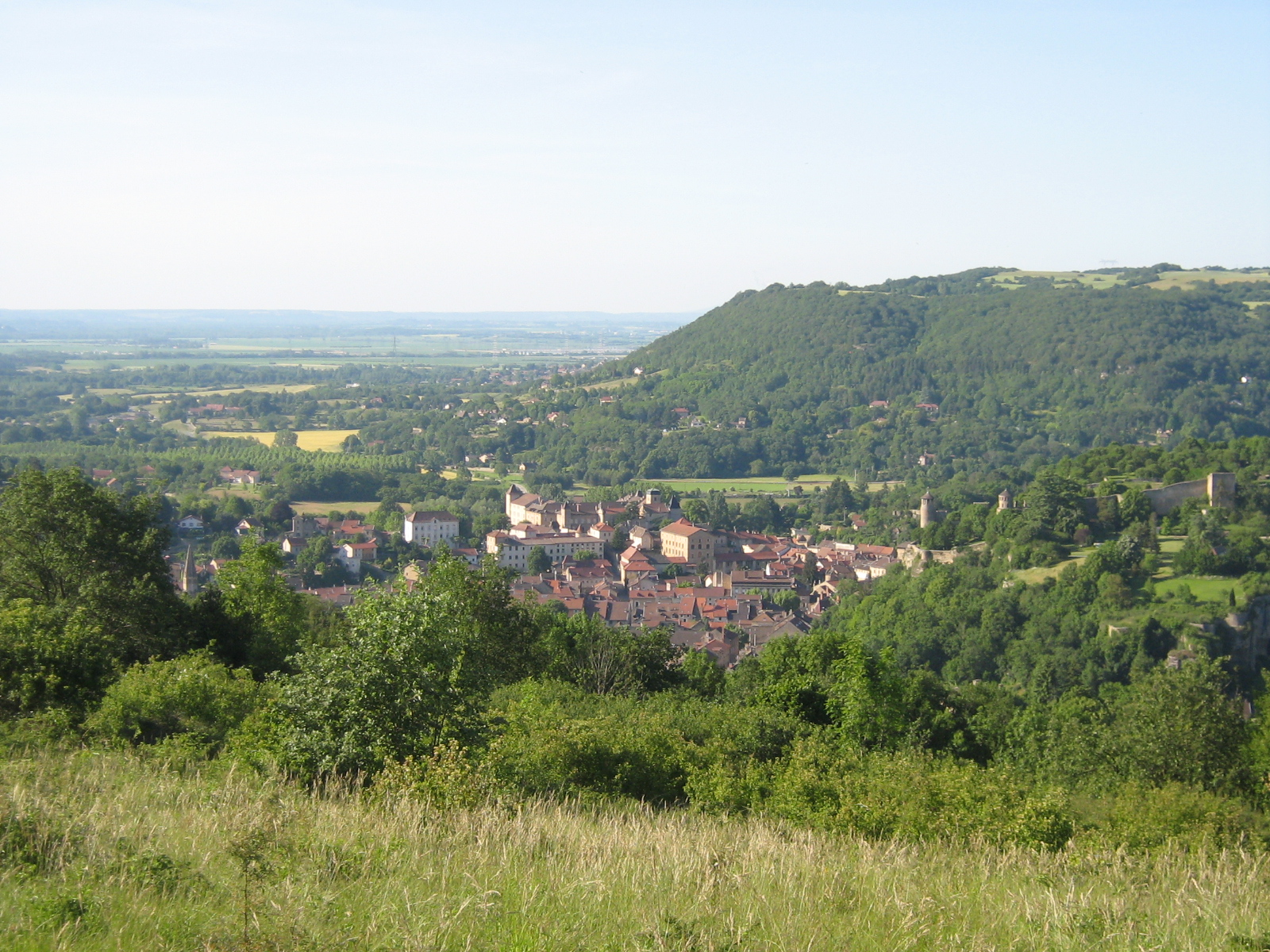
- A general view of Crémieu

- Coat of arms
- Location of Crémieu
- Location within France Location within Auvergne-Rhône-Alpes
- Coordinates: 45°43′33″N 5°15′08″E
- Country: France
- Region: Auvergne-Rhône-Alpes
- Department: Isère
- Arrondissement: La Tour-du-Pin
- Canton: Charvieu-Chavagneux

Government
  - Mayor (2024–2026): Isabelle Flores
- Area^{1}: 6.14 km^{2} (2.37 sq mi)
- Elevation: 288 m (945 ft)
- Highest elevation: 415 m (1,362 ft)
- Lowest elevation: 203 m (666 ft)
- Population (2023): 3,536
  - Density: 576/km^{2} (1,490/sq mi)
- Demonym: Crémolans
- Time zone: UTC+01:00 (CET)
  - Summer (DST): UTC+02:00 (CEST)
- INSEE/Postal code: 38138 /38460
- ^{1} French Land Register data, which excludes lakes, ponds, glaciers > 1 km^{2} (0.386 sq mi or 247 acres) and river estuaries.

Crémieu (French pronunciation: [kʁemjø]; Arpitan: Crèmiœ) is a commune in the Isère department in southeastern France. This medieval village of 3,536 inhabitants (2023) hosts a celebration called "Les Médiévales" every year in September, which reconstitutes the lifestyle of the Middle Ages. The seal of the région includes a dolphin. The inhabitants of this village are also called "les dauphinois" from the noun "dauphin" in French. The local dish is "le gratin dauphinois" which is a rich potato gratin.

It is located near Bourgoin-Jallieu, about 25 miles east of Lyon.

== Geography ==
=== Location ===
Crémieu is located north-west of the county, 15 km north of Bourgoin, 12 km east of Lyon-Saint-Exupéry Airport and about 25 miles (40 km) east of Lyon.

The surrounding communities are Leyrieu to the north, Annoisin-Chatelans, Siccieu-Saint-Julien-et-Carisieu, Dizimieu, Villemoirieu and Saint-Romain-de-Jalionas.

According to the classification established by INSEE in 1999 Crémieu is an urban town, the city center of an urban unit of two municipalities (the other being Villemoirieu), part of the Lyon urban area.

=== Physical geography ===
The city lies between a hilly area to the east and the flat land of the valley of the Rhone flowing 3 miles (5 km) north.

== Early history ==
Crémieu has a long and important medieval history. First historical references to Crémieu date back to the 12th century, when a Benedictine priory was built high on the cliffs of Saint-Hippolyte. The town itself, however, grew up during the 13th century, on the southern slopes of Saint-Laurent hill and overlooking the walls of the royal castle which the Dauphins of La Tour began to restore in 1282. In 1315, the town was granted important civic and trading rights which marked the beginning of two centuries of prosperity. Building of a new covered market started in 1434, as did the construction of a fortified wall, almost 2 kilometers long, with 9 gates and 14 towers. The wall encircled not only the royal castle, the old town and the cliff of Saint-Hippolyte, but also the site of a new town below, next to an Augustinian monastery. In 1357, a mint was set up at Crémieu, making it even more prosperous. In 2006 a petit blanc coin, struck in the Cremieu mint in 1446 (validated by Cremieu museum) was discovered in the keel of the Newport Medieval Ship. This allowed the construction of the vessel to be dated to not earlier than 1446. It is assumed the petit blanc was placed in the Ship as a token of good luck. The minter of the coin was Jaques Vincent. From the reign of Louis XII (1498–1515), Crémieu benefited from its strategic position on the route of French expeditionary forces bound for Italy. The town became a major trading centre in cereals for France, Savoy, Switzerland and Italy. As early as the 15th century, it had an important Jewish community. Raoul de Gaucourt, governor of Dauphiné, renewed the privileges of the Jews in 1441 for seven years in consideration of the sum of 50 florins, which Moses Dandéli of Crémieu and Aguinet Solomon of Saint-Symphorien, Jewish residents, were to collect from their coreligionists. The Jews of Crémieu refused to pay the sum and emigrated in large numbers. The dauphin Louis XI of France recalled them in 1449, and promised them that if they would reopen their banking-houses, he would tax them only one ounce of fine silver in the future, instead of the half-mark that they had formerly been required to pay. New gates were built in 1535 and the lower town, design along the lines of most medieval "new towns", was completed at the beginning of the 16th century. The 17th century brought monasteries and convents to Crémieu, where trade was by now beginning to flag. The Capuchins settled there in 1615, the white Penitents in 1619, the nuns of the order of Visitations in 1627, the Ursuline nuns in 1633, the Notre-Dame du Reclus hospital opened in 1675 and the church of Saint-John was completed by the end of the 17th century. The town's economic decline, finalised by the suppression, in 1702, of the annual trade fairs dating back to the 14th century, led the townspeople to turn to the leather and textile industries during the 18th century. In 1710, a quarter of the population was working as tanners, cobblers, carders (of both hemp and wool) and spinners. In the next century, the plateau of Isle-Cremieu and the sleepy town below the ruins of the castle and ramparts began to attract landscape artists, led by Corot, as well as travellers, tourists and lovers of all things beautiful.

== Population ==
The residents of the city are known as Crémolan in French.

Historical population

Year	Pop.	±% p.a.
1793	2,236	—
1800	2,123	−0.74%
1806	2,184	+0.47%
1821	2,318	+0.40%
1831	2,401	+0.35%
1836	2,310	−0.77%
1841	2,292	−0.16%
1846	2,284	−0.07%
1851	2,302	+0.16%
1856	2,356	+0.46%
1861	2,370	+0.12%
1866	2,244	−1.09%
1872	2,055	−1.46%
1876	1,978	−0.95%
1881	1,797	−1.90%
1886	1,838	+0.45%
1891	1,694	−1.62%
1896	1,912	+2.45%
1901	1,893	−0.20%

Year	Pop.	±% p.a.
1906	1,743	−1.64%
1911	1,696	−0.55%
1921	1,929	+1.30%
1926	1,971	+0.43%
1931	1,854	−1.22%
1936	1,682	−1.93%
1946	1,536	−0.90%
1954	2,148	+4.28%
1962	2,416	+1.48%
1968	2,393	−0.16%
1975	2,450	+0.34%
1982	2,409	−0.24%
1990	2,855	+2.15%
1999	3,169	+1.17%
2007	3,320	+0.58%
2012	3,334	+0.08%
2017	3,282	−0.31%
2023	3,536	+1.25%

Source: EHESS and INSEE (1968–2023)

== Twin towns ==
Crémieu is twinned with:

- Hüttenberg, Germany, since 1993

== See also ==
- Communes of the Isère department
