= Annoisin-Chatelans =

- Commune
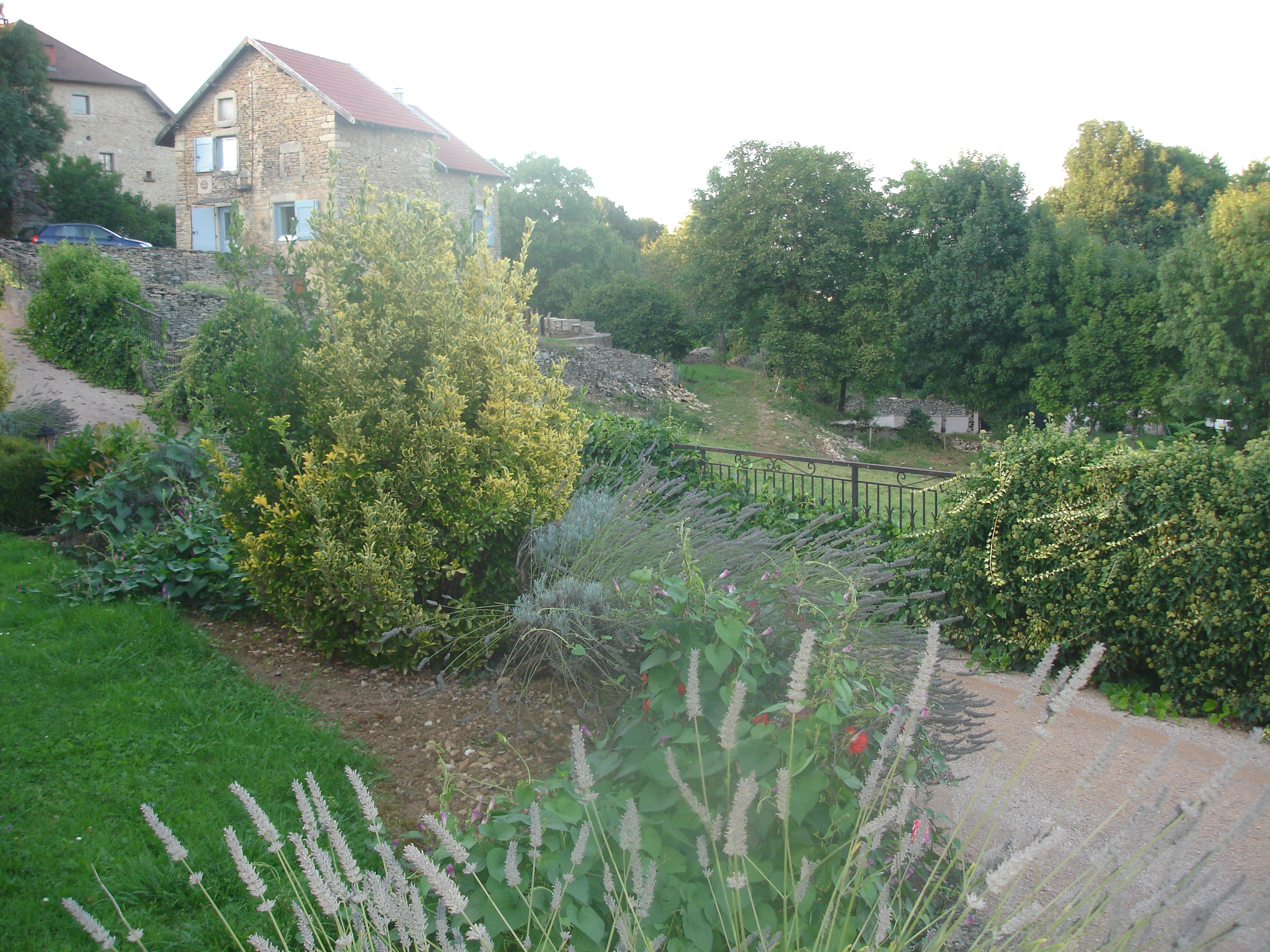
- The heights of Chatelans
- Location of Annoisin-Chatelans
- Location within France Location within Auvergne-Rhône-Alpes
- Coordinates: 45°45′28″N 5°17′39″E
- Country: France
- Region: Auvergne-Rhône-Alpes
- Department: Isère
- Arrondissement: La Tour-du-Pin
- Canton: Charvieu-Chavagneux

Government
  - Mayor (2020–2026): Nora Chebbi
- Area^{1}: 13.27 km^{2} (5.12 sq mi)
- Highest elevation: 452 m (1,483 ft)
- Lowest elevation: 280 m (920 ft)
- Population (2023): 719
  - Density: 54.2/km^{2} (140/sq mi)
- Time zone: UTC+01:00 (CET)
  - Summer (DST): UTC+02:00 (CEST)
- INSEE/Postal code: 38010 /38460
- ^{1} French Land Register data, which excludes lakes, ponds, glaciers > 1 km^{2} (0.386 sq mi or 247 acres) and river estuaries.

Annoisin-Chatelans (French pronunciation: [anwazɛ̃ ʃatlɑ̃]) is a commune in the Isère department in the Auvergne-Rhône-Alpes region of southeastern France.

== Geography ==
The Village of Annoisin-chatelans is located on the foothills and the plateau of the Isle-Crémieu, some 40 km east of Lyon and just 2 km north-east of the town of Crémieu.

It is part of the Community of communes of l'Isle-Crémieu which includes all the communes around Crémieu, the plain side of Lyon with Chamagnieu and Villemoirieu next to the Optevoz hills area.

The commune is characterized by scattered settlements which comes from the merger of two towns of comparable size, Annoisin which faces Crémieu and Chatelans another two kilometres north which faces on to the valley of Amby (Hières-sur-Amby and Optevoz). There are also two other hamlets south of the village called Michalieu and Le Mollard.

Access to the commune is by the D521 minor road from Crémieu in the south passing through the heart of the commune and the village and continuing north then east to join the D52A to Optevoz. The commune is quite heavily forested in the north and along the eastern and western borders however the southern part of the commune is farmland.

== History ==
The plateau of Larina has been occupied since the beginning of the first millennium. There are still traces on the Larina site north of the commune (an oppidum then a Merovingian camp). The first known text on Annoisin was regarding the Parish and its Church in the 1172–1275 period of the Capetian Kings. Formerly attached to Optevoz, Chatelans was attached to the commune of Annoisin in 1842.

== Administration ==
List of Successive Mayors

From	To	Name	Party
1969	1993	Clément Gauthier	ind.
2001	2014	Yves Gentil	
2014	2026	Nora Chebbi	

== Demography ==
The inhabitants of the commune are known as Nuisantins or Nuisantines in French. The population data given in the table and graph below for 1836 and earlier refer to the former commune of Annoisin.

Historical population

Year	Pop.	±% p.a.
1793	253	—
1821	306	+0.68%
1846	620	+2.86%
1872	567	−0.34%
1901	502	−0.42%
1926	390	−1.00%
1946	297	−1.35%
1954	260	−1.65%
1962	231	−1.47%

Year	Pop.	±% p.a.
1968	247	+1.12%
1975	285	+2.07%
1982	301	+0.78%
1990	412	+4.00%
1999	541	+3.07%
2007	618	+1.68%
2012	643	+0.80%
2017	676	+1.01%
2023	719	+1.03%

Source: EHESS and INSEE

== Culture and heritage ==
=== Civil heritage ===
The commune has a number of buildings and sites that are registered as historical monuments:

- An Archaeological Site
- The Domain de la Tour House (1789)
- The War Memorial (1921)
- A House at le Mollard (1580)
- A Primary School at Chatelans (19th century)
- A Farmhouse at Chatelans (1760)
- The Town Hall (formerly a Primary School) (1882)

=== Religious heritage ===
The commune has two religious buildings and sites that are registered as historical monuments:

- The Parish Church of Notre-Dame (12th century) The Church contains several items that are registered as historical objects:
  - A Pulpit (1896)
  - A Confessional (19th century)
  - The Furniture in the Church
- The Cemetery (1863) The Cemetery contains several items that are registered as historical objects:
  - A Priest's Tomb (19th century)
  - The Tomb of Benoît Parent (20th century)
  - A Cemetery Cross (19th century)

=== Environmental heritage ===
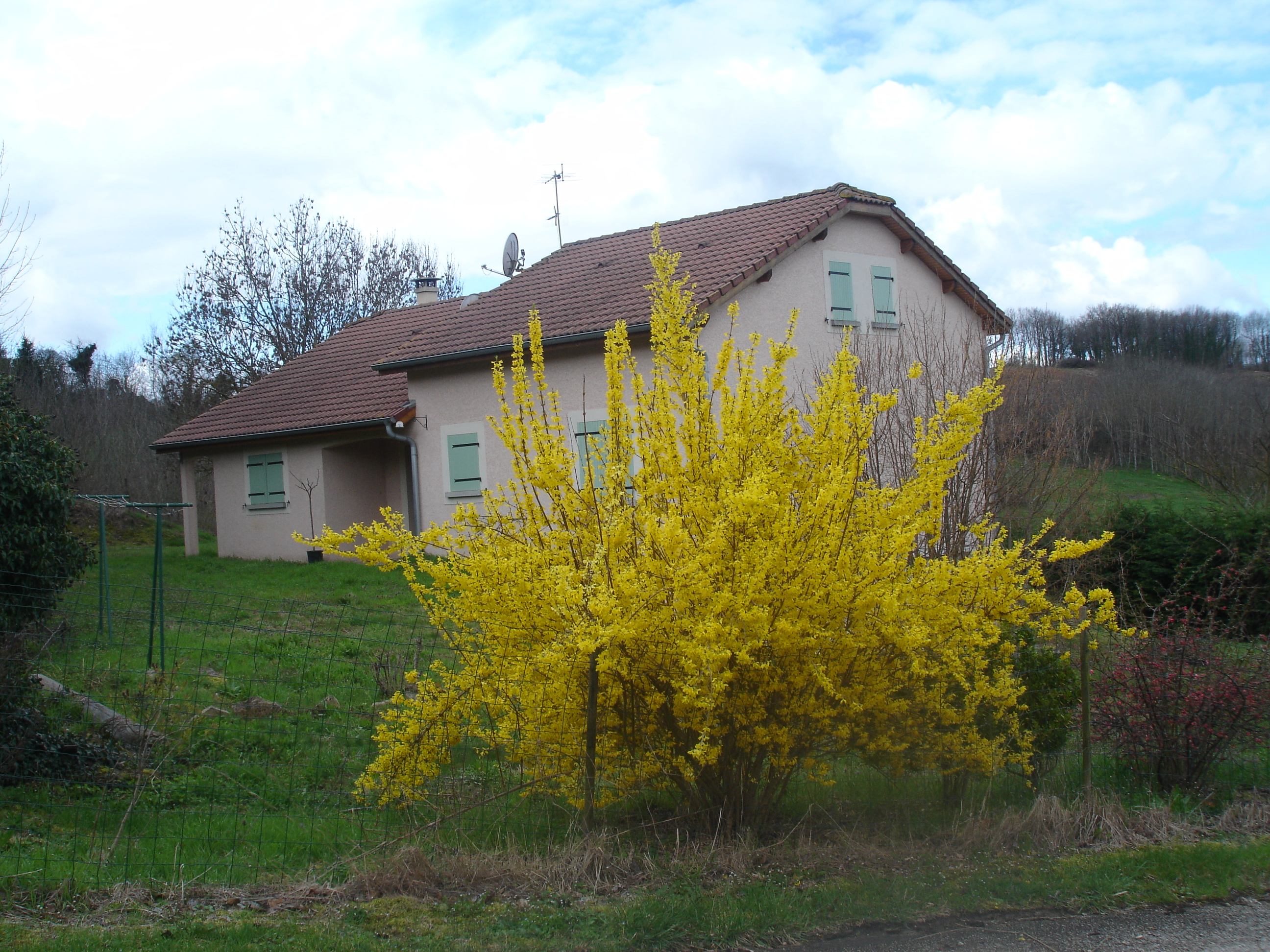
Forsythia in the hamlet of Mollard

This small village in northern Isère has retained many of its houses made of golden stone extracted from quarries that are still used, its surprising octagonal tower, its communal ovens and lavoirs (Public laundries) hidden in the green meadows. The curiosity of the commune, it is precisely the number of bread ovens and lavoirs whether at Annoisin with one oven; or Chatelans with two ovens, a lavoir, and a fountain in the lower part of the village; or the hamlet of Michalieu with a beautiful collection of a bread oven with a lavoir and its cross.

There are many marked trails that wind through the woods and the blue juniper bushes found in abundance on the limestone plateau. They thrive on the edge of beautiful cliffs overlooking the Rhone valley or on the hills where the top of the Alps and Mont Blanc can be seen.

=== Picture Gallery ===
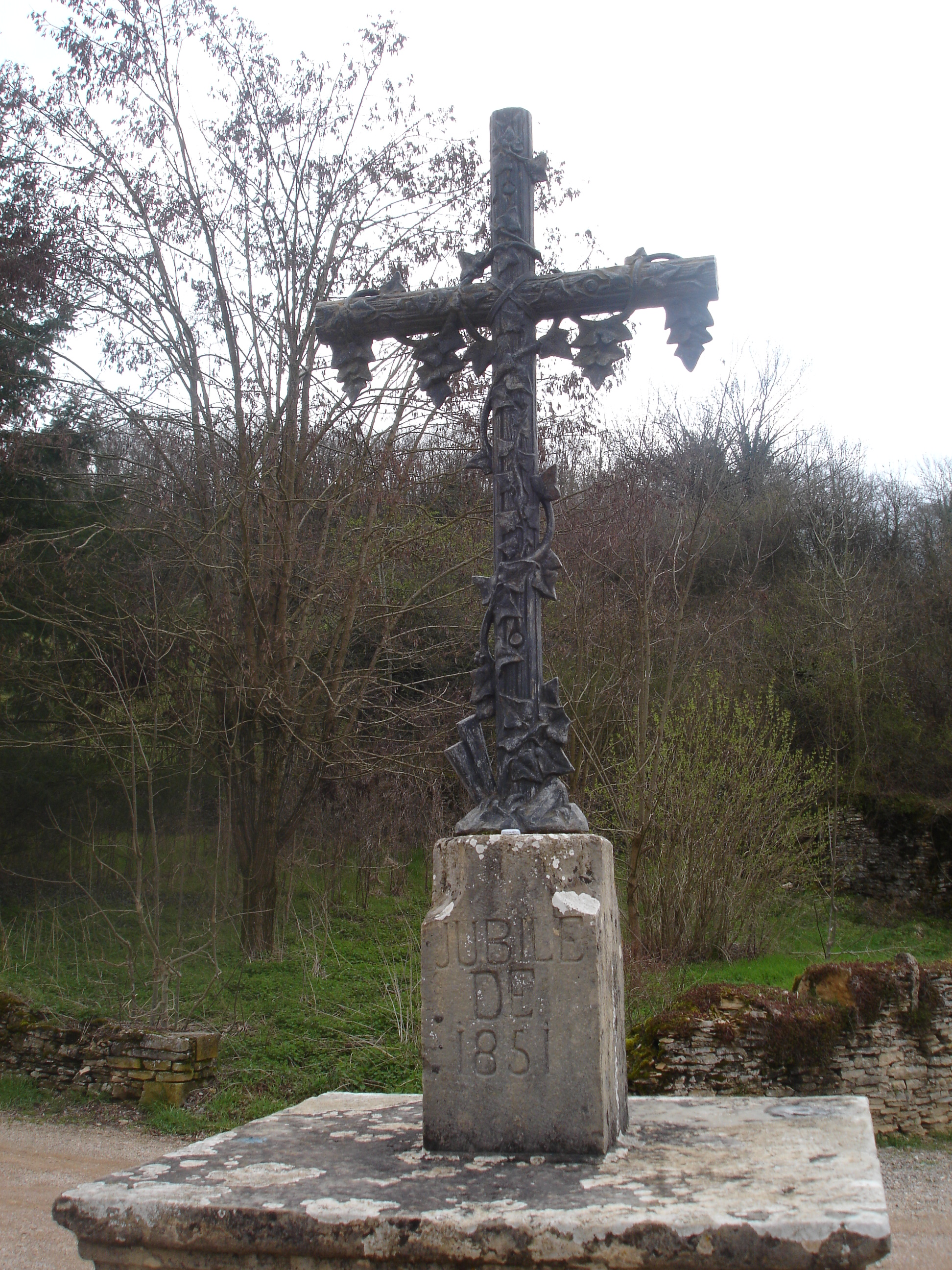
The 1851 Jubilee Cross

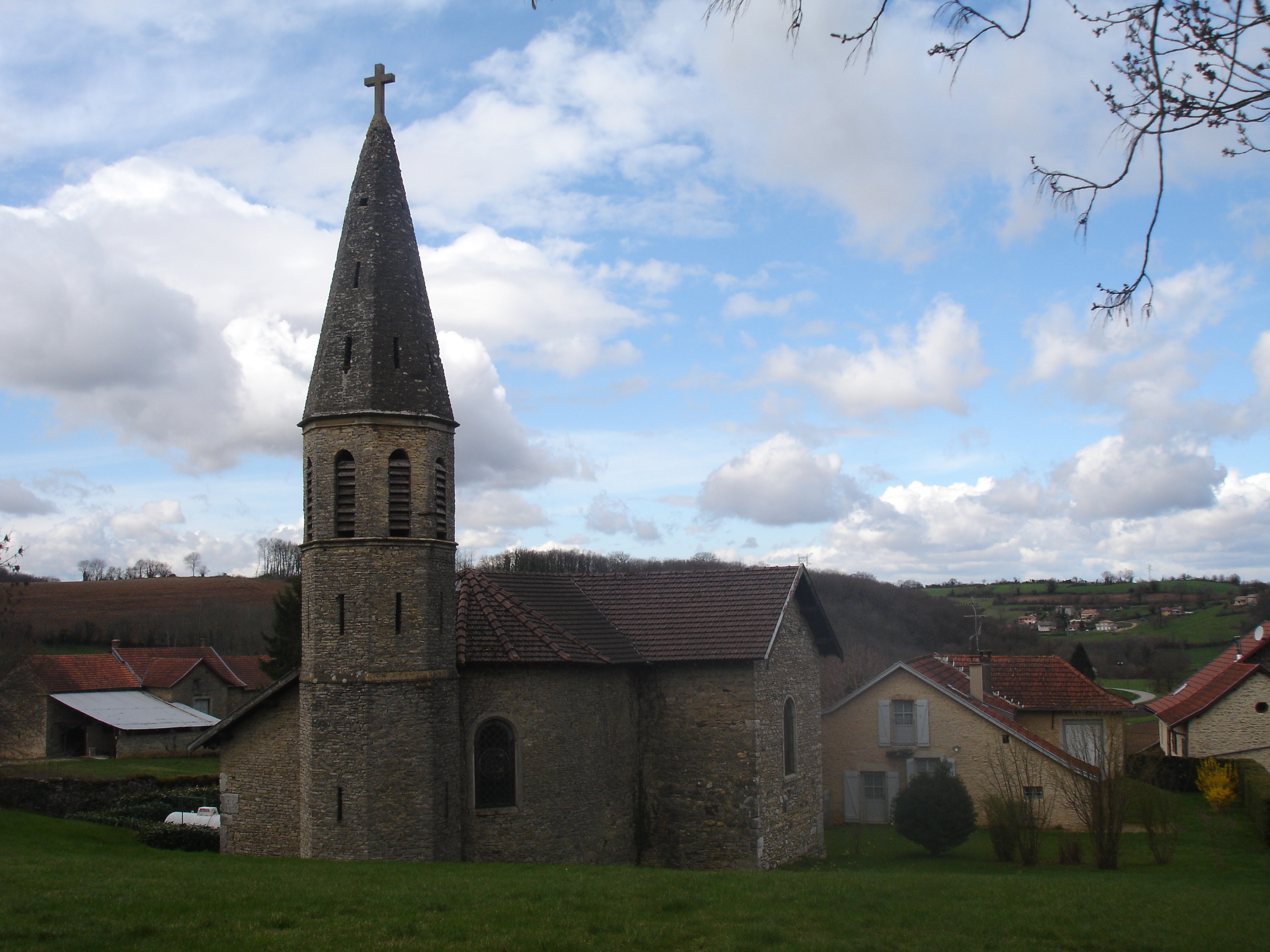
Annoisin Church

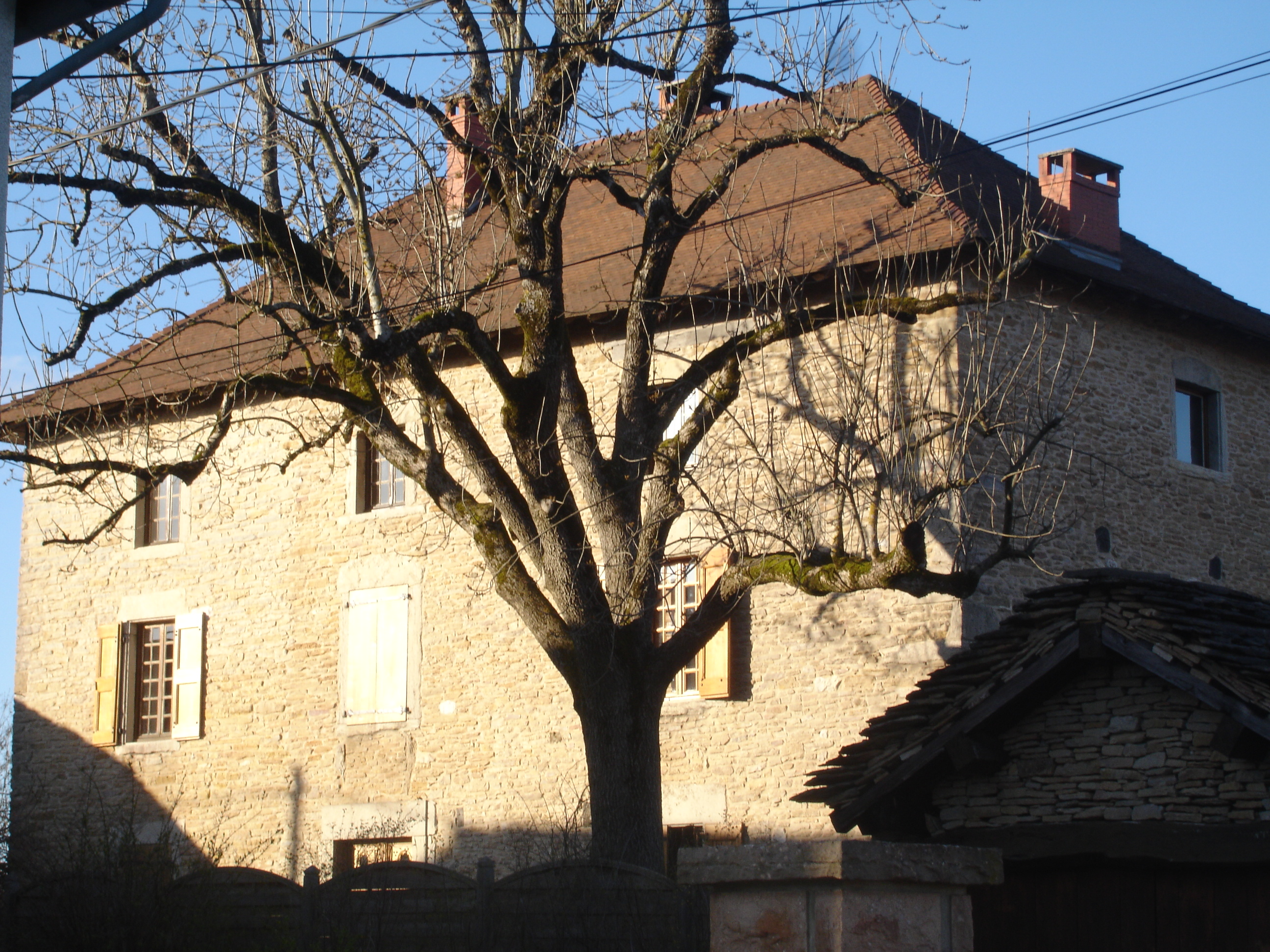
The old manor house

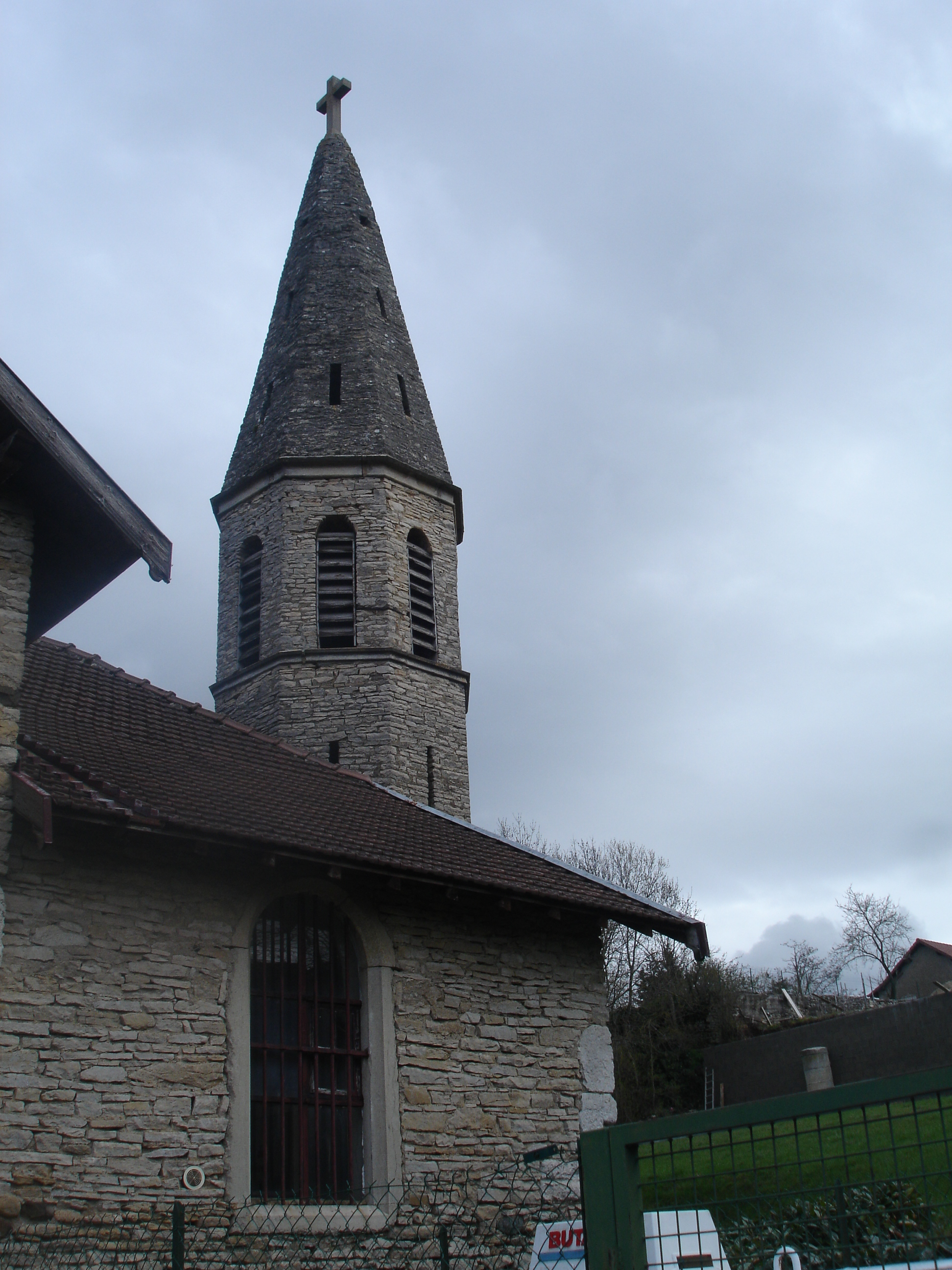
The Church Tower

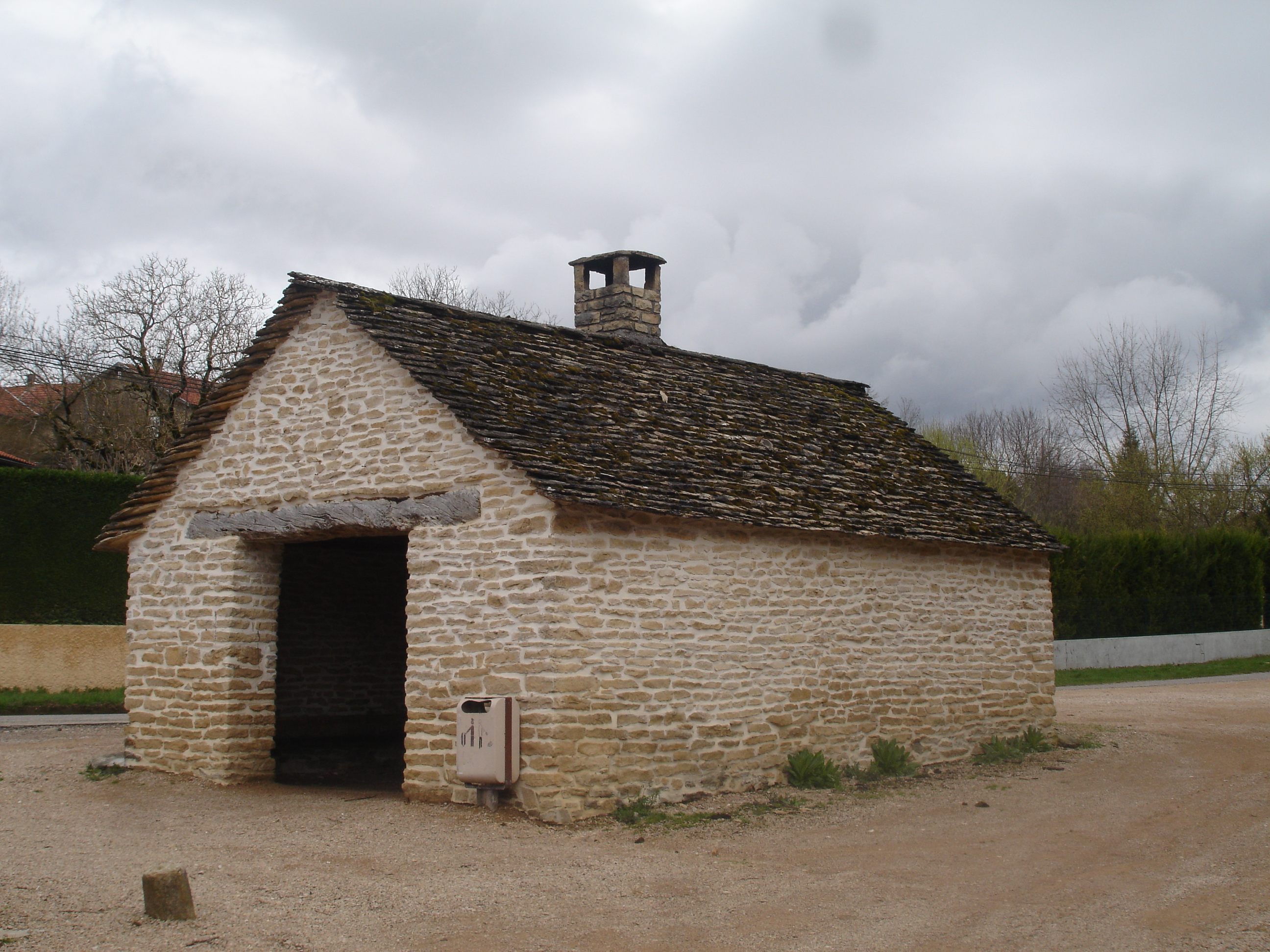
The bread oven at Michalieu

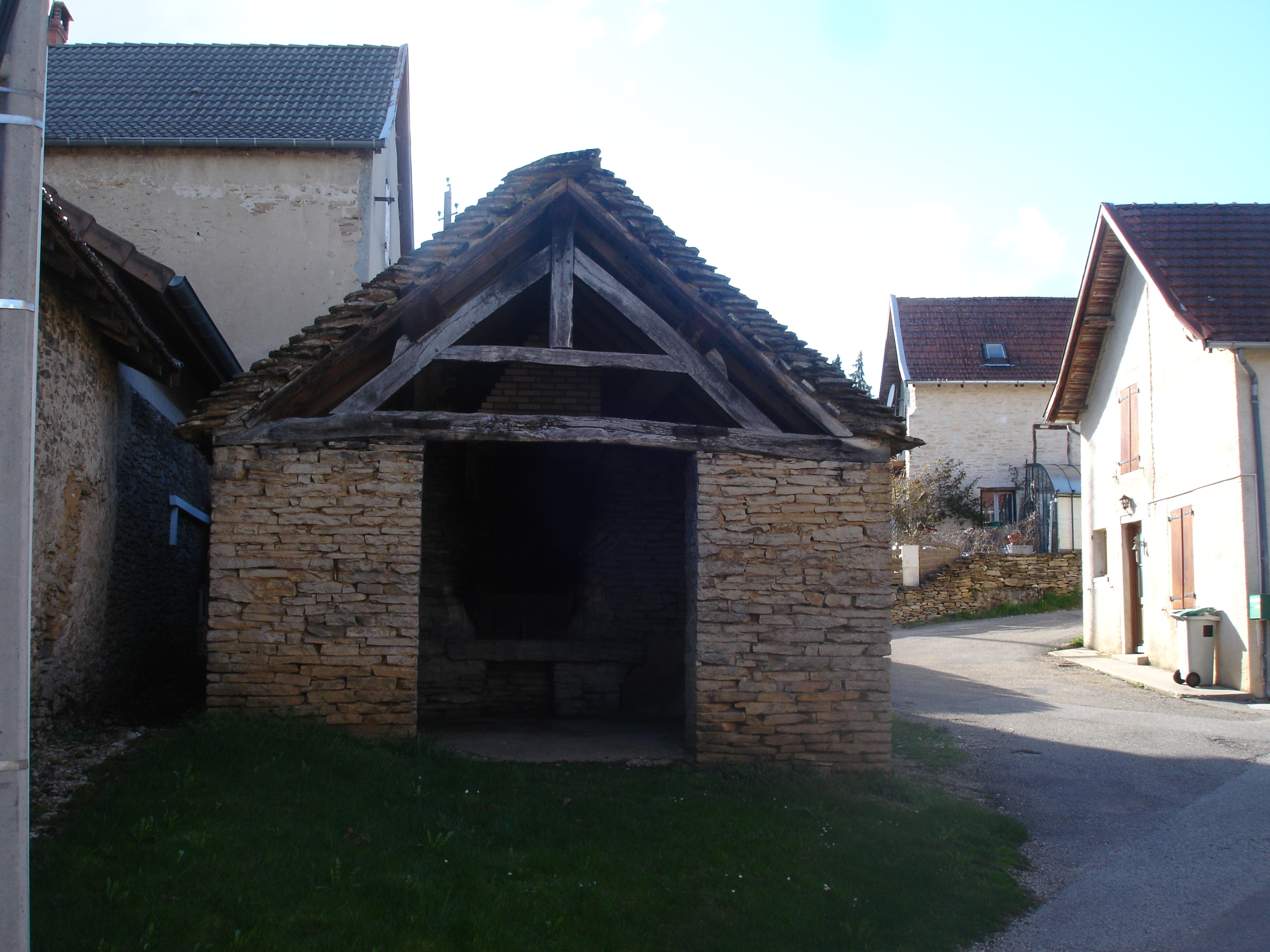
The bread oven at Chatelans

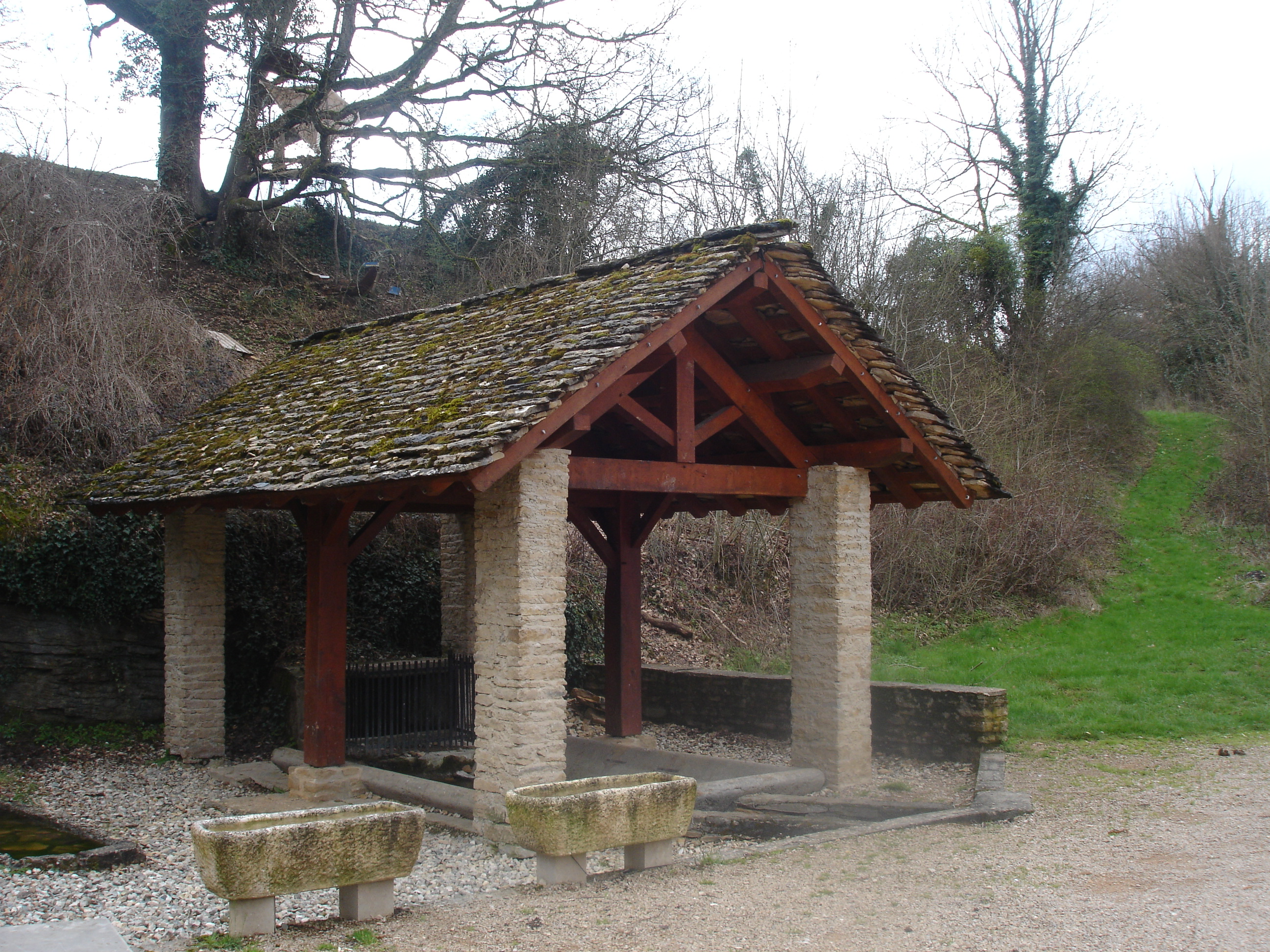
The lavoir at Michalieu

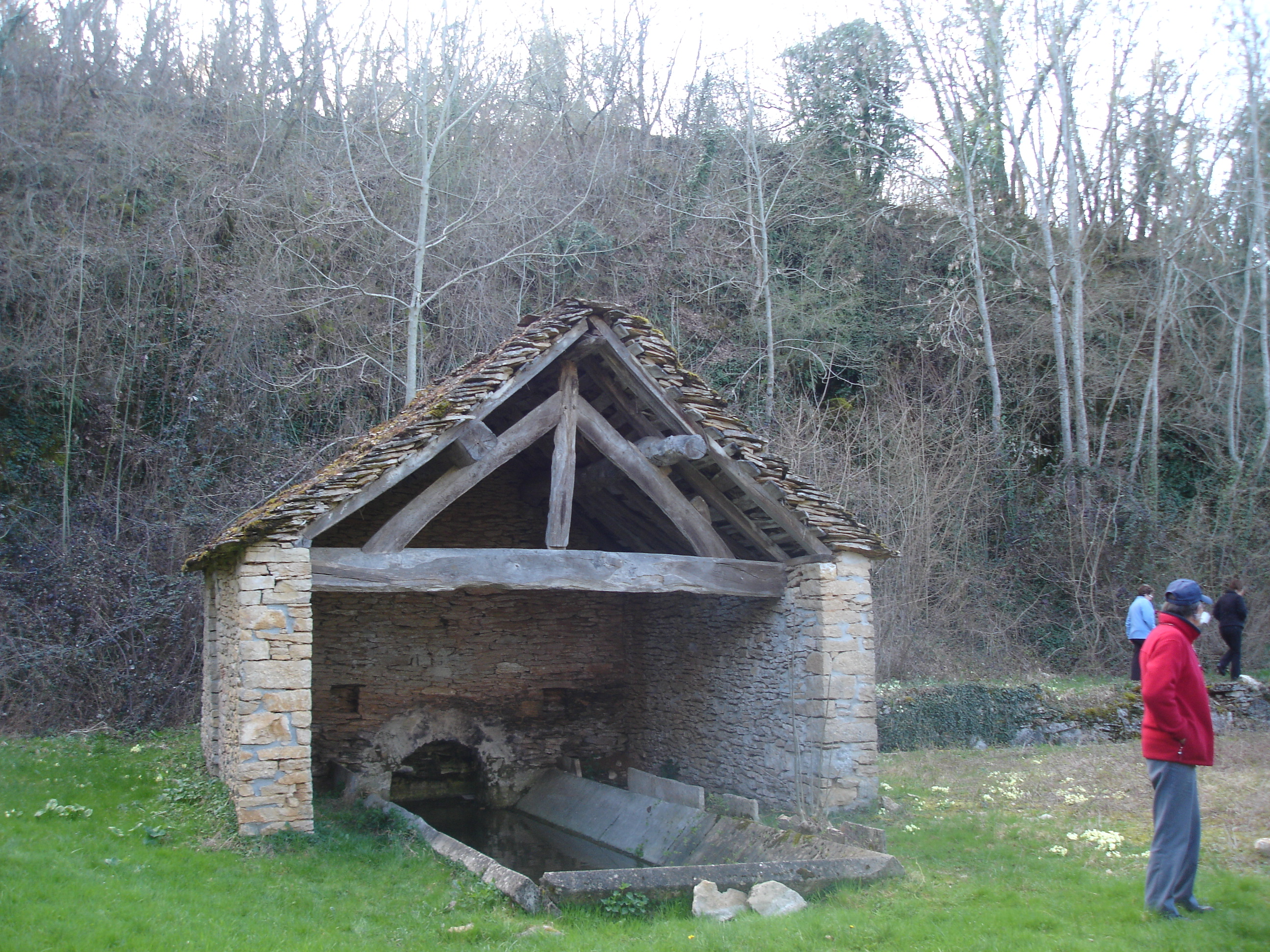
The fountain-lavoir at Chatelans

== See also ==
- Communes of the Isère department
