= Charvieu-Chavagneux =

Commune in Isère, France

- Commune
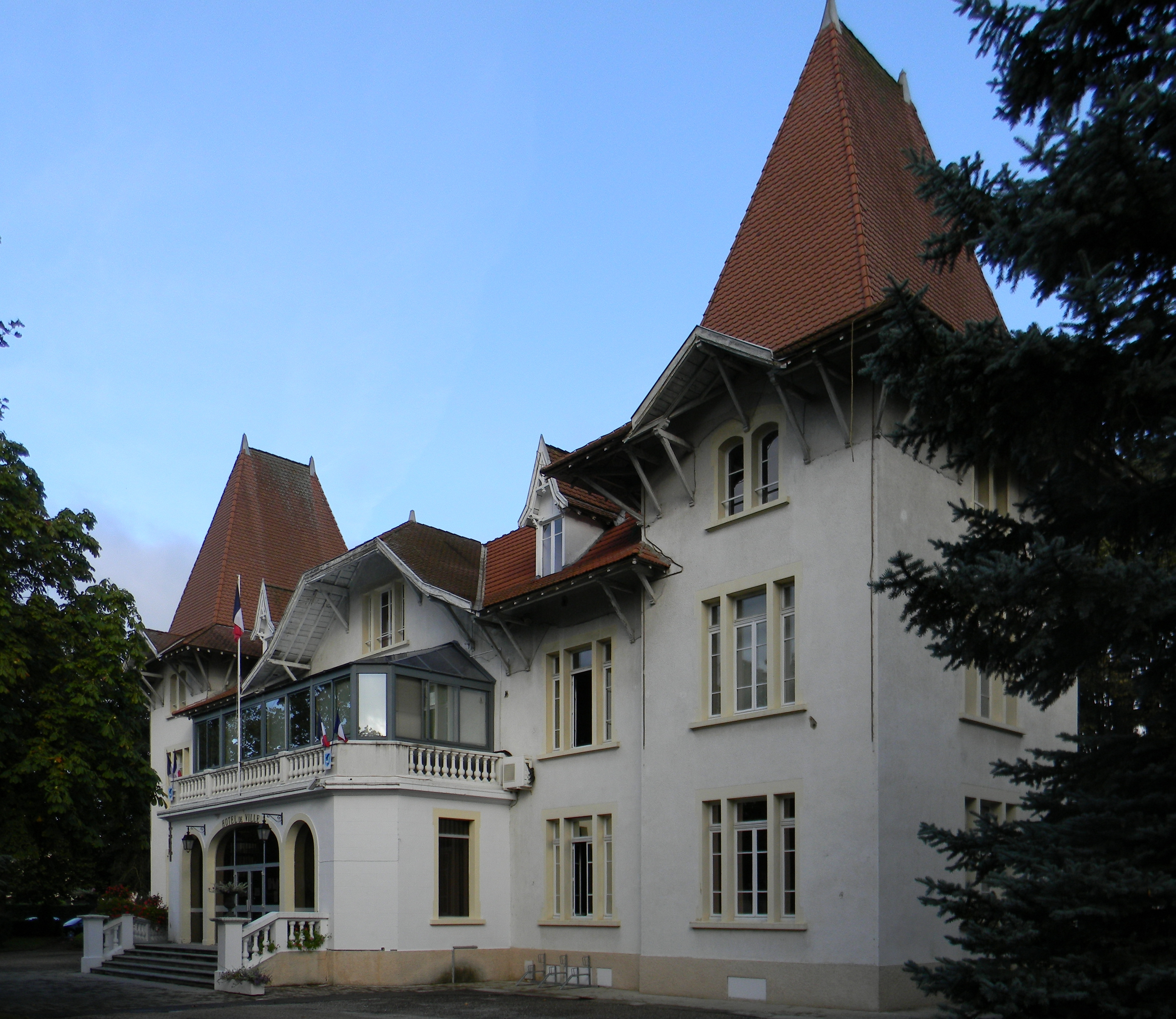
- Town hall

- Coat of arms
- Location of Charvieu-Chavagneux
- Location within France Location within Auvergne-Rhône-Alpes
- Coordinates: 45°44′47″N 5°09′53″E
- Country: France
- Region: Auvergne-Rhône-Alpes
- Department: Isère
- Arrondissement: La Tour-du-Pin
- Canton: Charvieu-Chavagneux
- Intercommunality: Lyon-Saint-Exupéry en Dauphiné

Government
  - Mayor (2020–2026): Gérard Dezempte
- Area^{1}: 8.65 km^{2} (3.34 sq mi)
- Elevation: 220 m (720 ft)
- Highest elevation: 251 m (823 ft)
- Lowest elevation: 200 m (660 ft)
- Population (2023): 10,547
  - Density: 1,220/km^{2} (3,160/sq mi)
- Time zone: UTC+01:00 (CET)
  - Summer (DST): UTC+02:00 (CEST)
- INSEE/Postal code: 38085 /38230
- ^{1} French Land Register data, which excludes lakes, ponds, glaciers > 1 km^{2} (0.386 sq mi or 247 acres) and river estuaries.

Charvieu-Chavagneux (French pronunciation: [ʃaʁvjø ʃavaɲø]) is a commune in the Isère department in southeastern France.

The Bourbre forms most of the commune's eastern border.

== History ==
Charvieu and Chavagneux were separate communities until the merge on 1 May 1961. Charvieu was originally known as Chalveu in the 13th century, derived from calvus, meaning "the bald". Chavagneux was originally known as Chavaigneu in the 11th century, derived from capannacum, a Gallo-Roman name derived from capanna, meaning "hut".

The first human presence in Charvieu and Chavagneux were the Celts, who regularly passed through as shown by ancient roads. During the Middle Ages, pilgrims from the Provence and the Dauphiné on their way to see the relics of Saint Claude also travelled through the area, along where the churches of Charvieu and Chavagneux were built. Teamsters from the Provence and Languedoc often made use of the routes to circumvent customs checkpoints to reach Franche-Comté, Lorraine, Alsace, and Germany. Historically, French kings also travelled through Charvieu and Chavagneux to visit the Dauphiné.

Since at least 1225, the area of Charvieu and Chavagneux were part of the mandement (district) of Anthon. In February 1297, Genouilleux parish priest Guy de Saint Trivier bough half of the toll road rights for Chavagneux. In April 1319, Milon de Vaux, Lord of Chavagneux, formally declared his ownership of Chavagneux as a fief through his previous franc-alleu of the area as part of the Dombes. In January 1487, Seigneur d’Anthon Imbert de Batarnay visited the commune as part of a larger tour of his land.

In early 1590, during the French Wars of Religion, a company of François de Bonne, Duke of Lesdiguières defeated a Lyonnais force between Charvieu and Pont de Chéruis. A rudimentary census of the commune was first held in 1646, by order of Dauphine de Roman as part of a parcellaire (cadastral survey), showing two-thirds of the population were peasants. The 1702 census through Crémieu authorities also noted that fog generated by the marshes of the Bourbre was negatively affecting the health of farmers, coupled with the widespread grain farming yielding little harvest.

Shortly before the French Revolution the final Lord of Chavagneux and Charvieu was Dupont de Chavagneux. The communities were subsequently made part of the Vienne district, within the short-lived Canton of Villette-d'Anthon. Amidst dechristianization efforts, Chavagneaux officials, including the mayor Doitier, defended the local Catholic priest, Jean Sorbier, in a letter posted on 10 July 1794, attesting that Sorbier held supportive views on French Republicanism.

Both Chavagneux and Charvieu were sites where the first Canut revolts occurred in November 1831. In May 1833, the Charvieu Municipal Council lodged a formal complaint againsst Victor-Amédée de Savoye, who had ordered the construction of mills in 1831 without proper permits, destroying a communal watering trough in the process. Particularly poor crop yields in 1846 and 1847 required residents to rely on a workhouse, which provided food in exchange for road repairs.

In 1849, Etienne Claude Grammont, an early industrialist from Saint-Étienne, opened two workshops at the site of two former mills at the Bourbre, producing steel wire as well as rolling steel and brass. By 1881, Grammont employed 143 workers, over a third of the local populace. Grammont's successor, his son Alexandre, built another factory in Saint-Tropez, with a focus on electric generators and power lines. The earnings were used to fund the expansion of worker accommodations in Charvieu, including a science school, a daycare, a maternity clinic, and a social hygiene center, leading to the creation of the A. Grammont Foundation. The business is credited with the commune's population growth from 308 in 1834 to nearly 2,000 in 1920.

In 1930, the Grammont factories were sold to Pirelli, a subsidy of which was then acquired Phoenix AG, both specialising in rubber tubing and footwear. The latter employed 800 residents as of 1982.

== Population ==
Historical population

| Year | Pop. | ±% p.a. |
|---|---|---|
| 1793 | 168 | — |
| 1800 | 119 | −4.81% |
| 1806 | 208 | +9.75% |
| 1821 | 283 | +2.07% |
| 1831 | 308 | +0.85% |
| 1836 | 382 | +4.40% |
| 1841 | 418 | +1.82% |
| 1846 | 433 | +0.71% |
| 1851 | 470 | +1.65% |
| 1856 | 516 | +1.89% |
| 1861 | 485 | −1.23% |
| 1866 | 515 | +1.21% |
| 1872 | 811 | +7.86% |
| 1876 | 340 | −19.53% |
| 1881 | 348 | +0.47% |
| 1886 | 380 | +1.77% |
| 1891 | 441 | +3.02% |
| 1896 | 493 | +2.25% |
| 1901 | 743 | +8.55% |

| Year | Pop. | ±% p.a. |
|---|---|---|
| 1906 | 1,041 | +6.98% |
| 1911 | 1,160 | +2.19% |
| 1921 | 1,945 | +5.30% |
| 1926 | 2,390 | +4.21% |
| 1931 | 2,090 | −2.65% |
| 1936 | 1,965 | −1.23% |
| 1946 | 2,056 | +0.45% |
| 1954 | 2,355 | +1.71% |
| 1962 | 3,045 | +3.26% |
| 1968 | 3,691 | +3.26% |
| 1975 | 6,470 | +8.35% |
| 1982 | 6,804 | +0.72% |
| 1990 | 8,126 | +2.24% |
| 1999 | 7,889 | −0.33% |
| 2007 | 7,733 | −0.25% |
| 2012 | 8,247 | +1.30% |
| 2017 | 9,661 | +3.22% |
| 2023 | 10,547 | +1.47% |

Source: EHESS and INSEE (1968-2023)

== Personalities ==
- Jean Djorkaeff, professional football player
- Edward Stachura, Polish poet, philosopher and prose writer

== International relations ==
The commune is twinned with:

- Nauheim, Germany
- Nole, Italy
- Korosten, Ukraine
- Vagharshapat, Armenia

== See also ==
- Communes of the Isère department
