= Vénérieu =

- Commune
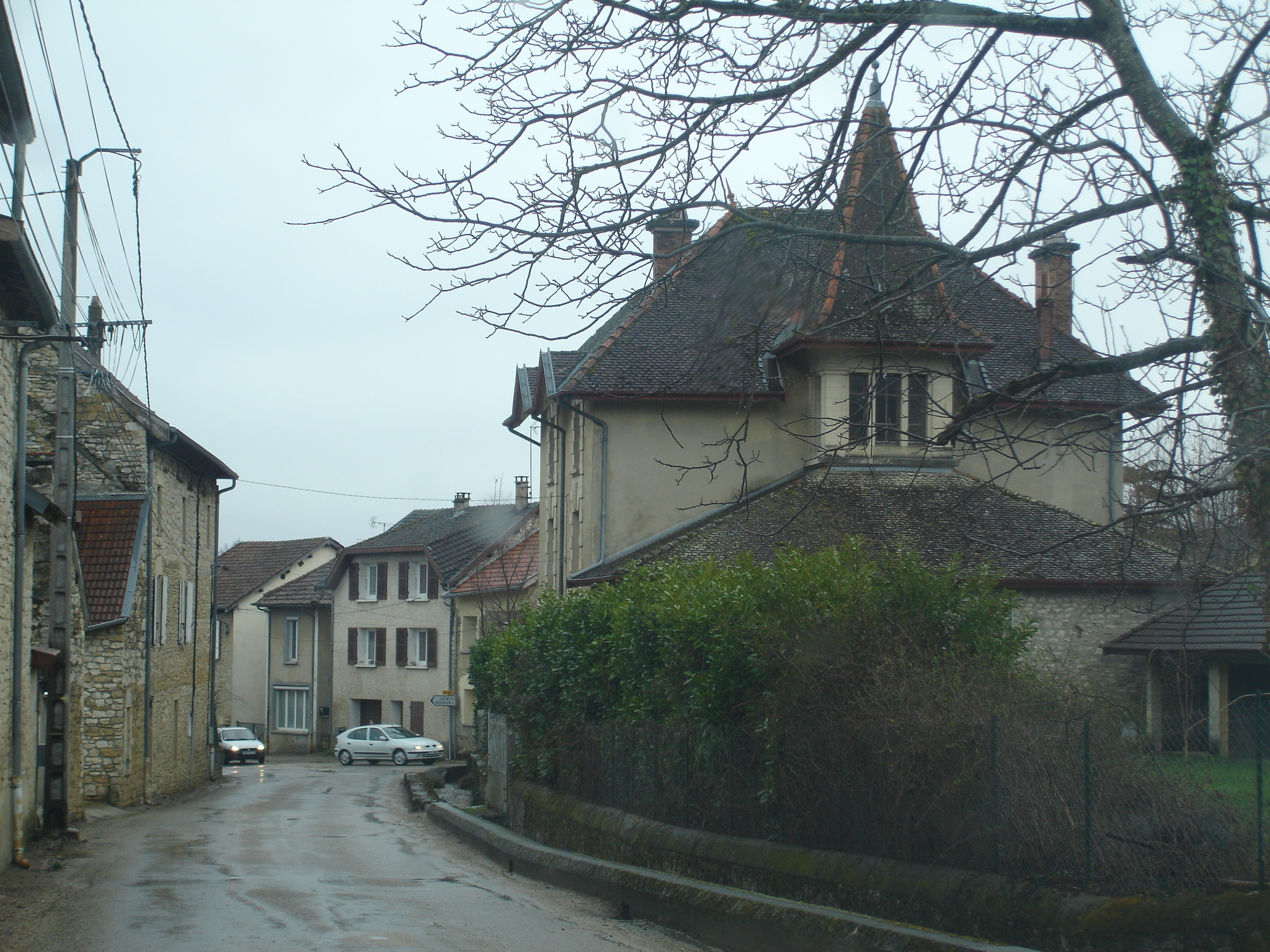
- The centre of the village
- Location of Vénérieu
- Location within France Location within Auvergne-Rhône-Alpes
- Coordinates: 45°39′36″N 5°16′42″E
- Country: France
- Region: Auvergne-Rhône-Alpes
- Department: Isère
- Arrondissement: La Tour-du-Pin
- Canton: Charvieu-Chavagneux

Government
  - Mayor (2020–2026): Christian Franzoi
- Area^{1}: 6 km^{2} (2.3 sq mi)
- Elevation: 250 m (820 ft)
- Highest elevation: 420 m (1,380 ft)
- Lowest elevation: 217 m (712 ft)
- Population (2023): 968
  - Density: 160/km^{2} (420/sq mi)
- Time zone: UTC+01:00 (CET)
  - Summer (DST): UTC+02:00 (CEST)
- INSEE/Postal code: 38532 /38460
- ^{1} French Land Register data, which excludes lakes, ponds, glaciers > 1 km^{2} (0.386 sq mi or 247 acres) and river estuaries.

Vénérieu (French pronunciation: [veneʁjø]) is a commune in the Isère department in southeastern France.

== Population ==
Historical population
Year	Pop.	±% p.a.
1968	221	—
1975	231	+0.63%
1982	270	+2.25%
1990	338	+2.85%
1999	382	+1.37%
2007	533	+4.25%
2012	667	+4.59%
2017	846	+4.87%
2023	968	+2.27%
Source: INSEE

== See also ==
- Communes of the Isère department
