= Anthon, Isère =

Anthon
- Commune
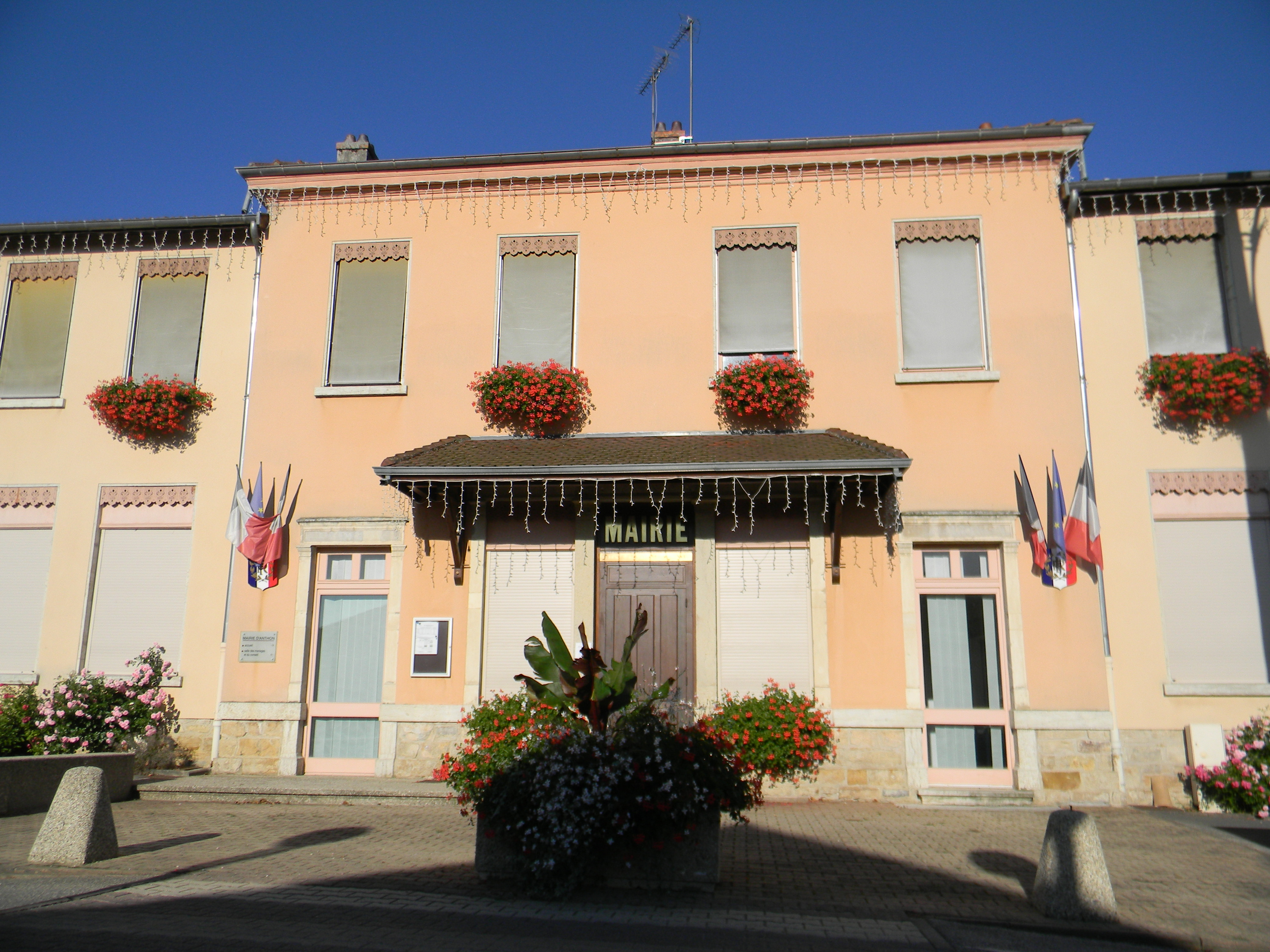
- The town hall of Anthon

- Coat of arms
- Location of Anthon
- Location within France Location within Auvergne-Rhône-Alpes
- Coordinates: 45°47′30″N 5°10′14″E
- Country: France
- Region: Auvergne-Rhône-Alpes
- Department: Isère
- Arrondissement: La Tour-du-Pin
- Canton: Charvieu-Chavagneux

Government
  - Mayor (2026–32): Cédric Camp
- Area^{1}: 8.82 km^{2} (3.41 sq mi)
- Elevation: 200 m (660 ft)
- Highest elevation: 249 m (817 ft)
- Lowest elevation: 182 m (597 ft)
- Population (2023): 1,154
  - Density: 131/km^{2} (339/sq mi)
- Time zone: UTC+01:00 (CET)
  - Summer (DST): UTC+02:00 (CEST)
- INSEE/Postal code: 38011 /38280
- ^{1} French Land Register data, which excludes lakes, ponds, glaciers > 1 km^{2} (0.386 sq mi or 247 acres) and river estuaries.

Anthon (French pronunciation: [ɑ̃tɔ̃]) is a commune in the Isère department in southeastern France.

== Geography ==
Anthon stands on the left bank of the river Rhône opposite its confluence with the Ain, about 30 kilometres upstream from the centre of Lyon. Its inhabitants are Anthonois.

== History ==
The place was originally established as a town by one Antonius Nepos. The only one we have named in Roman history was the fellow consul of Cicero in 62 BCE. He was Caius Antonius Nepos, uncle of the triumvir Marcus Antonius and second son of Marcus Antonius Orator.

Caius Antonius Nepos was condemned for misappropriation of public funds and exiled in 59 BCE. He found refuge in Cephellenia according to some and in Gaul according to others. We might assume therefore that Anthon was the place.

A poem of about 450 CE, by Sidonius Apollinaris celebrates the wines of Anthon.

The Lords of Anthon have been from time immemorial, the tenants of this land. Nowhere in the period of Charlemagne's empire, nor in those around that period is there an indication of their having obtained it. We are therefore left to conclude that they have held the land since Antiquity.

Guichard I brought fame on himself during the First Crusade in 1096. His distant descendant, Louis d'Anthon disappeared in 1326; the manor was awarded to his younger sister, who ceded it to her aunt, spouse of Hugues de Genève.

It passed next to the Saluces. The d'Anthons had as a coat of arms (blazon): "gules, dragon or with human head."

The d'Anthon family survived some time through a cadet branch, the Varaxs which died out in the fifteenth century. The descent of Louis d'Anthon is not known. Several branches of the d'Anthons or Dantons claim descent from him.

There was also the "Battle of Anthon" which took place on 11 June 1430. Louis de Chalon, strengthened by his impressive numerical superiority with his 4 000 men, calmly advanced to the aid of the château de Colombier but he did not know that it had already been captured. He set out on the way from Anton to Colombier which winds through the woods but there were 1,600 soldiers from the Dauphiné (that is to say his enemies) lying in ambush in the thickets near the village of Janneyrias.

The Orangist (supporting the House of Orange), strung out along the narrow path, was sorely surprised throughout. The powerful Orangist cavalry was caught in a trap. Soon, there was general confusion and they were heading for Anthon; every man for himself. The fugitives abandoned arms and baggage and ran away through the wood. More than 200 men drowned themselves in trying to cross the tumultuous Rhône. That is how the 'Battle of Anthon' ended, with the Dauphiné saved.

== Administration ==
List of mayors
Term	Name
2001–2008	Pierre Robert
2008–2020	Bruno Bon
2020–incumbent	Cédric Camp

== Population ==
Historical population
Year	Pop.	±% p.a.
1968	225	—
1975	264	+2.31%
1982	333	+3.37%
1990	697	+9.67%
1999	917	+3.09%
2007	943	+0.35%
2012	1,017	+1.52%
2017	1,061	+0.85%
2023	1,154	+1.41%
Source: INSEE

== Sights ==
- Ancient tower
- 19th century church

== Personalities ==
- Caius Antonius Nepos

== See also ==
- Communes of the Isère département
- Georges Danton
