= Saint-Baudille-de-la-Tour =

- Commune
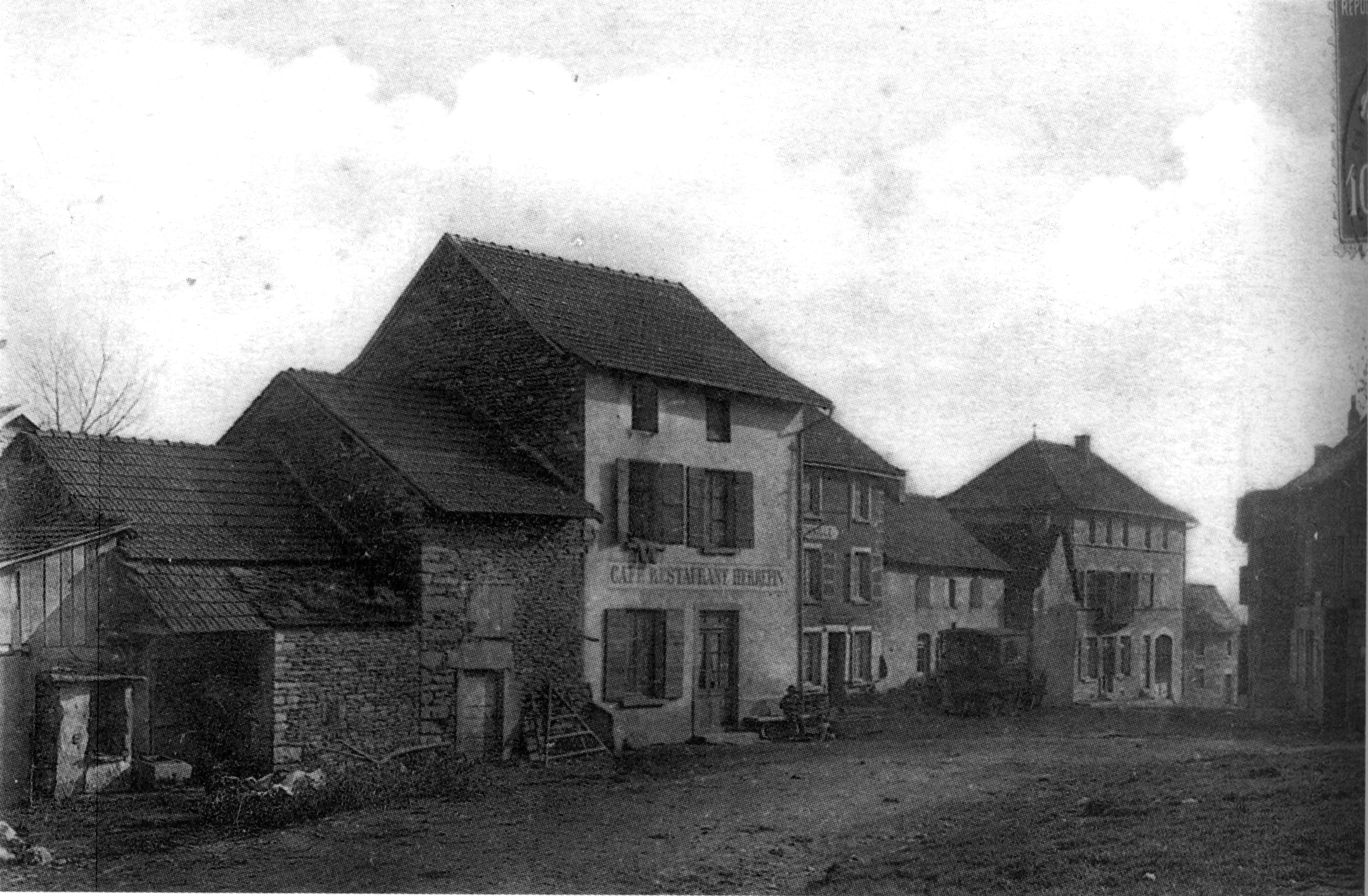
- Saint-Baudille de-la-Tour in 1907
- Location of Saint-Baudille-de-la-Tour
- Location within France Location within Auvergne-Rhône-Alpes
- Coordinates: 45°47′26″N 5°20′21″E
- Country: France
- Region: Auvergne-Rhône-Alpes
- Department: Isère
- Arrondissement: La Tour-du-Pin
- Canton: Charvieu-Chavagneux

Government
  - Mayor (2020–2026): Denis Thollon
- Area^{1}: 21.76 km^{2} (8.40 sq mi)
- Elevation: 354 m (1,161 ft)
- Highest elevation: 404 m (1,325 ft)
- Lowest elevation: 230 m (750 ft)
- Population (2023): 849
  - Density: 39.0/km^{2} (101/sq mi)
- Time zone: UTC+01:00 (CET)
  - Summer (DST): UTC+02:00 (CEST)
- INSEE/Postal code: 38365 /38118
- ^{1} French Land Register data, which excludes lakes, ponds, glaciers > 1 km^{2} (0.386 sq mi or 247 acres) and river estuaries.

Saint-Baudille-de-la-Tour (French pronunciation: [sɛ̃ bodij də la tuʁ], literally Saint-Baudille of La Tour) is a commune in the Isère department in southeastern France.

== Population ==
Historical population
Year	Pop.	±% p.a.
1968	308	—
1975	348	+1.76%
1982	430	+3.07%
1990	475	+1.25%
1999	570	+2.05%
2007	717	+2.91%
2012	787	+1.88%
2017	814	+0.68%
2023	849	+0.70%
Source: INSEE

== See also ==
- Communes of the Isère department
