= Moras =

- Commune
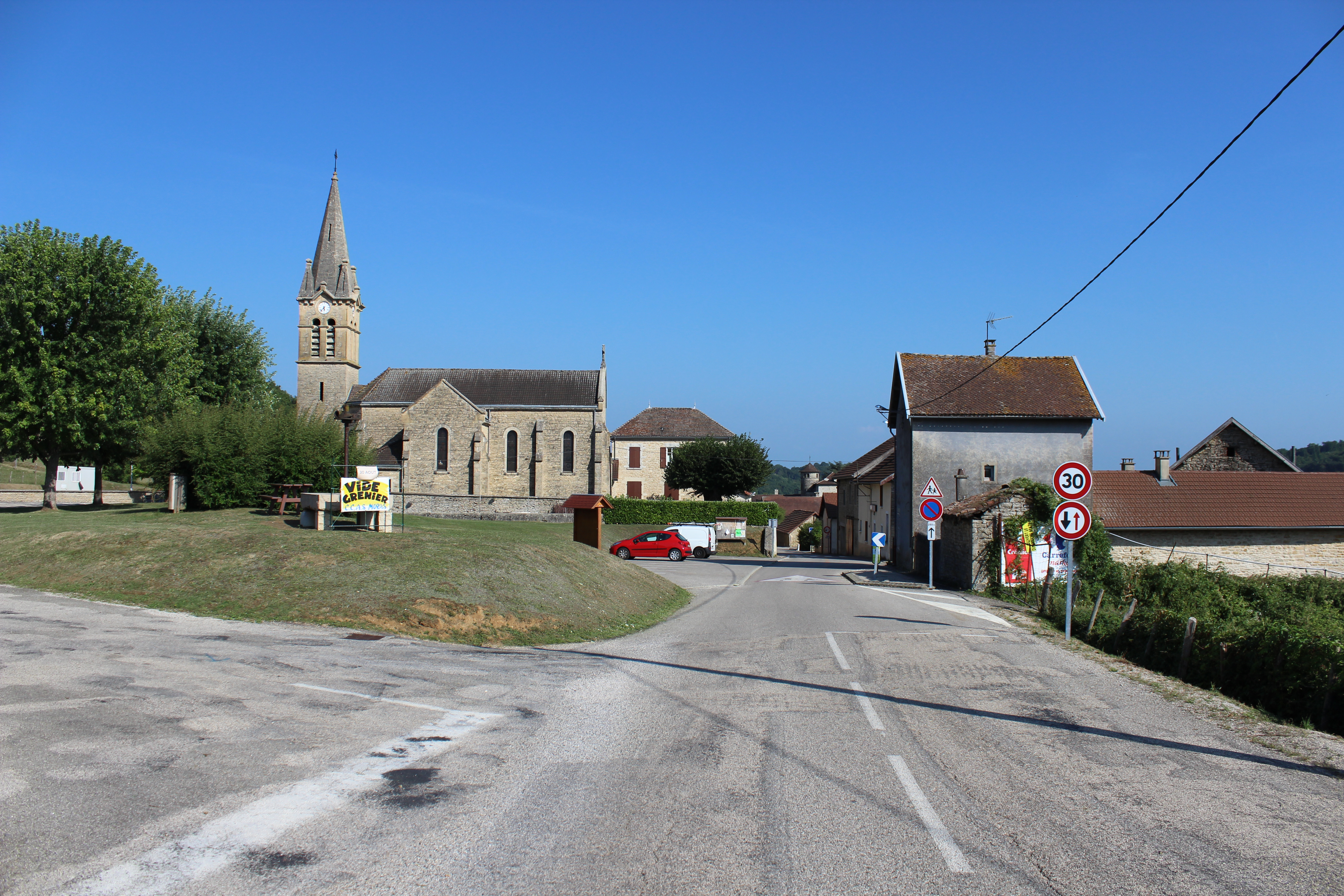
- The church of Moras and its surroundings
- Location of Moras
- Location within France Location within Auvergne-Rhône-Alpes
- Coordinates: 45°41′18″N 5°15′32″E
- Country: France
- Region: Auvergne-Rhône-Alpes
- Department: Isère
- Arrondissement: La Tour-du-Pin
- Canton: Charvieu-Chavagneux

Government
  - Mayor (2022–2026): Sylvie Bogas
- Area^{1}: 8.32 km^{2} (3.21 sq mi)
- Elevation: 345 m (1,132 ft)
- Highest elevation: 436 m (1,430 ft)
- Lowest elevation: 275 m (902 ft)
- Population (2023): 520
  - Density: 62/km^{2} (160/sq mi)
- Time zone: UTC+01:00 (CET)
  - Summer (DST): UTC+02:00 (CEST)
- INSEE/Postal code: 38260 /38460
- ^{1} French Land Register data, which excludes lakes, ponds, glaciers > 1 km^{2} (0.386 sq mi or 247 acres) and river estuaries.

Moras is a commune in the Isère department in southeastern France.

== Population ==
Historical population
Year	Pop.	±% p.a.
1968	167	—
1975	188	+1.71%
1982	359	+9.68%
1990	339	−0.71%
1999	418	+2.35%
2007	463	+1.29%
2012	488	+1.06%
2017	511	+0.93%
2023	520	+0.29%
Source: INSEE

== See also ==
- Communes of the Isère department
