= Vernas =

- Commune
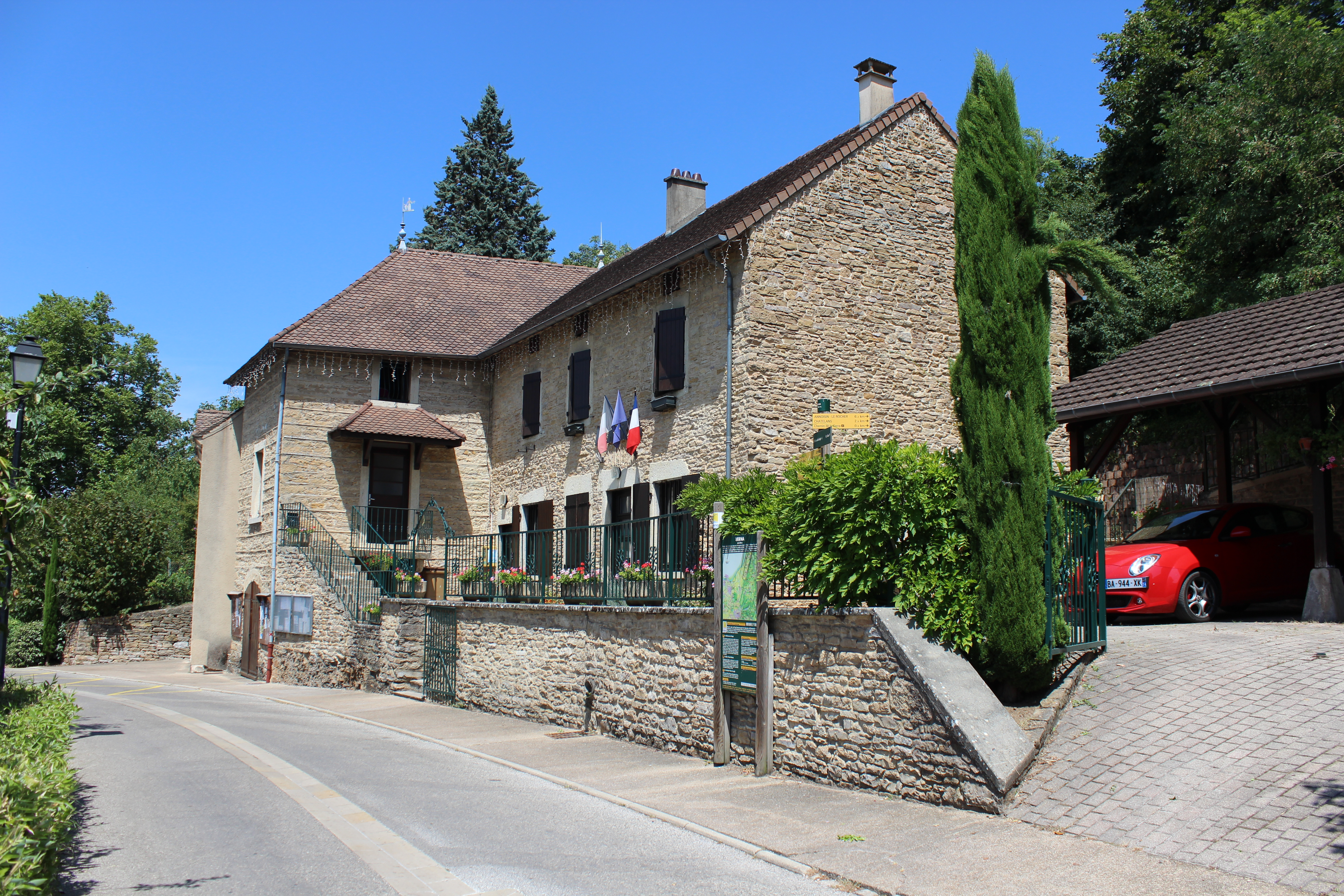
- The town hall of Vernas
- Location of Vernas
- Location within France Location within Auvergne-Rhône-Alpes
- Coordinates: 45°46′42″N 5°16′57″E
- Country: France
- Region: Auvergne-Rhône-Alpes
- Department: Isère
- Arrondissement: La Tour-du-Pin
- Canton: Charvieu-Chavagneux

Government
  - Mayor (2020–2026): Léon Morgue
- Area^{1}: 5.87 km^{2} (2.27 sq mi)
- Elevation: 210 m (690 ft)
- Highest elevation: 429 m (1,407 ft)
- Lowest elevation: 195 m (640 ft)
- Population (2023): 268
  - Density: 45.7/km^{2} (118/sq mi)
- Time zone: UTC+01:00 (CET)
  - Summer (DST): UTC+02:00 (CEST)
- INSEE/Postal code: 38535 /38460
- ^{1} French Land Register data, which excludes lakes, ponds, glaciers > 1 km^{2} (0.386 sq mi or 247 acres) and river estuaries.

Vernas is a commune in the Isère department in southeastern France.

== Population ==
Historical population
Year	Pop.	±% p.a.
1968	97	—
1975	90	−1.06%
1982	117	+3.82%
1990	155	+3.58%
1999	174	+1.29%
2007	222	+3.09%
2012	250	+2.40%
2017	266	+1.25%
2023	268	+0.12%
Source: INSEE

== See also ==
- Communes of the Isère department
