= Tignieu-Jameyzieu =

- Commune
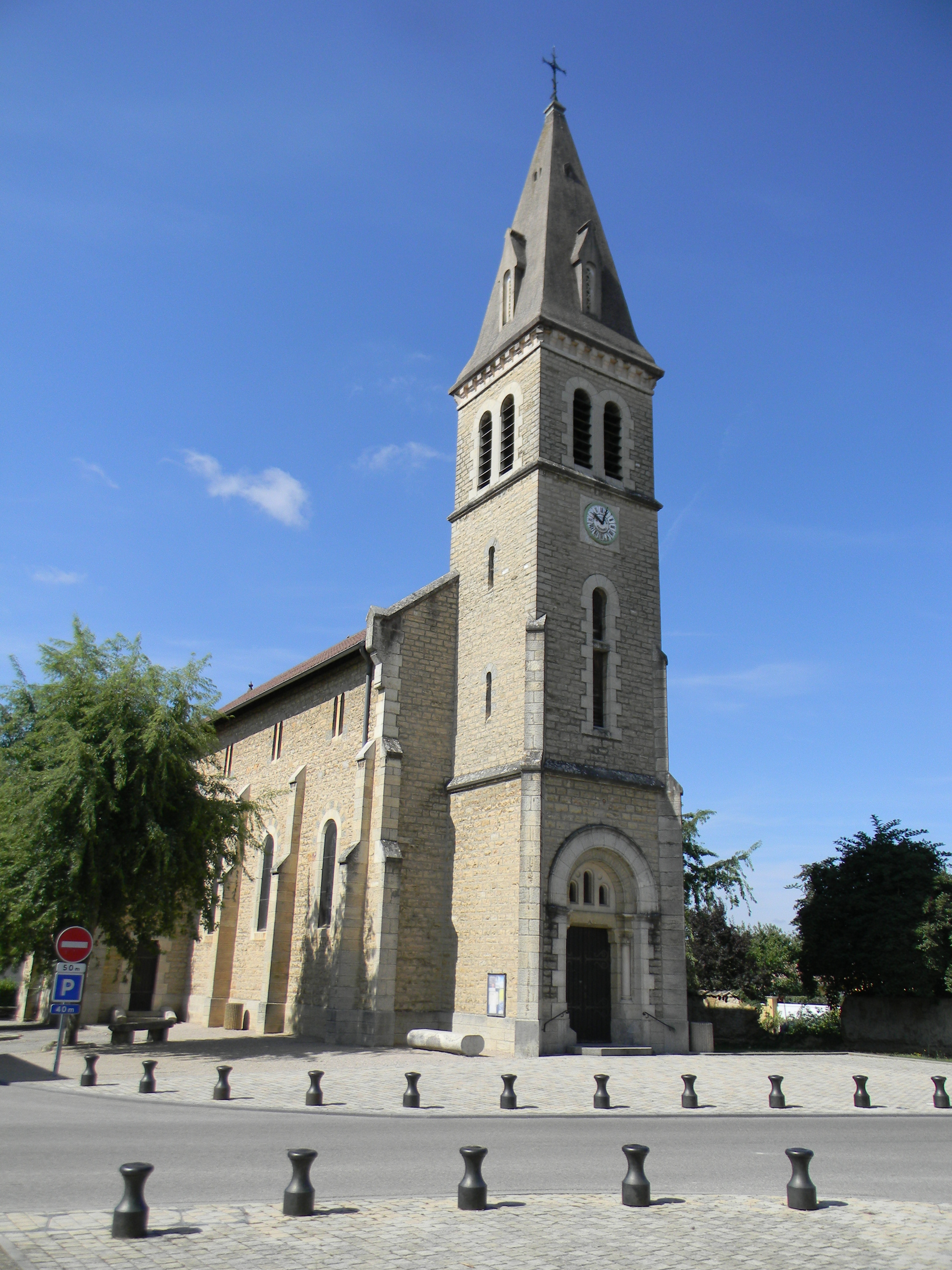
- The church of Saint-Antoine, in Tignieu-Jameyzieu
- Location of Tignieu-Jameyzieu
- Location within France Location within Auvergne-Rhône-Alpes
- Coordinates: 45°44′05″N 5°11′17″E
- Country: France
- Region: Auvergne-Rhône-Alpes
- Department: Isère
- Arrondissement: La Tour-du-Pin
- Canton: Charvieu-Chavagneux

Government
  - Mayor (2020–2026): Jean-Louis Sbaffe
- Area^{1}: 13.32 km^{2} (5.14 sq mi)
- Elevation: 232 m (761 ft)
- Highest elevation: 237 m (778 ft)
- Lowest elevation: 199 m (653 ft)
- Population (2023): 8,031
  - Density: 602.9/km^{2} (1,562/sq mi)
- Time zone: UTC+01:00 (CET)
  - Summer (DST): UTC+02:00 (CEST)
- INSEE/Postal code: 38507 /38230
- ^{1} French Land Register data, which excludes lakes, ponds, glaciers > 1 km^{2} (0.386 sq mi or 247 acres) and river estuaries.

Tignieu-Jameyzieu (French pronunciation: [tiɲø ʒamɛzjø]) is a commune in the Isère department in southeastern France.

== Geography ==
The Bourbre forms part of the commune's western border.

== Population ==
Historical population

Year	Pop.	±% p.a.
1793	406	—
1800	473	+2.21%
1806	493	+0.69%
1821	463	−0.42%
1831	596	+2.56%
1836	693	+3.06%
1841	940	+6.29%
1846	1,003	+1.31%
1851	1,102	+1.90%
1856	1,062	−0.74%
1861	1,056	−0.11%
1866	1,098	+0.78%
1872	871	−3.79%
1876	888	+0.48%
1881	895	+0.16%
1886	974	+1.71%
1891	1,015	+0.83%
1896	1,133	+2.22%
1901	1,202	+1.19%

Year	Pop.	±% p.a.
1906	1,392	+2.98%
1911	1,548	+2.15%
1921	1,563	+0.10%
1926	1,559	−0.05%
1931	1,617	+0.73%
1936	1,673	+0.68%
1946	1,563	−0.68%
1954	1,840	+2.06%
1962	2,030	+1.24%
1968	2,454	+3.21%
1975	2,959	+2.71%
1982	3,666	+3.11%
1990	4,616	+2.92%
1999	4,838	+0.52%
2007	5,435	+1.47%
2012	6,382	+3.26%
2017	7,249	+2.58%
2023	8,031	+1.72%

Source: EHESS and INSEE (1968-2023)

== See also ==
- Communes of the Isère department
