= Trept =

- Commune
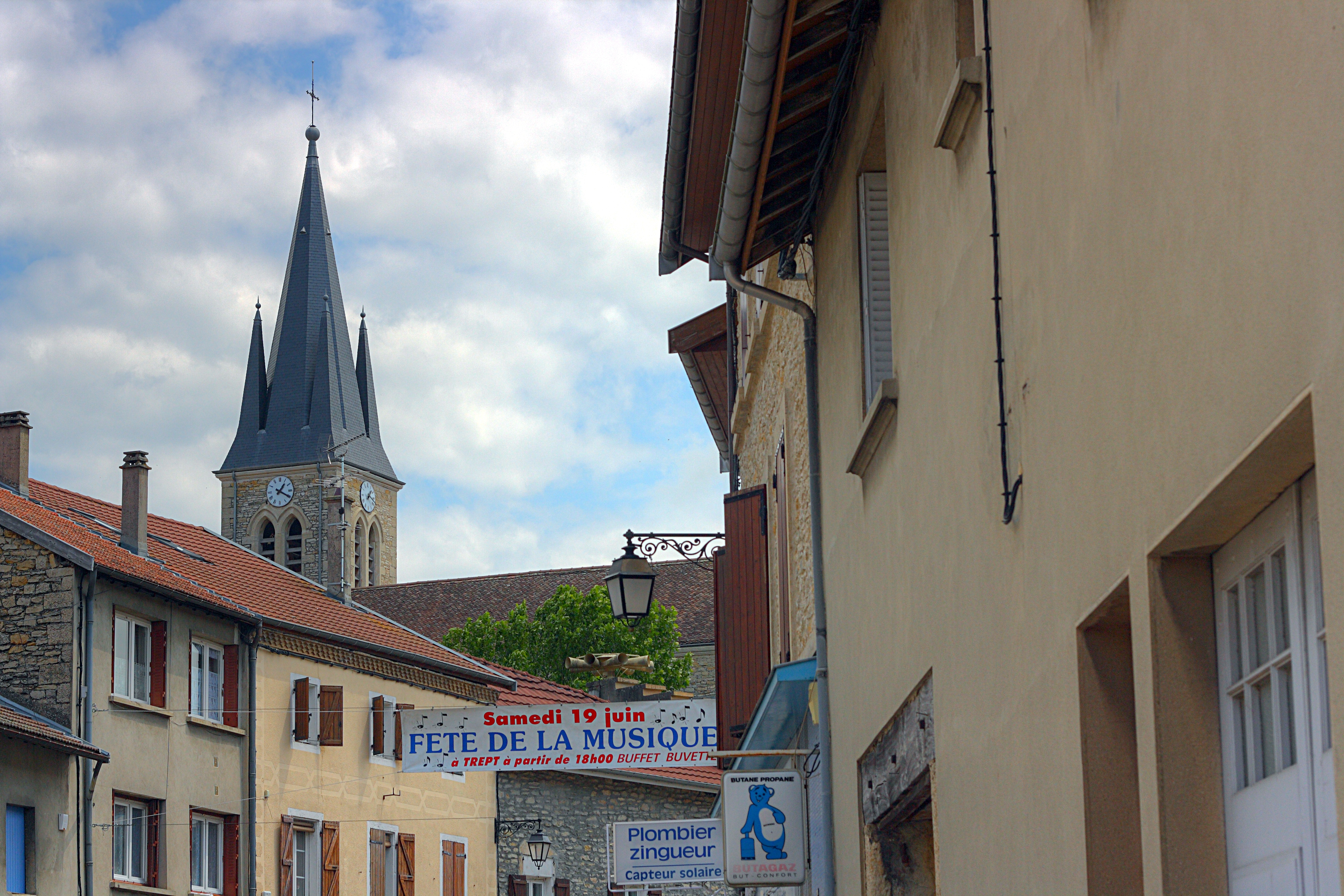
- The church and surroundings of Trept
- Location of Trept
- Location within France Location within Auvergne-Rhône-Alpes
- Coordinates: 45°41′14″N 5°19′14″E
- Country: France
- Region: Auvergne-Rhône-Alpes
- Department: Isère
- Arrondissement: La Tour-du-Pin
- Canton: Charvieu-Chavagneux

Government
  - Mayor (2020–2026): Eric Morel
- Area^{1}: 15.87 km^{2} (6.13 sq mi)
- Elevation: 270 m (890 ft)
- Highest elevation: 360 m (1,180 ft)
- Lowest elevation: 219 m (719 ft)
- Population (2023): 2,095
  - Density: 132.0/km^{2} (341.9/sq mi)
- Time zone: UTC+01:00 (CET)
  - Summer (DST): UTC+02:00 (CEST)
- INSEE/Postal code: 38515 /38460
- ^{1} French Land Register data, which excludes lakes, ponds, glaciers > 1 km^{2} (0.386 sq mi or 247 acres) and river estuaries.

Trept is a commune in the Isère department in southeastern France.

== Population ==
Historical population

Year	Pop.	±% p.a.
1793	784	—
1821	641	−0.72%
1846	1,167	+2.43%
1872	1,290	+0.39%
1901	1,732	+1.02%
1926	1,251	−1.29%
1946	931	−1.47%
1962	817	−0.81%
1968	840	+0.46%

Year	Pop.	±% p.a.
1975	853	+0.22%
1982	1,039	+2.86%
1990	1,164	+1.43%
1999	1,540	+3.16%
2007	1,717	+1.37%
2012	1,836	+1.35%
2017	2,170	+3.40%
2023	2,095	−0.58%

Source: EHESS and INSEE (1968-2023)

== See also ==
- Communes of the Isère department
