= Chozeau =

- Commune
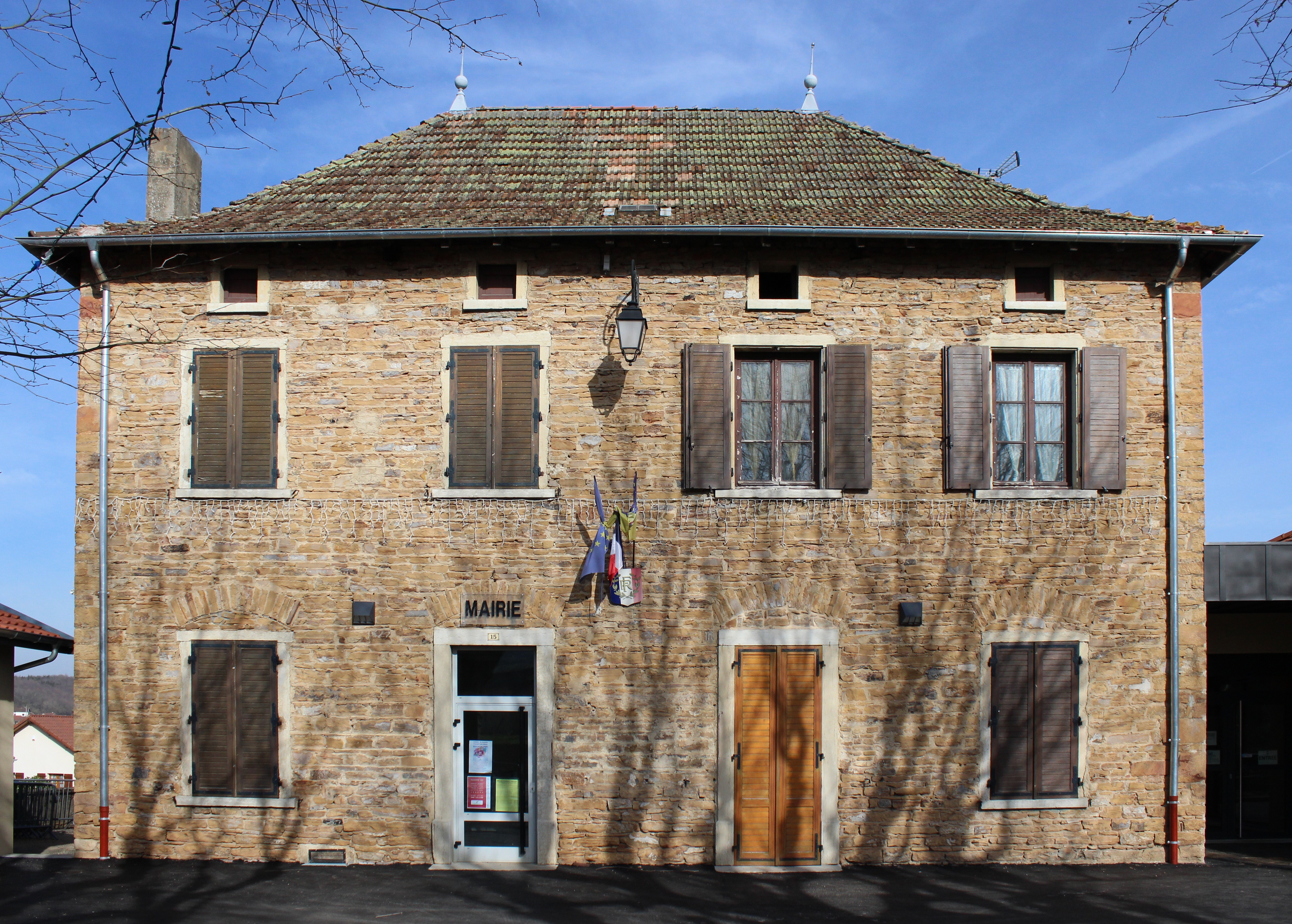
- The town hall of Chozeau
- Location of Chozeau
- Location within France Location within Auvergne-Rhône-Alpes
- Coordinates: 45°41′50″N 5°12′30″E
- Country: France
- Region: Auvergne-Rhône-Alpes
- Department: Isère
- Arrondissement: La Tour-du-Pin
- Canton: Charvieu-Chavagneux
- Intercommunality: Les Balcons du Dauphiné

Government
  - Mayor (2020–2026): Richard Arnaud
- Area^{1}: 8.3 km^{2} (3.2 sq mi)
- Elevation: 220 m (720 ft)
- Highest elevation: 416 m (1,365 ft)
- Lowest elevation: 204 m (669 ft)
- Population (2023): 987
  - Density: 120/km^{2} (310/sq mi)
- Time zone: UTC+01:00 (CET)
  - Summer (DST): UTC+02:00 (CEST)
- INSEE/Postal code: 38109 /38460
- ^{1} French Land Register data, which excludes lakes, ponds, glaciers > 1 km^{2} (0.386 sq mi or 247 acres) and river estuaries.

Chozeau (French pronunciation: [ʃozo]) is a commune in the Isère department in southeastern France.

== Population ==
Historical population
Year	Pop.	±% p.a.
1968	305	—
1975	427	+4.92%
1982	517	+2.77%
1990	618	+2.26%
1999	813	+3.09%
2007	996	+2.57%
2012	1,060	+1.25%
2017	1,064	+0.08%
2023	987	−1.24%
Source: INSEE

== See also ==
- Communes of the Isère department
