= Veyssilieu =

- Commune
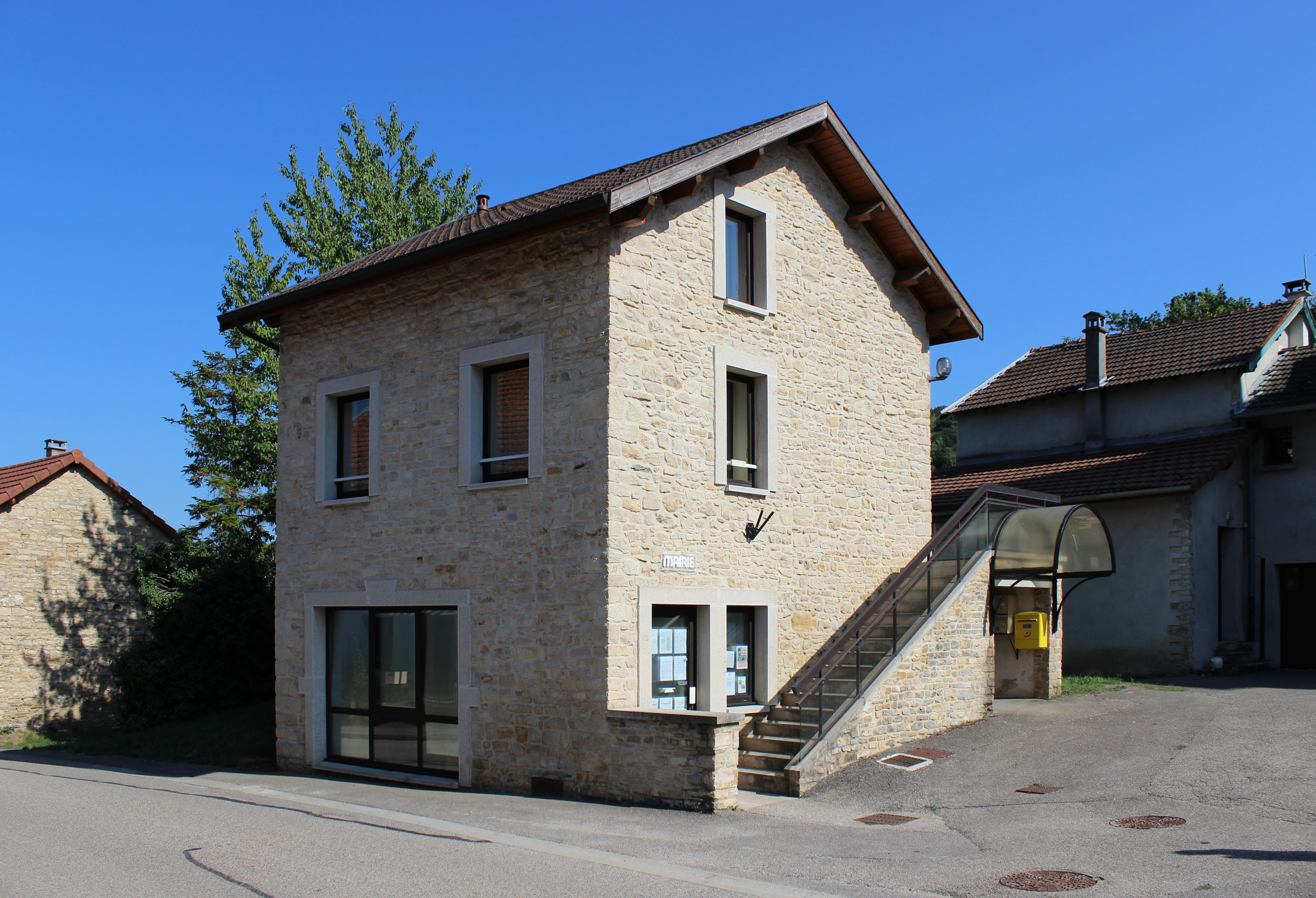
- The town hall of Veyssilieu
- Location of Veyssilieu
- Location within France Location within Auvergne-Rhône-Alpes
- Coordinates: 45°40′51″N 5°13′16″E
- Country: France
- Region: Auvergne-Rhône-Alpes
- Department: Isère
- Arrondissement: La Tour-du-Pin
- Canton: Charvieu-Chavagneux

Government
  - Mayor (2022–2026): Alexandra Contamin
- Area^{1}: 6.49 km^{2} (2.51 sq mi)
- Elevation: 285 m (935 ft)
- Highest elevation: 432 m (1,417 ft)
- Lowest elevation: 248 m (814 ft)
- Population (2023): 328
  - Density: 50.5/km^{2} (131/sq mi)
- Time zone: UTC+01:00 (CET)
  - Summer (DST): UTC+02:00 (CEST)
- INSEE/Postal code: 38542 /38460
- ^{1} French Land Register data, which excludes lakes, ponds, glaciers > 1 km^{2} (0.386 sq mi or 247 acres) and river estuaries.

Veyssilieu (French pronunciation: [vɛsiljø]) is a commune in the Isère department in southeastern France.

== Population ==
Historical population
Year	Pop.	±% p.a.
1968	83	—
1975	113	+4.51%
1982	172	+6.19%
1990	225	+3.41%
1999	240	+0.72%
2007	298	+2.74%
2012	286	−0.82%
2017	336	+3.27%
2023	328	−0.40%
Source: INSEE

== See also ==
- Communes of the Isère department
