= Panossas =

- Commune
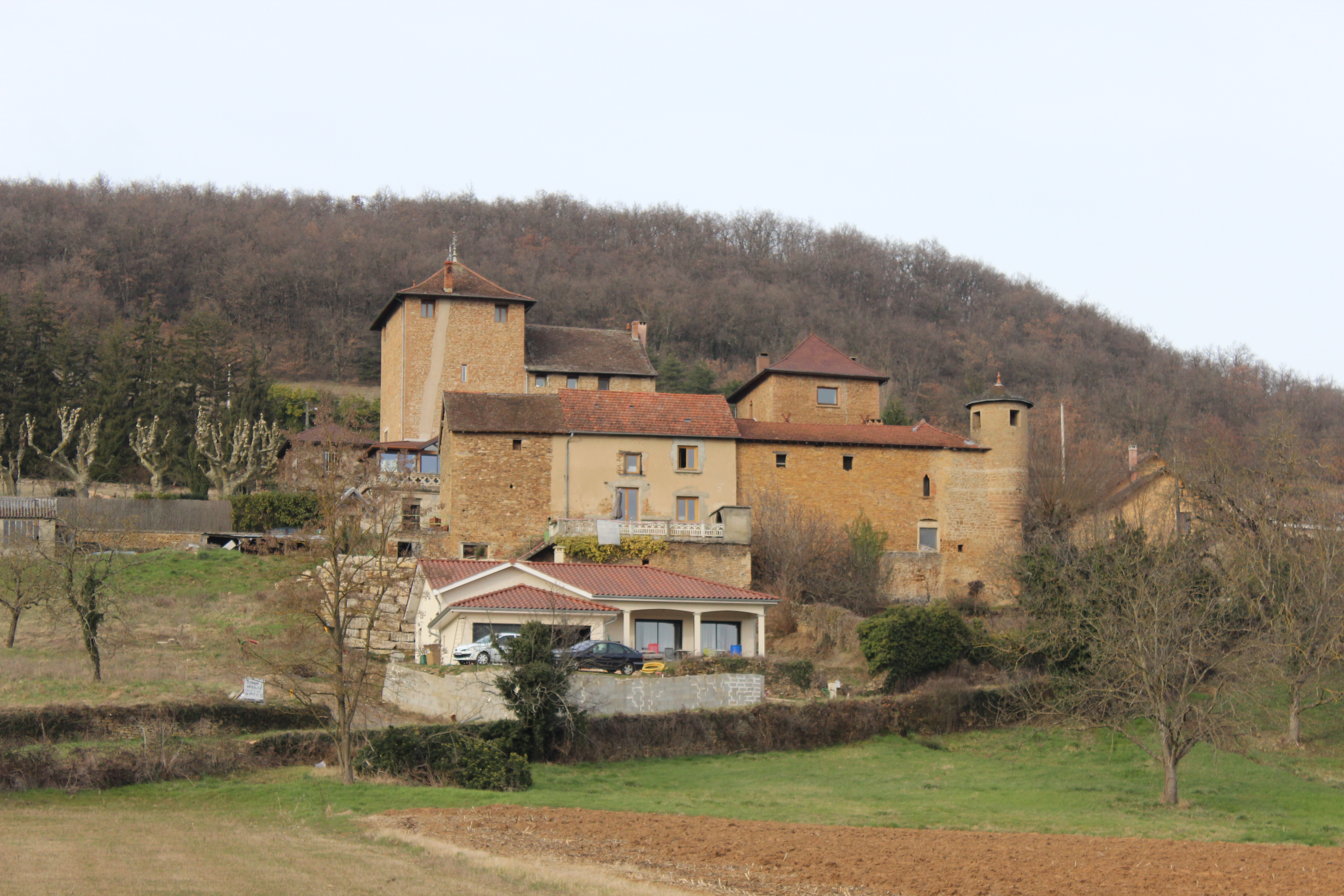
- The château of Antouillet, in Panossas
- Location of Panossas
- Location within France Location within Auvergne-Rhône-Alpes
- Coordinates: 45°40′46″N 5°12′17″E
- Country: France
- Region: Auvergne-Rhône-Alpes
- Department: Isère
- Arrondissement: La Tour-du-Pin
- Canton: Charvieu-Chavagneux

Government
  - Mayor (2024–2026): Christophe Candy
- Area^{1}: 7.99 km^{2} (3.08 sq mi)
- Highest elevation: 390 m (1,280 ft)
- Lowest elevation: 223 m (732 ft)
- Population (2023): 696
  - Density: 87.1/km^{2} (226/sq mi)
- Time zone: UTC+01:00 (CET)
  - Summer (DST): UTC+02:00 (CEST)
- INSEE/Postal code: 38294 /38460
- ^{1} French Land Register data, which excludes lakes, ponds, glaciers > 1 km^{2} (0.386 sq mi or 247 acres) and river estuaries.

Panossas (French pronunciation: [panɔsa]) is a commune in the Isère department in southeastern France.

== Population ==
Historical population
Year	Pop.	±% p.a.
1968	166	—
1975	187	+1.72%
1982	227	+2.81%
1990	346	+5.41%
1999	498	+4.13%
2007	563	+1.55%
2012	654	+3.04%
2017	666	+0.36%
2023	696	+0.74%
Source: INSEE

== See also ==
- Communes of the Isère department
