= Canton of Charvieu-Chavagneux =

Coordinates: 45.74°N 5.16°E

The canton of Charvieu-Chavagneux is an administrative division of the Isère department, eastern France. It was created at the French canton reorganisation which came into effect in March 2015. Its seat is in Charvieu-Chavagneux.

It consists of the following communes:

1. Annoisin-Chatelans
2. Anthon
3. Charvieu-Chavagneux
4. Chavanoz
5. Chozeau
6. Crémieu
7. Dizimieu
8. Hières-sur-Amby
9. Janneyrias
10. Leyrieu
11. Moras
12. Panossas
13. Pont-de-Chéruy
14. Saint-Baudille-de-la-Tour
15. Saint-Hilaire-de-Brens
16. Saint-Romain-de-Jalionas
17. Siccieu-Saint-Julien-et-Carisieu
18. Tignieu-Jameyzieu
19. Trept
20. Vénérieu
21. Vernas
22. Veyssilieu
23. Villemoirieu
24. Villette-d'Anthon
