= Villette-d'Anthon =

- Commune
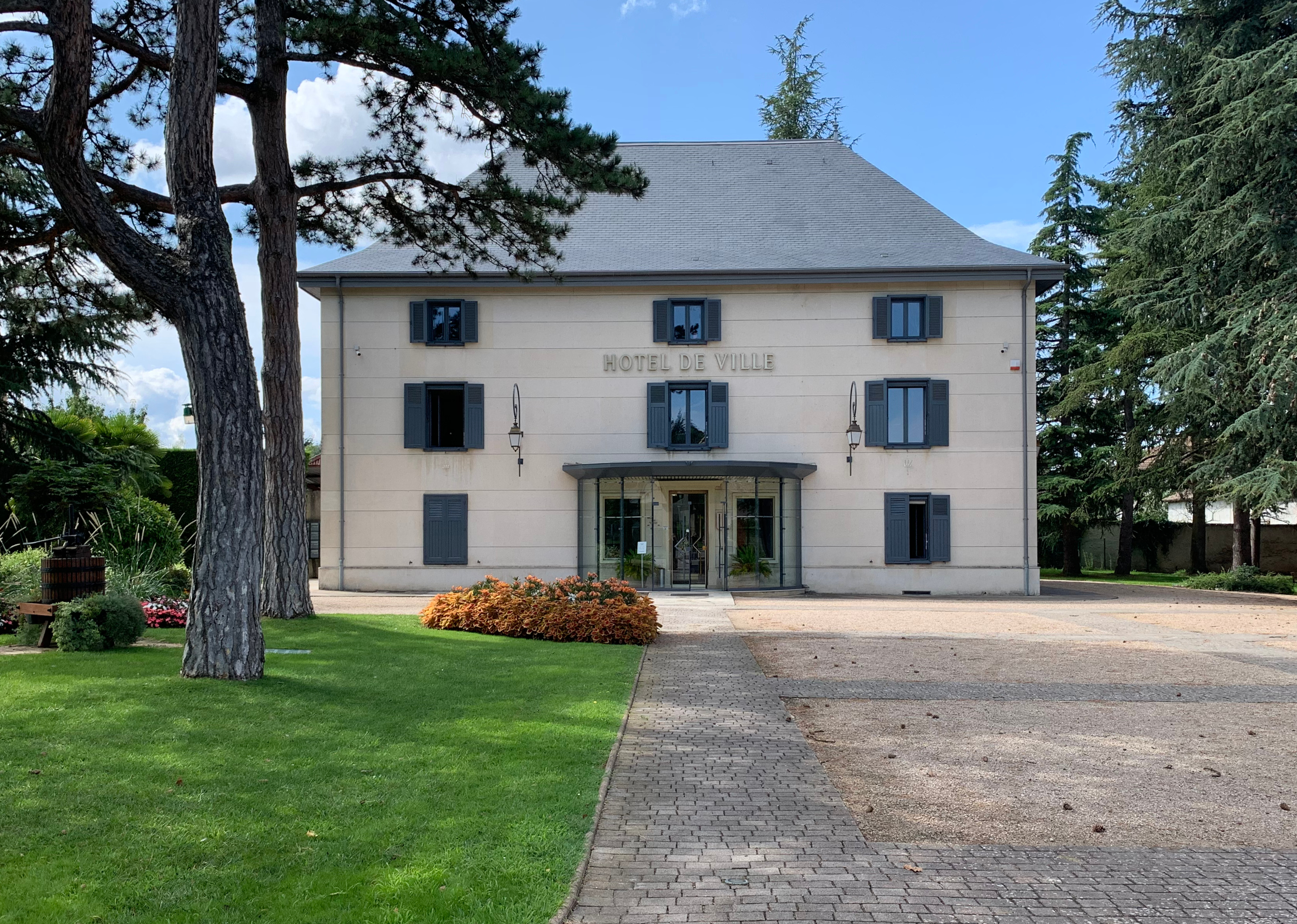
- Town hall, August 2019.

- Coat of arms
- Location of Villette-d'Anthon
- Location within France Location within Auvergne-Rhône-Alpes
- Coordinates: 45°47′46″N 5°07′00″E
- Country: France
- Region: Auvergne-Rhône-Alpes
- Department: Isère
- Arrondissement: La Tour-du-Pin
- Canton: Charvieu-Chavagneux
- Intercommunality: Lyon-Saint-Exupéry en Dauphiné

Government
  - Mayor (2020–2026): Bruno Gindre
- Area^{1}: 22.8 km^{2} (8.8 sq mi)
- Elevation: 227 m (745 ft)
- Highest elevation: 260 m (850 ft)
- Lowest elevation: 179 m (587 ft)
- Population (2023): 5,268
  - Density: 231/km^{2} (598/sq mi)
- Time zone: UTC+01:00 (CET)
  - Summer (DST): UTC+02:00 (CEST)
- INSEE/Postal code: 38557 /38280
- ^{1} French Land Register data, which excludes lakes, ponds, glaciers > 1 km^{2} (0.386 sq mi or 247 acres) and river estuaries.

Villette-d'Anthon (French pronunciation: [vilɛt dɑ̃tɔ̃]) is a commune in the Isère department in southeastern France.

== Population ==
Historical population

Year	Pop.	±% p.a.
1793	420	—
1800	742	+8.47%
1806	515	−5.90%
1821	698	+2.05%
1831	702	+0.06%
1836	785	+2.26%
1841	823	+0.95%
1846	802	−0.52%
1851	781	−0.53%
1856	865	+2.06%
1861	982	+2.57%
1866	982	+0.00%
1872	1,029	+0.78%
1876	1,032	+0.07%
1881	951	−1.62%
1886	987	+0.75%
1891	998	+0.22%
1896	937	−1.25%
1901	858	−1.75%

Year	Pop.	±% p.a.
1906	733	−3.10%
1911	665	−1.93%
1921	678	+0.19%
1926	669	−0.27%
1931	643	−0.79%
1936	626	−0.53%
1946	584	−0.69%
1954	580	−0.09%
1962	646	+1.36%
1968	861	+4.90%
1975	1,334	+6.45%
1982	2,711	+10.66%
1990	3,534	+3.37%
1999	3,906	+1.12%
2007	4,143	+0.74%
2012	4,524	+1.78%
2017	4,936	+1.76%
2023	5,268	+1.09%

Source: EHESS and INSEE (1968-2023)

== See also ==
- Communes of the Isère department
