= Leyrieu =

- Commune
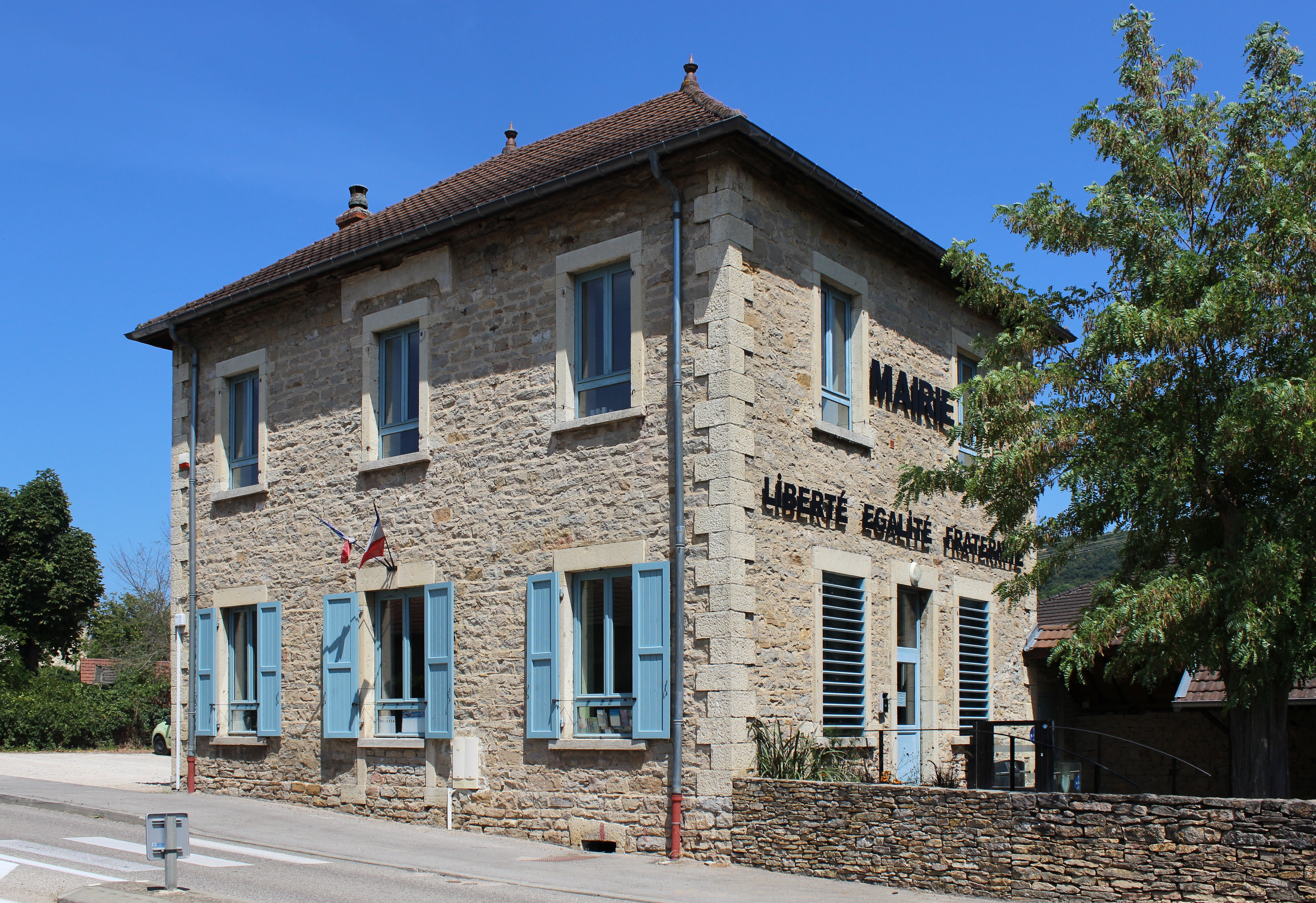
- The town hall of Leyrieu
- Location of Leyrieu
- Location within France Location within Auvergne-Rhône-Alpes
- Coordinates: 45°45′25″N 5°15′18″E
- Country: France
- Region: Auvergne-Rhône-Alpes
- Department: Isère
- Arrondissement: La Tour-du-Pin
- Canton: Charvieu-Chavagneux

Government
  - Mayor (2020–2026): Jean-Yves Brenier
- Area^{1}: 6.39 km^{2} (2.47 sq mi)
- Population (2023): 919
  - Density: 144/km^{2} (372/sq mi)
- Time zone: UTC+01:00 (CET)
  - Summer (DST): UTC+02:00 (CEST)
- INSEE/Postal code: 38210 /38460
- ^{1} French Land Register data, which excludes lakes, ponds, glaciers > 1 km^{2} (0.386 sq mi or 247 acres) and river estuaries.

Leyrieu (French pronunciation: [lɛʁjø]) is a commune in the Isère department in southeastern France.

== Population ==
Historical population
Year	Pop.	±% p.a.
1968	230	—
1975	300	+3.87%
1982	376	+3.28%
1990	461	+2.58%
1999	643	+3.77%
2007	706	+1.18%
2012	767	+1.67%
2017	838	+1.79%
2023	919	+1.55%
Source: INSEE

== See also ==
- Communes of the Isère department
