= Dizimieu =

- Commune
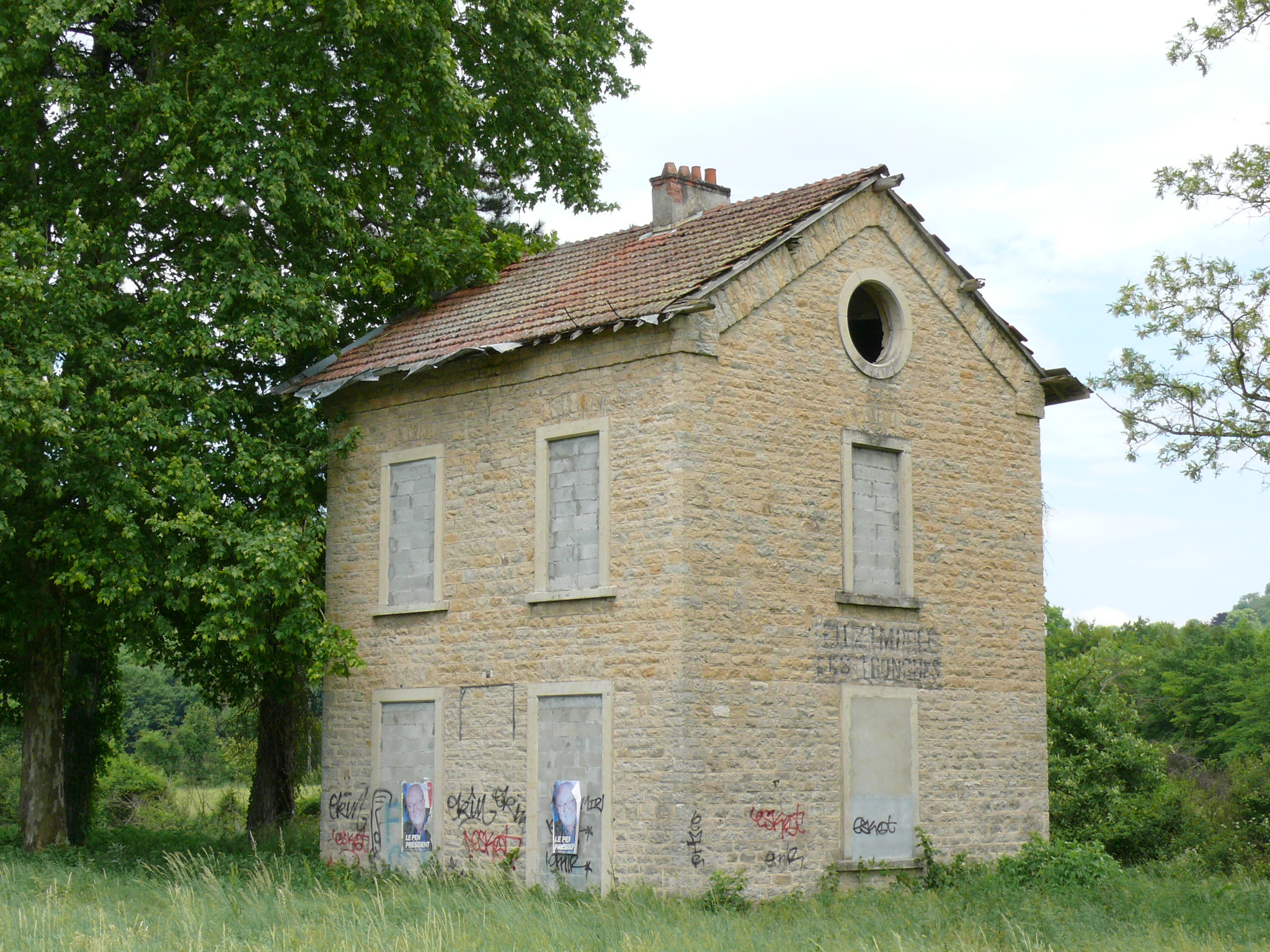
- Former train station

- Coat of arms
- Location of Dizimieu
- Location within France Location within Auvergne-Rhône-Alpes
- Coordinates: 45°43′10″N 5°17′57″E
- Country: France
- Region: Auvergne-Rhône-Alpes
- Department: Isère
- Arrondissement: La Tour-du-Pin
- Canton: Charvieu-Chavagneux
- Intercommunality: Les Balcons du Dauphiné

Government
  - Mayor (2023–2026): Luc Nguyen
- Area^{1}: 9.74 km^{2} (3.76 sq mi)
- Elevation: 263 m (863 ft)
- Highest elevation: 417 m (1,368 ft)
- Lowest elevation: 230 m (750 ft)
- Population (2023): 835
  - Density: 85.7/km^{2} (222/sq mi)
- Time zone: UTC+01:00 (CET)
  - Summer (DST): UTC+02:00 (CEST)
- INSEE/Postal code: 38146 /38460
- ^{1} French Land Register data, which excludes lakes, ponds, glaciers > 1 km^{2} (0.386 sq mi or 247 acres) and river estuaries.

Dizimieu (French pronunciation: [dizimjø]) is a commune in the Isère department in southeastern France.

== Population ==
Historical population
Year	Pop.	±% p.a.
1968	249	—
1975	238	−0.64%
1982	306	+3.66%
1990	398	+3.34%
1999	496	+2.48%
2007	613	+2.68%
2012	704	+2.81%
2017	837	+3.52%
2023	835	−0.04%
Source: INSEE

== See also ==
- Communes of the Isère department
