= Hières-sur-Amby =

- Commune
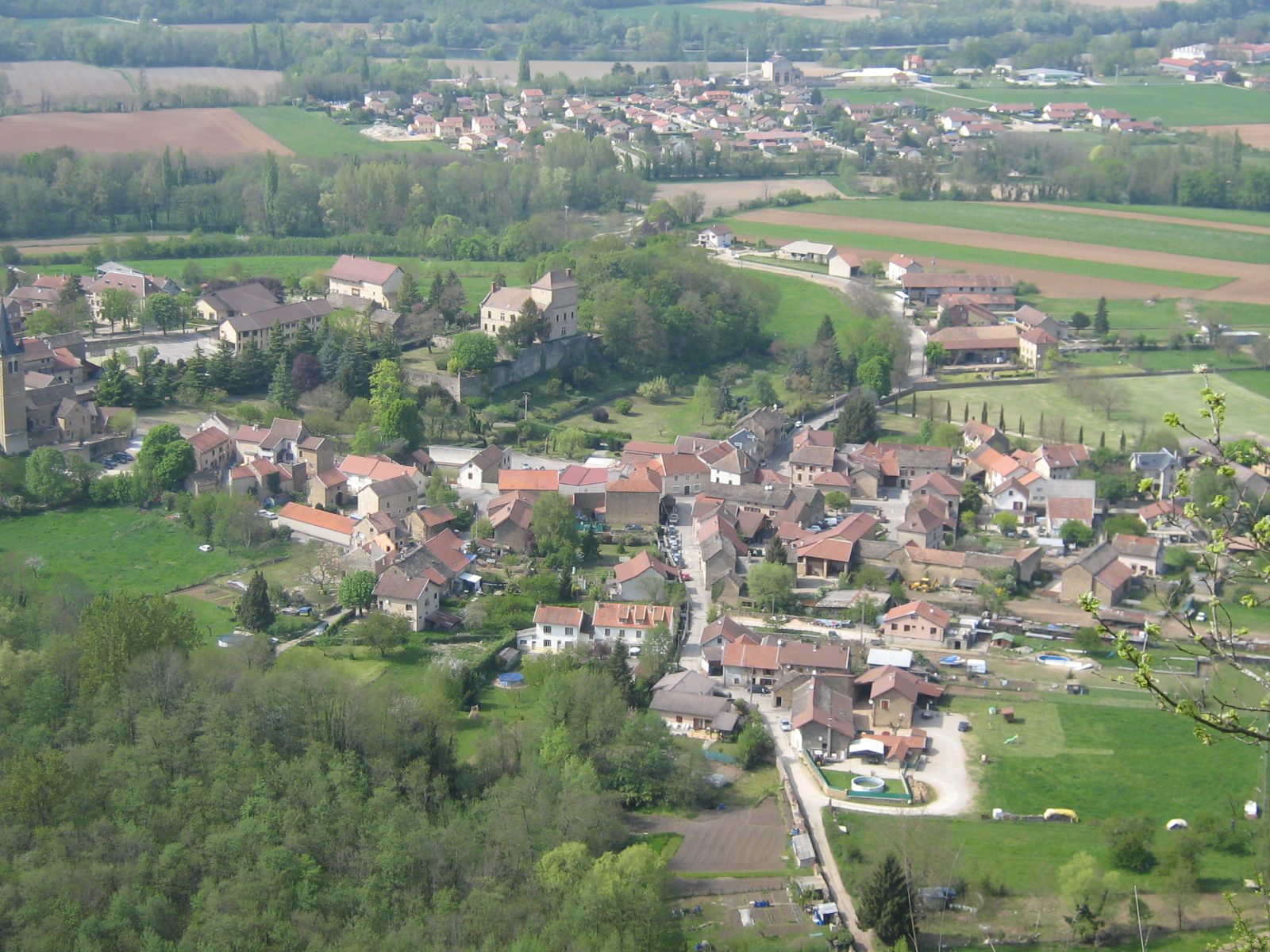
- A general view of Hières-sur-Amby
- Location of Hières-sur-Amby
- Location within France Location within Auvergne-Rhône-Alpes
- Coordinates: 45°47′54″N 5°17′41″E
- Country: France
- Region: Auvergne-Rhône-Alpes
- Department: Isère
- Arrondissement: La Tour-du-Pin
- Canton: Charvieu-Chavagneux
- Intercommunality: Les Balcons du Dauphiné

Government
  - Mayor (2021–2026): Philippe Psaila
- Area^{1}: 8.73 km^{2} (3.37 sq mi)
- Elevation: 220 m (720 ft)
- Highest elevation: 429 m (1,407 ft)
- Lowest elevation: 193 m (633 ft)
- Population (2023): 1,245
  - Density: 143/km^{2} (369/sq mi)
- Time zone: UTC+01:00 (CET)
  - Summer (DST): UTC+02:00 (CEST)
- INSEE/Postal code: 38190 /38118
- ^{1} French Land Register data, which excludes lakes, ponds, glaciers > 1 km^{2} (0.386 sq mi or 247 acres) and river estuaries.

Hières-sur-Amby (French pronunciation: [jɛʁ syʁ ɑ̃bi]) is a commune in the Isère department in southeastern France.

== Population ==
Historical population
| Year | Pop. | ±% p.a. |
|---|---|---|
| 1968 | 640 | — |
| 1975 | 747 | +2.23% |
| 1982 | 835 | +1.60% |
| 1990 | 925 | +1.29% |
| 1999 | 998 | +0.85% |
| 2007 | 1,136 | +1.63% |
| 2012 | 1,200 | +1.10% |
| 2017 | 1,192 | −0.13% |
| 2023 | 1,245 | +0.73% |
Source: INSEE

== See also ==
- Communes of the Isère department
