= Siccieu-Saint-Julien-et-Carisieu =

- Commune
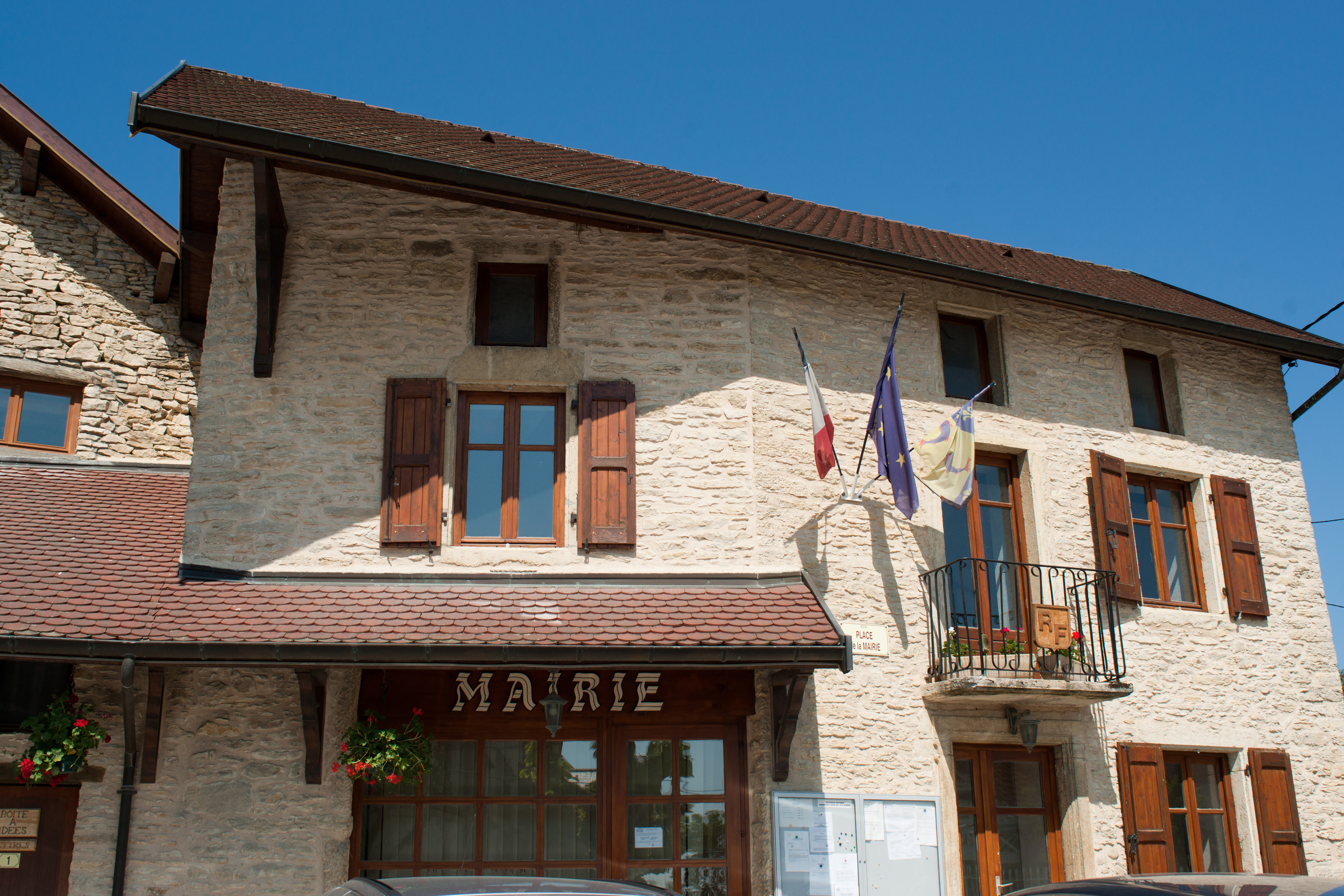
- The town hall of Siccieu-Saint-Julien-et-Carisieu
- Location of Siccieu-Saint-Julien-et-Carisieu
- Location within France Location within Auvergne-Rhône-Alpes
- Coordinates: 45°44′09″N 5°19′01″E
- Country: France
- Region: Auvergne-Rhône-Alpes
- Department: Isère
- Arrondissement: La Tour-du-Pin
- Canton: Charvieu-Chavagneux
- Intercommunality: Les Balcons du Dauphiné

Government
  - Mayor (2020–2026): Yvon Roller
- Area^{1}: 14.22 km^{2} (5.49 sq mi)
- Elevation: 335 m (1,099 ft)
- Highest elevation: 417 m (1,368 ft)
- Lowest elevation: 237 m (778 ft)
- Population (2023): 609
  - Density: 42.8/km^{2} (111/sq mi)
- Time zone: UTC+01:00 (CET)
  - Summer (DST): UTC+02:00 (CEST)
- INSEE/Postal code: 38488 /38460
- ^{1} French Land Register data, which excludes lakes, ponds, glaciers > 1 km^{2} (0.386 sq mi or 247 acres) and river estuaries.

Siccieu-Saint-Julien-et-Carisieu (French pronunciation: [sisjø sɛ̃ ʒyljɛ̃ e kaʁizjø]) is a commune in the Isère department in southeastern France.

== Population ==
Historical population
Year	Pop.	±% p.a.
1968	247	—
1975	256	+0.51%
1982	301	+2.34%
1990	377	+2.85%
1999	496	+3.10%
2007	560	+1.53%
2012	614	+1.86%
2017	583	−1.03%
2023	609	+0.73%
Source: INSEE

== See also ==
- Communes of the Isère department
