= Villemoirieu =

- Commune
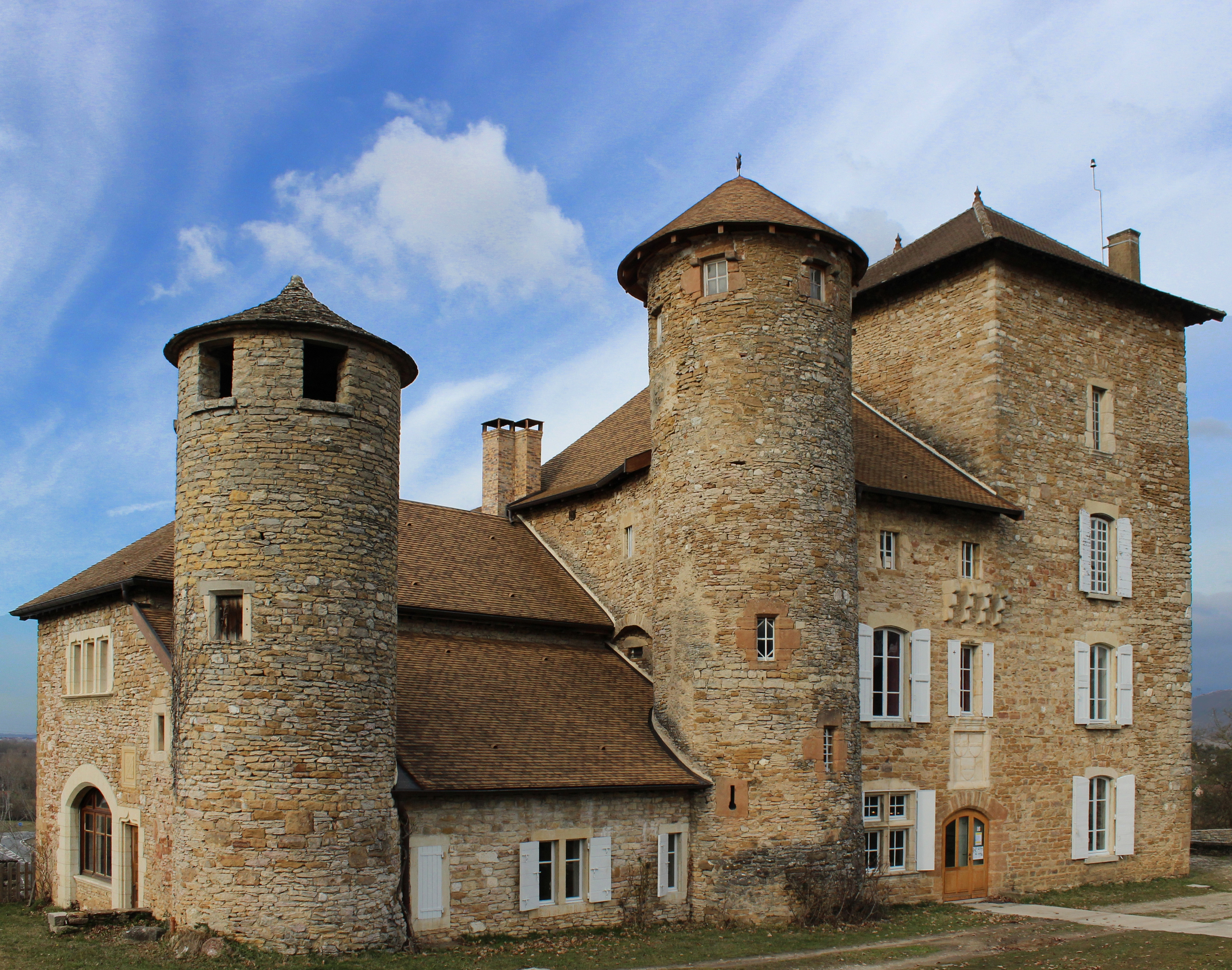
- Templar commandery
- Location of Villemoirieu
- Location within France Location within Auvergne-Rhône-Alpes
- Coordinates: 45°43′00″N 5°14′15″E
- Country: France
- Region: Auvergne-Rhône-Alpes
- Department: Isère
- Arrondissement: La Tour-du-Pin
- Canton: Charvieu-Chavagneux
- Intercommunality: Les Balcons du Dauphiné

Government
  - Mayor (2021–2026): Jacques Bracco
- Area^{1}: 13.29 km^{2} (5.13 sq mi)
- Elevation: 220 m (720 ft)
- Highest elevation: 425 m (1,394 ft)
- Lowest elevation: 203 m (666 ft)
- Population (2023): 1,925
  - Density: 144.8/km^{2} (375.1/sq mi)
- Time zone: UTC+01:00 (CET)
  - Summer (DST): UTC+02:00 (CEST)
- INSEE/Postal code: 38554 /38460
- ^{1} French Land Register data, which excludes lakes, ponds, glaciers > 1 km^{2} (0.386 sq mi or 247 acres) and river estuaries.

Villemoirieu (French pronunciation: [vil.mwaʁjø]) is a commune in the Isère department in southeastern France.

== Population ==
Historical population
Year	Pop.	±% p.a.
1968	409	—
1975	511	+3.23%
1982	1,218	+13.21%
1990	1,305	+0.87%
1999	1,392	+0.72%
2007	1,759	+2.97%
2012	1,834	+0.84%
2017	1,852	+0.20%
2023	1,925	+0.65%
Source: INSEE

== See also ==
- Communes of the Isère department
