= Agnin =

- Commune
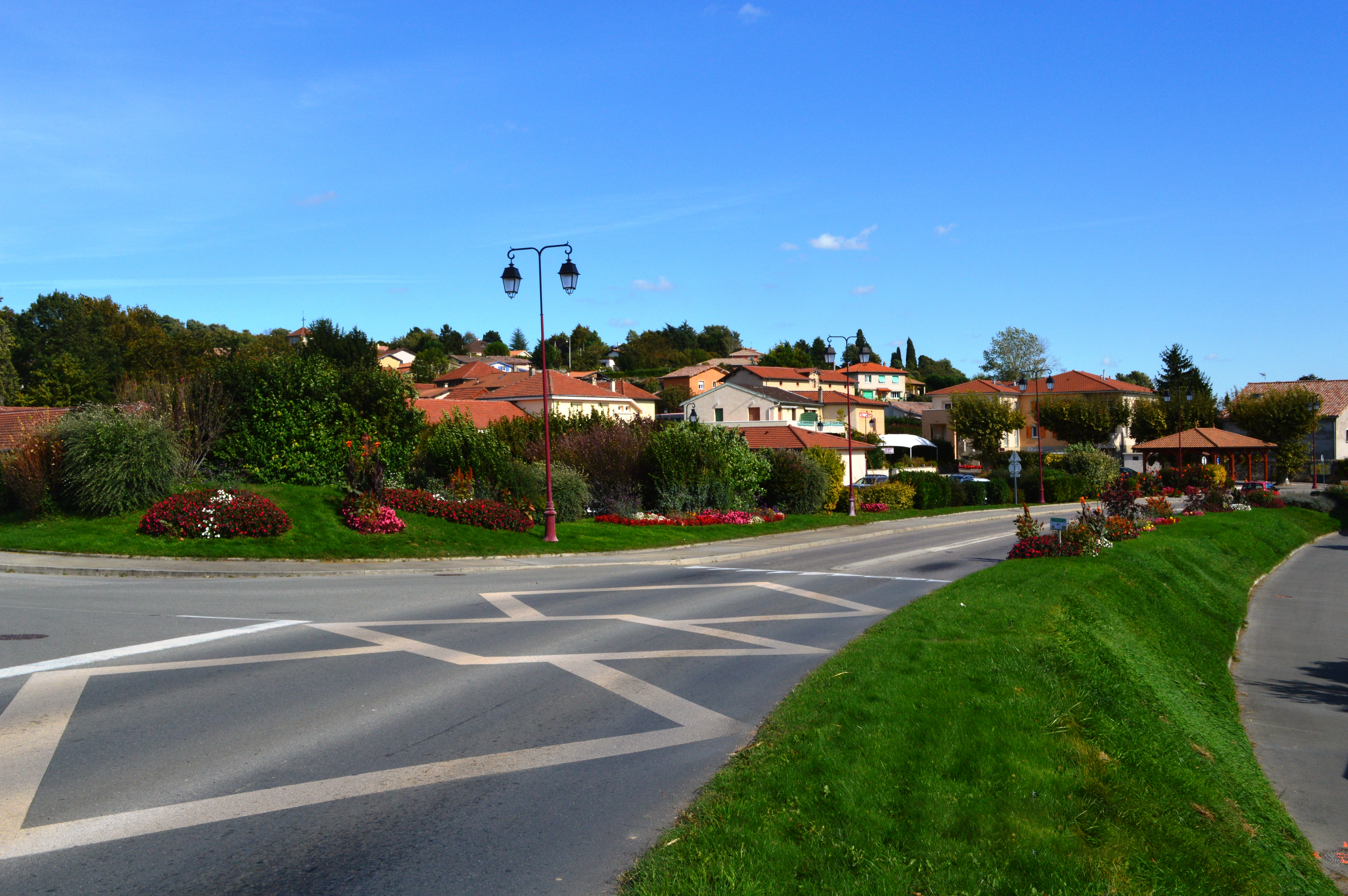
- A street in Agnin

- Coat of arms
- Location of Agnin
- Location within France Location within Auvergne-Rhône-Alpes
- Coordinates: 45°20′28″N 4°51′28″E
- Country: France
- Region: Auvergne-Rhône-Alpes
- Department: Isère
- Arrondissement: Vienne
- Canton: Roussillon
- Intercommunality: Entre Bièvre et Rhône

Government
  - Mayor (2020–2026): Christian Monteyremard
- Area^{1}: 7.96 km^{2} (3.07 sq mi)
- Highest elevation: 331 m (1,086 ft)
- Lowest elevation: 167 m (548 ft)
- Population (2023): 1,245
  - Density: 156/km^{2} (405/sq mi)
- Time zone: UTC+01:00 (CET)
  - Summer (DST): UTC+02:00 (CEST)
- INSEE/Postal code: 38003 /38150
- ^{1} French Land Register data, which excludes lakes, ponds, glaciers > 1 km^{2} (0.386 sq mi or 247 acres) and river estuaries.

Agnin (French pronunciation: [aɲɛ̃]) is a commune in the Isère department in the Auvergne-Rhône-Alpes region of south-eastern France.

The commune has been awarded one flower by the National Council of Towns and Villages in Bloom in the Competition of cities and villages in Bloom.

== Geography ==
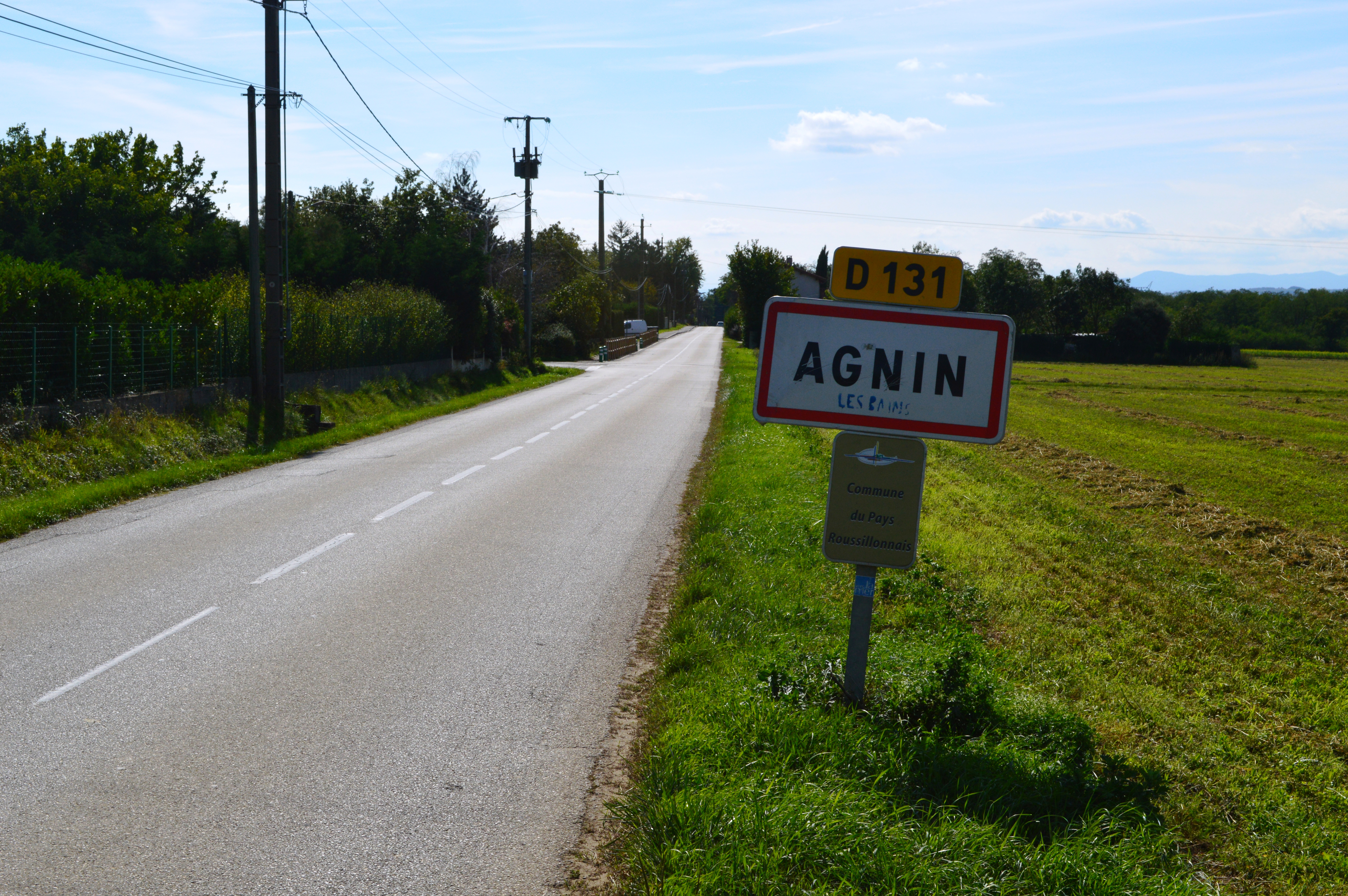
The entry to Agnin

Agnin is located some 25 km south of Vienne and 5 km north-east of Saint-Rambert-d'Albon. It can be accessed by the road D519 from near Chanas in the west passing through the southern part of the commune and continuing to Bouge-Chambalud. Parallel to this road in the north of the commune is the D51 road from Salaise-sur-Sanne in the west passing through the commune and the village and continuing to Anjou in the east. The D131 also comes from the Ville-sous-Anjou in the north joining the D51 west of the village. The Route de Bouge connects the village to the D519 in the south of the commune. The commune is mostly farmland with significant areas of housing in the north and some small areas of forest in the south.

An unnamed stream flows south forming the western border of the commune and another unnamed stream flows through the commune then forms the south-western border. They both join in the south-west and continue flowing west. The Dolon stream forms the southern border of the commune

== Toponymy ==
Like the nearby town of Anjou the origin of the name Agnin comes from the name of a Roman noble Anianus who owned vast territory in that era. The name of the town changed a few centuries later to Agnino which was the name used in the 11th century to describe this commune. Then over the following centuries Agnino became the Agnin known today.

== Heraldry ==
[[Image:|120px|center|Arms of Agnin]]	Blazon: Party per bend sinister, one of Or a local church soutenu at dexter by an inescutcheon with two keys saltirewise and sinister in chief a Vol all represented in lines; two of gules a dolphin of Or at dexter and a rose gules stalked and leaved in vert; in the cotice a bend sinister in Or charged with the letters AGNIN in sable debruised on the division.

== Administration ==
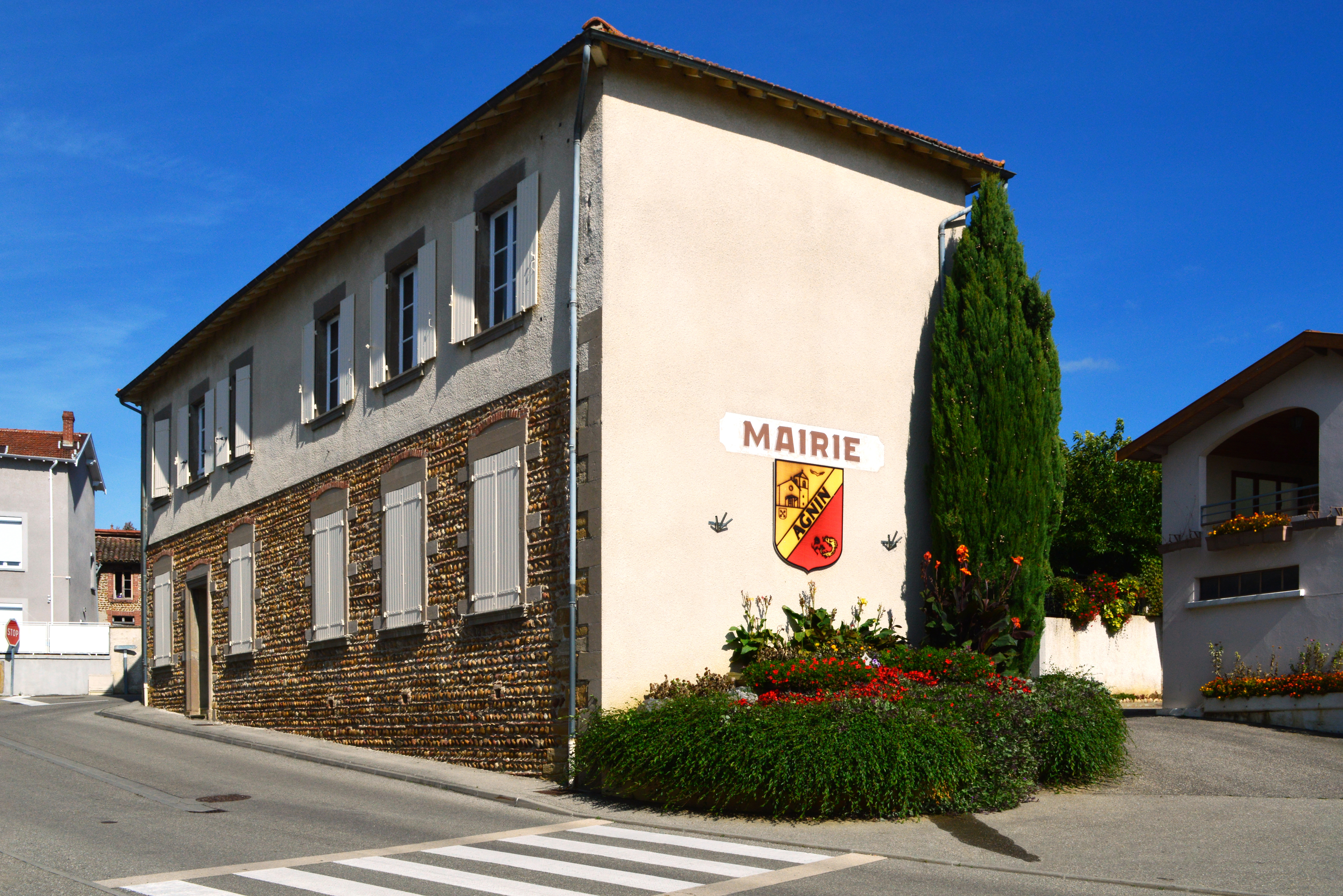
The Town Hall

List of Successive Mayors of Agnin

From	To	Name
2001	2008	Gérard Giraud
2008	2026	Christian Monteyremard

== Population ==
The inhabitants of the commune are known as Agnitaires in French.

Historical population

Year	Pop.	±% p.a.
1800	459	—
1821	738	+2.29%
1846	717	−0.12%
1872	572	−0.87%
1901	525	−0.30%
1926	432	−0.78%
1946	457	+0.28%
1962	460	+0.04%
1968	462	+0.07%

Year	Pop.	±% p.a.
1975	505	+1.28%
1982	605	+2.61%
1990	648	+0.86%
1999	789	+2.21%
2007	903	+1.70%
2012	1,026	+2.59%
2017	1,106	+1.51%
2023	1,245	+1.99%

Source: EHESS and INSEE

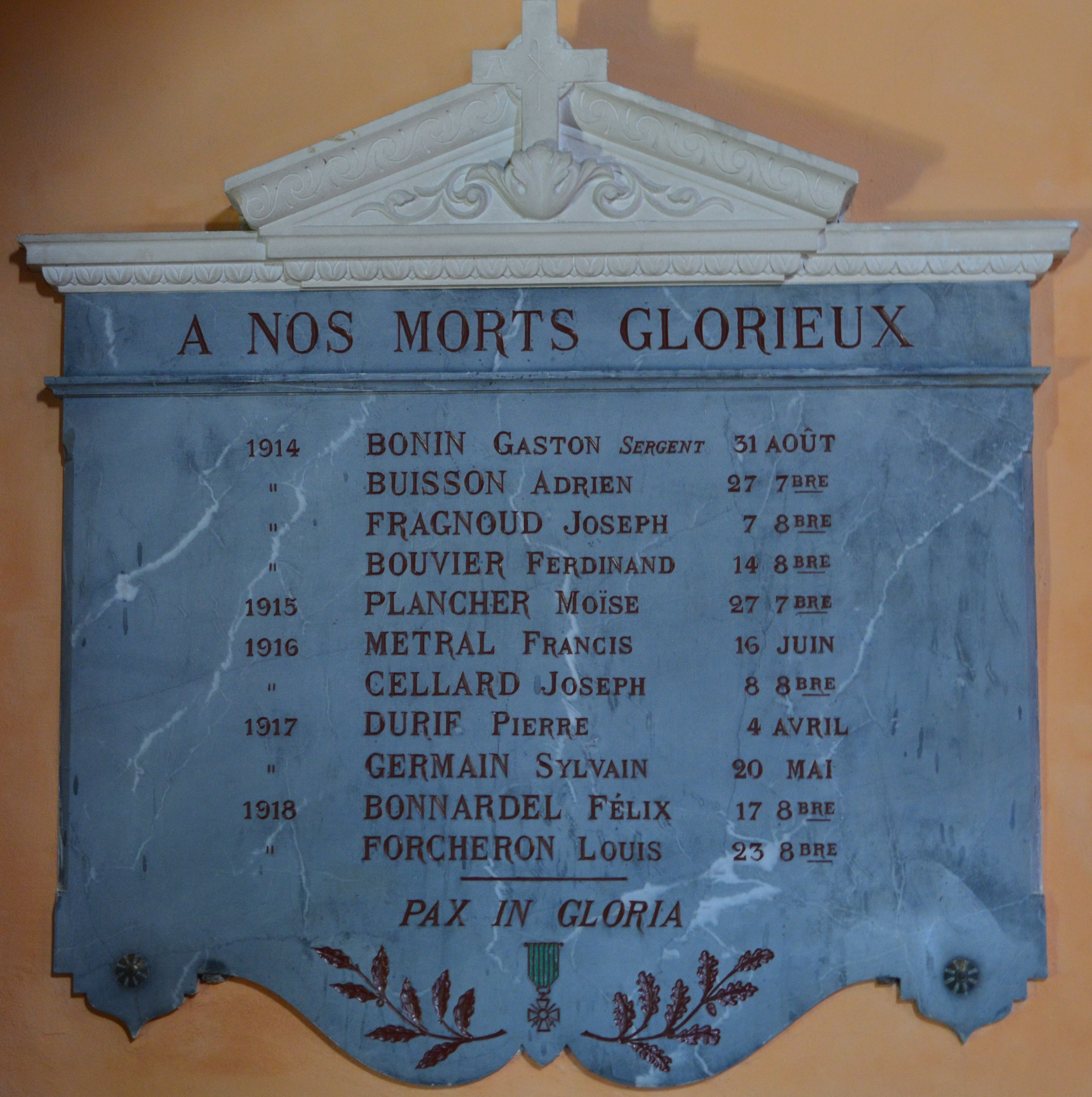
The War Memorial in the Church

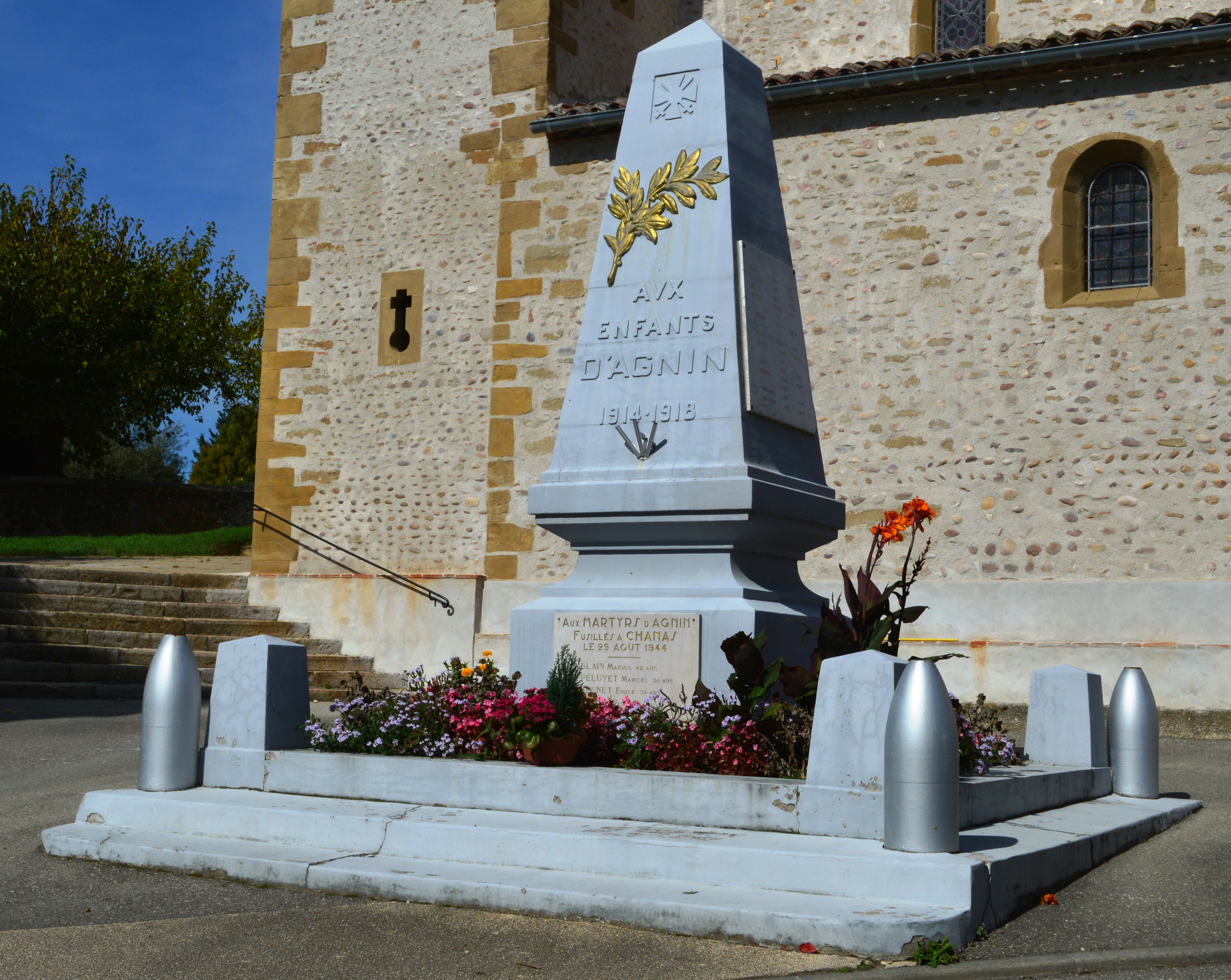
Agnin War Memorial

== Sites and Monuments ==
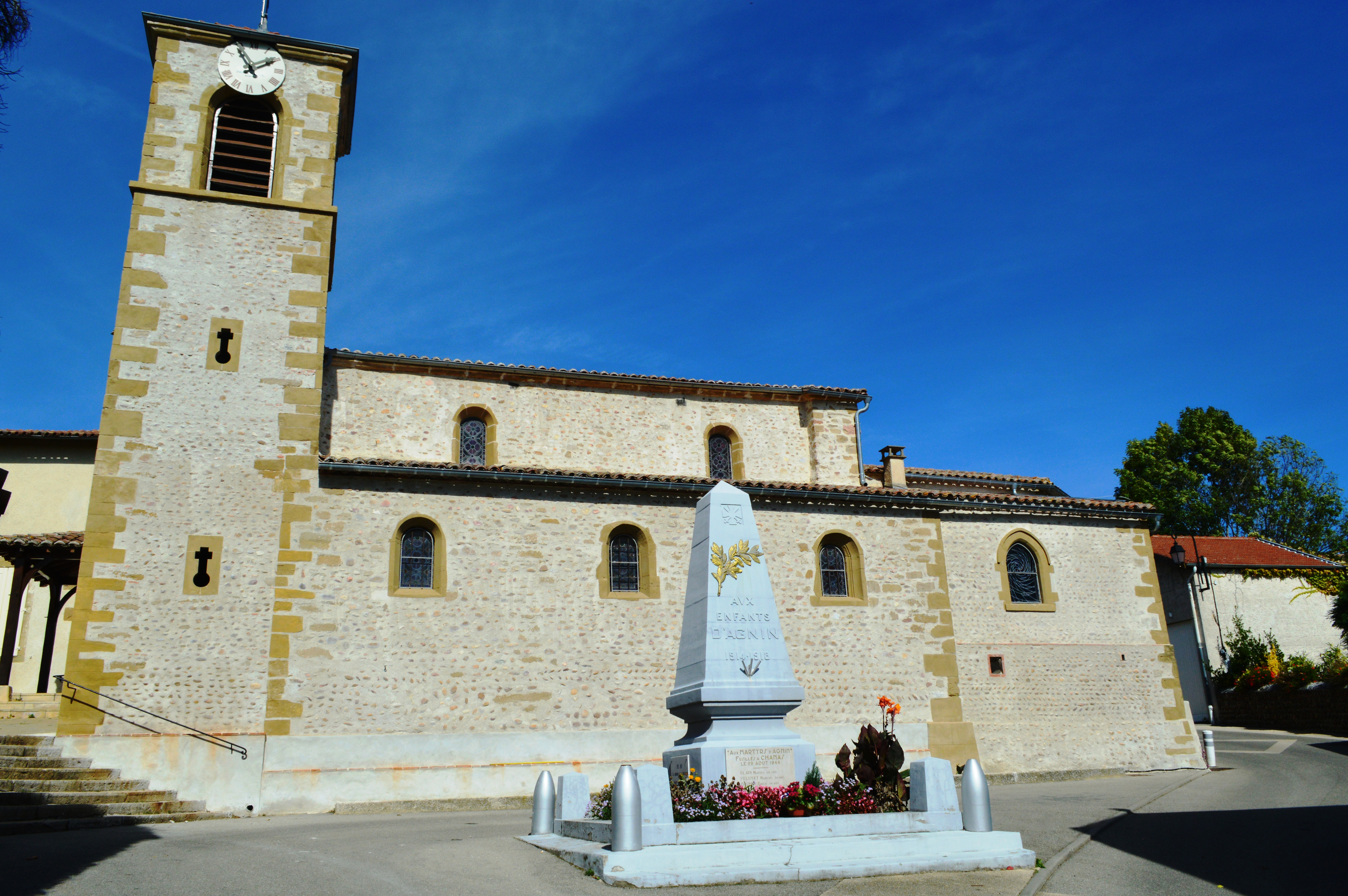
Agnin Church

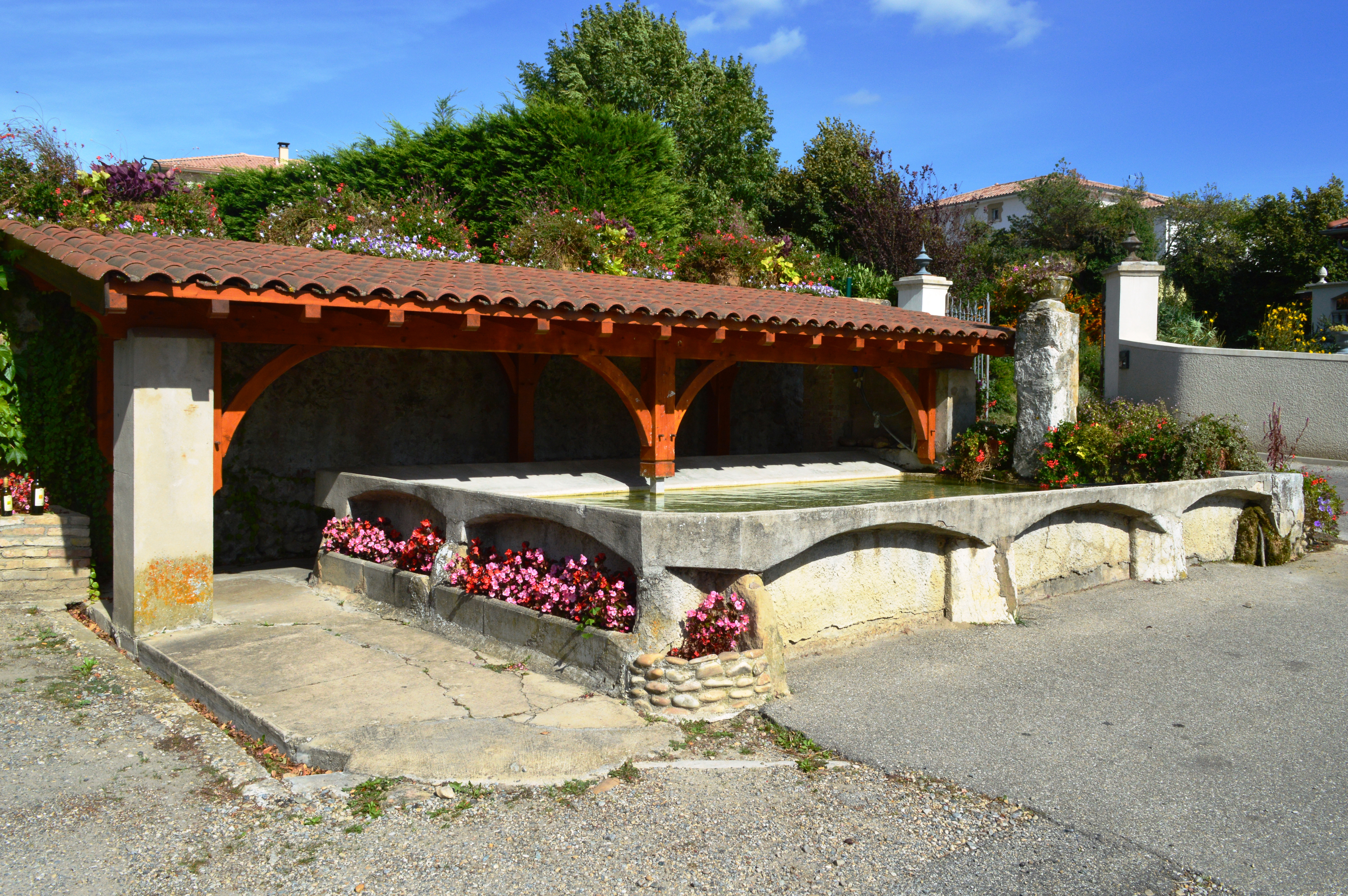
Agnin Lavoir (Public Laundry)

- The portal and tower of Bâtie Manor are registered as historical monuments.
- Gaulas Castle
- A Church from the 12th century
- Typical houses
- Gallo-Roman remains at Golat

== See also ==
- Communes of the Isère department
