= Anjou, Isère =

Anjou
- Commune
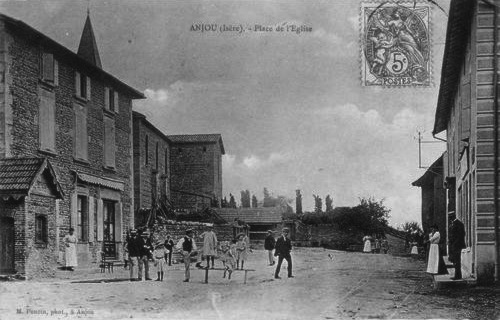
- The Church Square in the 19th century

- Coat of arms
- Location of Anjou
- Location within France Location within Auvergne-Rhône-Alpes
- Coordinates: 45°20′52″N 4°52′56″E
- Country: France
- Region: Auvergne-Rhône-Alpes
- Department: Isère
- Arrondissement: Vienne
- Canton: Roussillon
- Intercommunality: Entre Bièvre et Rhône

Government
  - Mayor (2025–2026): Christine Morel
- Area^{1}: 5.03 km^{2} (1.94 sq mi)
- Highest elevation: 383 m (1,257 ft)
- Lowest elevation: 218 m (715 ft)
- Population (2023): 1,031
  - Density: 205/km^{2} (531/sq mi)
- Time zone: UTC+01:00 (CET)
  - Summer (DST): UTC+02:00 (CEST)
- INSEE/Postal code: 38009 /38150
- ^{1} French Land Register data, which excludes lakes, ponds, glaciers > 1 km^{2} (0.386 sq mi or 247 acres) and river estuaries.

Anjou (French pronunciation: [ɑ̃ʒu]) is a commune in the Isère department, region of Auvergne-Rhône-Alpes, southeastern France.

== Geography ==
Anjou is a commune located in Bas-Dauphiné, some 6 km east by south-east of Roussillon and 10 km north-east of Saint-Rambert-d'Albon. Resting on a south-facing hill and partially sheltered from rain by the peaks of the Pilat mountain range, it benefits from a mild and sunny climate. For many decades, the beauty of its location has drawn numerous tourists and many others who reside in the village.

Access to the commune is by the D51 road from Agnin in the west passing through the commune and the village and continuing to Sonnay in the east.

The Ruisseau de la Ronzee passes through the north of the commune from east to west joining the Ruisseau de la Vescia which forms part of the northern border of the commune and which has several tributaries rising in the commune. An unnamed stream forms the southern border of the commune flowing from east to west.

=== Heraldry ===
Arms of Anjou	Blazon: Gules, an eagle Argent.

== Administration ==
List of Successive Mayors

From	To	Name
2001	2008	Michel Morel
2008	2020	Denis Rozier
2020	2026	Jean Michel Dolphin

== Demography ==
The inhabitants of the commune are known as Anjoulois or Anjouloises in French.

Historical population

Year	Pop.	±% p.a.
1800	900	—
1806	1,196	+4.85%
1821	825	−2.45%
1831	908	+0.96%
1836	927	+0.42%
1841	872	−1.22%
1846	856	−0.37%
1851	860	+0.09%
1856	900	+0.91%
1861	851	−1.11%
1866	835	−0.38%
1872	801	−0.69%
1876	753	−1.53%
1881	720	−0.89%
1886	691	−0.82%
1891	676	−0.44%
1896	636	−1.21%
1901	614	−0.70%

Year	Pop.	±% p.a.
1906	591	−0.76%
1911	558	−1.14%
1921	522	−0.66%
1926	524	+0.08%
1931	522	−0.08%
1936	503	−0.74%
1946	454	−1.02%
1954	605	+3.65%
1962	535	−1.53%
1968	565	+0.91%
1975	505	−1.59%
1982	585	+2.12%
1990	744	+3.05%
1999	809	+0.93%
2007	950	+2.03%
2012	1,016	+1.35%
2017	1,013	−0.06%
2023	1,031	+0.29%

Source: EHESS and INSEE

== Sites and monuments ==
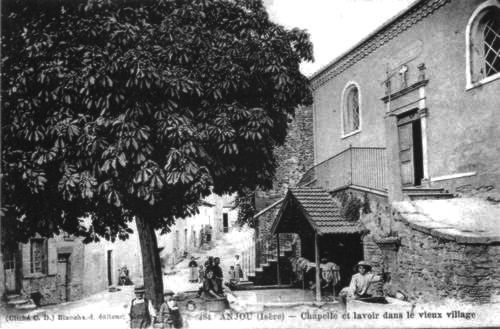
The Chapel of Notre-Dame

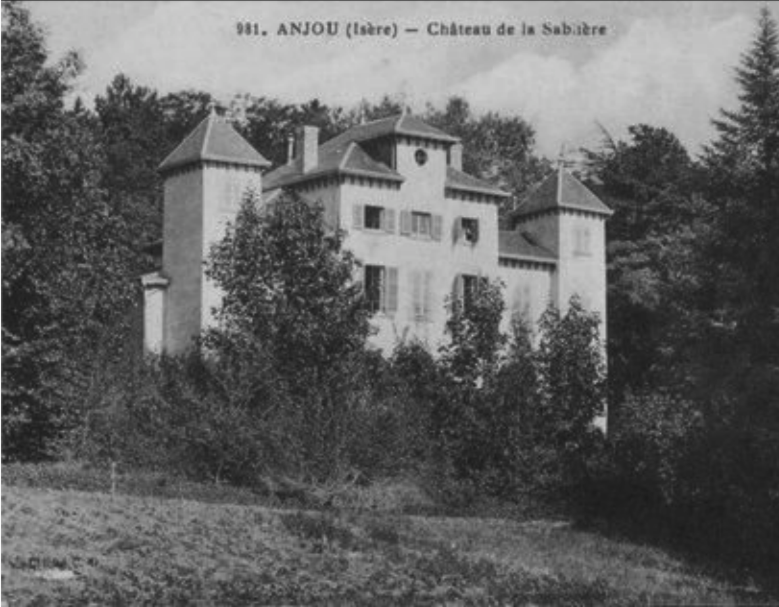
The Château de la Sablière

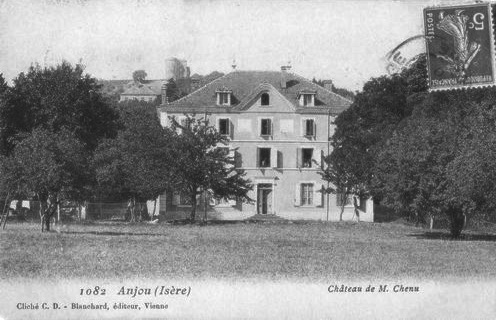
The Chateau of Mr. Chenu

- The Church was built in the 19th century and its bell tower was completed with two bells cast in Lyon in 1849 and in 1861. This tower has the oldest bell in the region. It originated from the Celestine convent in Lyon which was destroyed during the French Revolution and brought to Anjou by the Bectoz family of Vaubonnais who owned a chateau in the area. A collection of stained glass windows unique for the homogeneity of design and the outstanding quality of the colours is renowned in this building. The Church contains a Commemorative Plaque (1274) which is registered as an historical object. Open to the public.
- The Chateau of Anjou and its 10-hectare park (18th century) are registered as historical monuments. The remains of the castle and a park created by the famous landscape architects Henri and Achille Duchêne for Clément and Alice Jourdan are open to the public.
- The Fondru Chateau was built in the 19th century and belonged to the Bectoz family of Vaubonnais. It has an attractive dovecote which is undergoing restoration. Not open to the public.
- The Chateau de la Sablière. Not open to the public.
- The Feudal tower of Anjou was part of an old medieval castle from the 12th or 13th century. It overlooks the Old Village and the Chateau of Anjou. The tower is today a panoramic site that provides a unique perspective over several departments: Explanatory panels, an orientation table, picnic tables, and toilet facilities available to visitors. Open to the public.
- The Old Village of Anjou has many charming and picturesque lanes including a blacksmith's sign dating to 1666.
- A pedestrian promenade allows the leisurely exploration of the history and culture of Anjou in a day.

== Notable people linked to the commune ==
- Raimon of Anjou, a 12th-century Troubadour in the provençal language, one of the first lords of Anjou.
- Charles IX, King of France (1550-1574) dined at the Anjou Chateau on 15 August 1564.
- Claude Brosse, a famous community trustee of the Dauphine villages, was châtelain of Anjou. In 1639 Louis XIII granted a decree to him rendering fairer assizes (taxes) for the people, or Third-estate. His daughter married Joseph de Bectoz de Vaubonnais and brought him, through her dowry, the Anjou land.
- Melchior Mitte de Chevrières, Count of Anjou, hosted Louis de Bourbon, cousin of Louis XIII and the governor of Dauphiné at his Chateau in Anjou during Christmas celebrations in 1623.
- Louis XIII, King of France, lodged at Anjou Chateau with his entire court on 20 July 1629, during his return from the South.
- Humbert Guillot de Golat, Squire of Garenne, a Dauphinois poet, lived at Anjou where he wrote many poems.
- Sarah Bernhardt visited Anjou in 1887 and stayed at Anjou Chateau at the invitation of Clément and Alice Jourdan.

== See also ==
- Communes of the Isère department
