= Pommier-de-Beaurepaire =

- Commune
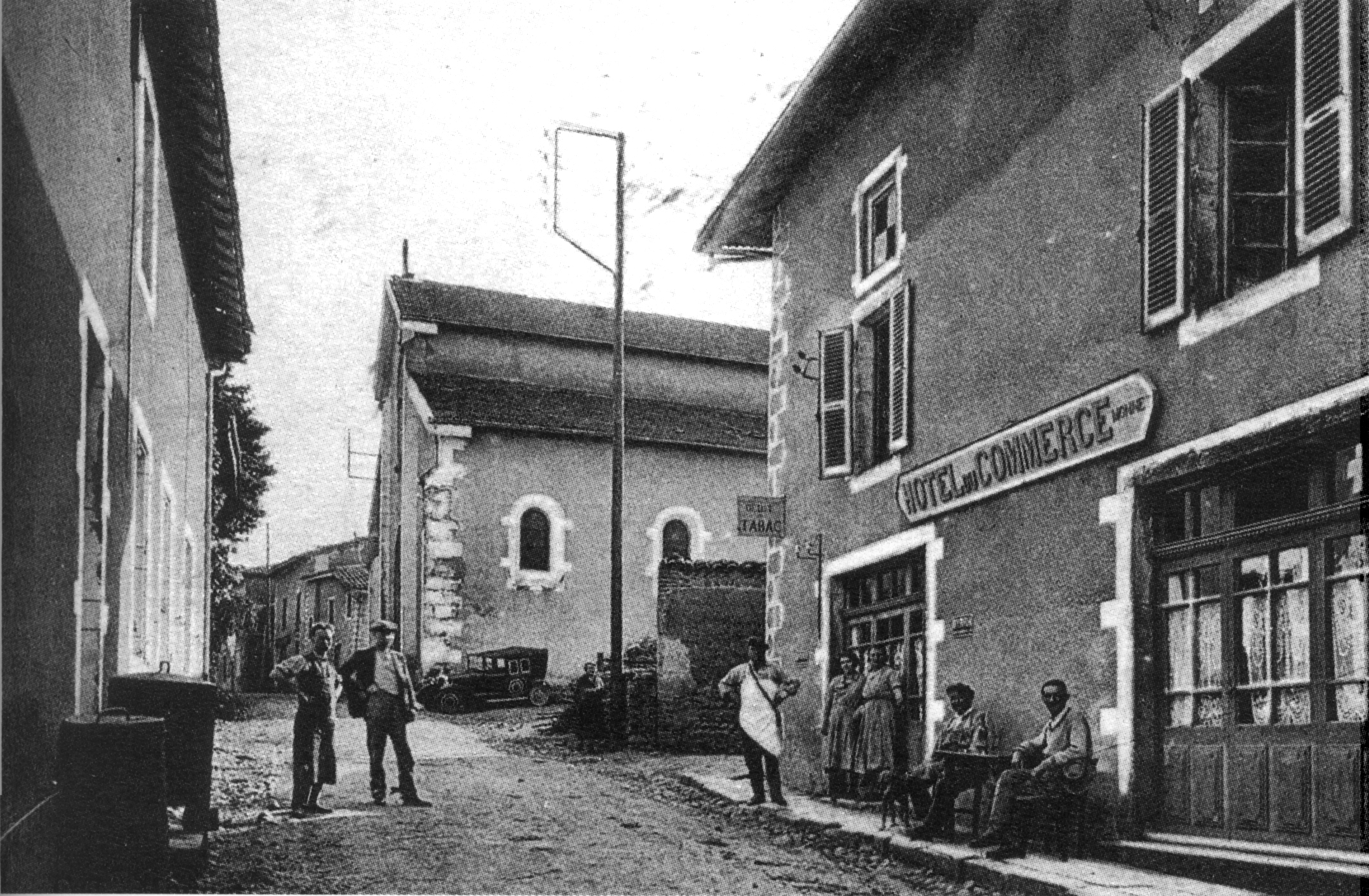
- Pommier-de-Beaurepaire around 1930
- Location of Pommier-de-Beaurepaire
- Location within France Location within Auvergne-Rhône-Alpes
- Coordinates: 45°24′03″N 5°07′14″E
- Country: France
- Region: Auvergne-Rhône-Alpes
- Department: Isère
- Arrondissement: Vienne
- Canton: Roussillon

Government
  - Mayor (2021–2026): Michel Pascal
- Area^{1}: 19.16 km^{2} (7.40 sq mi)
- Elevation: 468 m (1,535 ft)
- Highest elevation: 507 m (1,663 ft)
- Lowest elevation: 274 m (899 ft)
- Population (2023): 731
  - Density: 38.2/km^{2} (98.8/sq mi)
- Time zone: UTC+01:00 (CET)
  - Summer (DST): UTC+02:00 (CEST)
- INSEE/Postal code: 38311 /38260
- ^{1} French Land Register data, which excludes lakes, ponds, glaciers > 1 km^{2} (0.386 sq mi or 247 acres) and river estuaries.

Pommier-de-Beaurepaire (French pronunciation: [pɔmje də boʁpɛʁ], literally Pommier of Beaurepaire) is a commune in the Isère department in southeastern France.

== Population ==
Historical population
| Year | Pop. | ±% p.a. |
|---|---|---|
| 1968 | 496 | — |
| 1975 | 475 | −0.62% |
| 1982 | 530 | +1.58% |
| 1990 | 571 | +0.94% |
| 1999 | 583 | +0.23% |
| 2007 | 672 | +1.79% |
| 2012 | 708 | +1.05% |
| 2017 | 704 | −0.11% |
| 2023 | 731 | +0.63% |
Source: INSEE

== See also ==
- Communes of the Isère department
