= Jarcieu =

- Commune
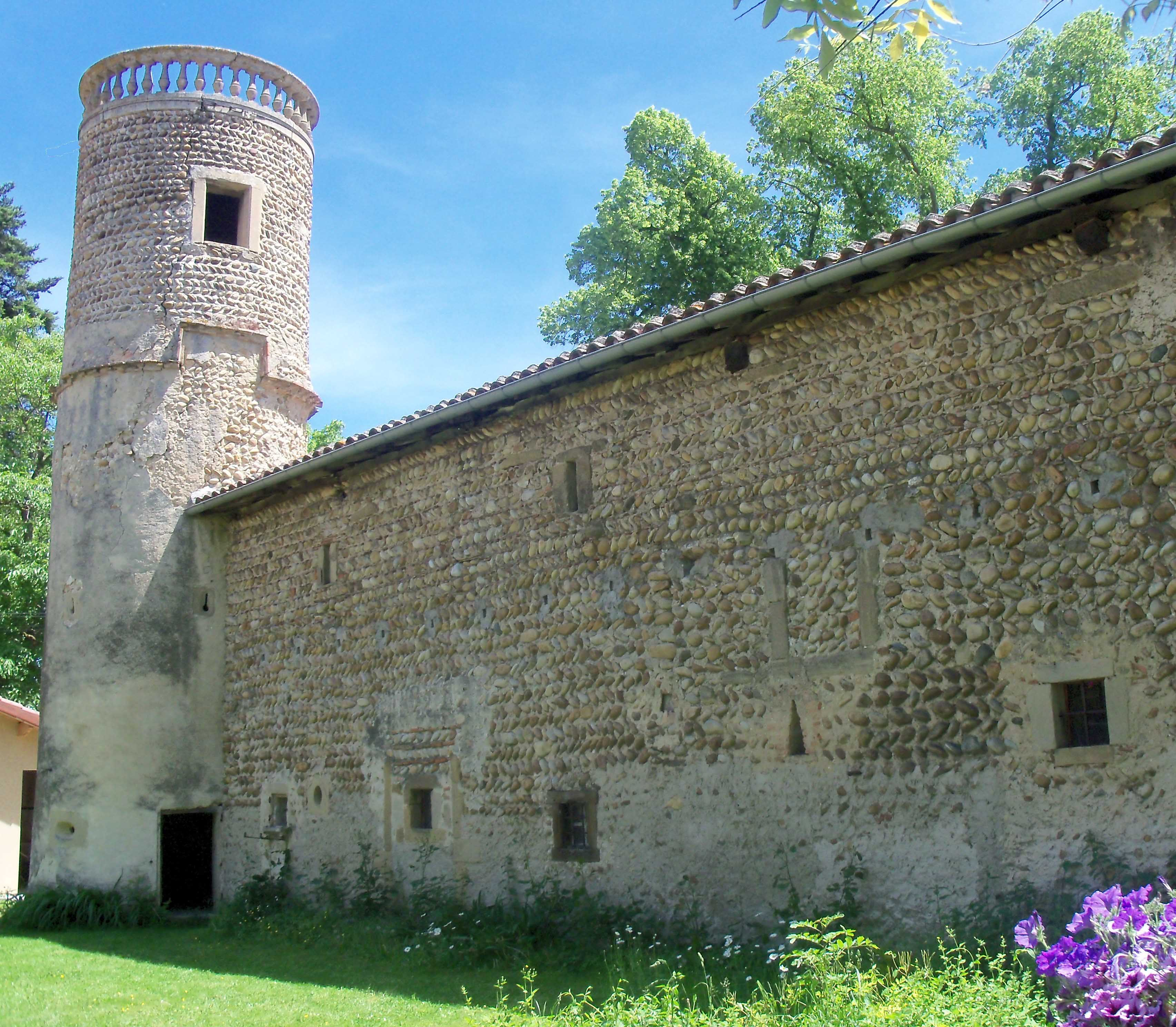
- The château of Jarcieu
- Location of Jarcieu
- Location within France Location within Auvergne-Rhône-Alpes
- Coordinates: 45°20′05″N 4°56′50″E
- Country: France
- Region: Auvergne-Rhône-Alpes
- Department: Isère
- Arrondissement: Vienne
- Canton: Roussillon
- Intercommunality: Entre Bièvre et Rhône

Government
  - Mayor (2020–2026): Yann Berhault
- Area^{1}: 6.31 km^{2} (2.44 sq mi)
- Highest elevation: 248 m (814 ft)
- Lowest elevation: 205 m (673 ft)
- Population (2023): 1,135
  - Density: 180/km^{2} (466/sq mi)
- Time zone: UTC+01:00 (CET)
  - Summer (DST): UTC+02:00 (CEST)
- INSEE/Postal code: 38198 /38270
- ^{1} French Land Register data, which excludes lakes, ponds, glaciers > 1 km^{2} (0.386 sq mi or 247 acres) and river estuaries.

Jarcieu (French pronunciation: [ʒaʁsjø]) is a commune in the Isère department in southeastern France.

== Population ==
Historical population
| Year | Pop. | ±% p.a. |
|---|---|---|
| 1968 | 590 | — |
| 1975 | 588 | −0.05% |
| 1982 | 623 | +0.83% |
| 1990 | 698 | +1.43% |
| 1999 | 780 | +1.24% |
| 2007 | 951 | +2.51% |
| 2012 | 1,038 | +1.77% |
| 2017 | 1,037 | −0.02% |
| 2023 | 1,135 | +1.52% |
Source: INSEE

== See also ==
- Communes of the Isère department
