= Monsteroux-Milieu =

- Commune
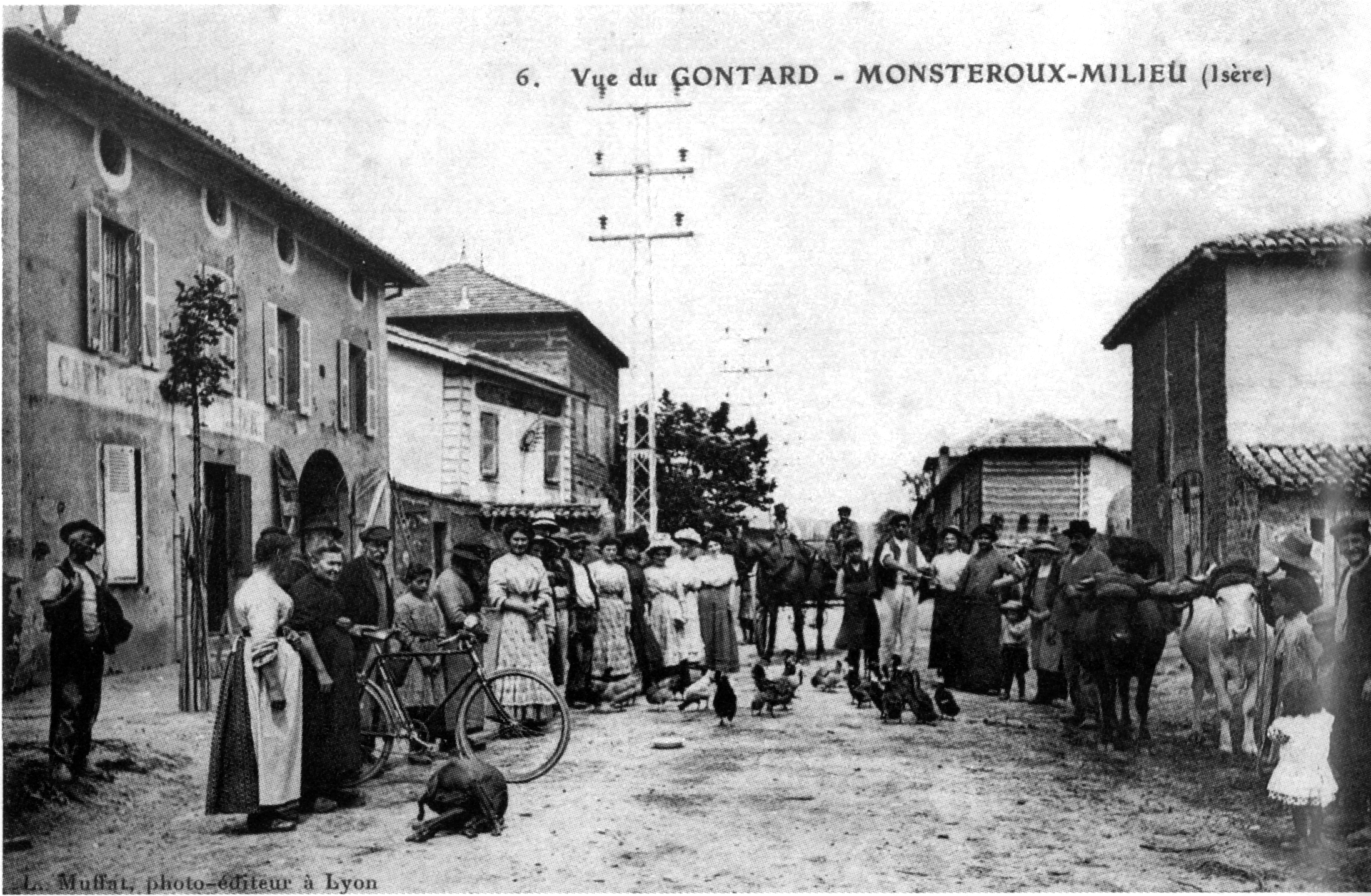
- Monsteroux-Milieu in 1910
- Location of Monsteroux-Milieu
- Location within France Location within Auvergne-Rhône-Alpes
- Coordinates: 45°25′58″N 4°56′15″E
- Country: France
- Region: Auvergne-Rhône-Alpes
- Department: Isère
- Arrondissement: Vienne
- Canton: Roussillon

Government
  - Mayor (2025–2026): Thierry Maucherat
- Area^{1}: 8.17 km^{2} (3.15 sq mi)
- Elevation: 318 m (1,043 ft)
- Highest elevation: 425 m (1,394 ft)
- Lowest elevation: 267 m (876 ft)
- Population (2023): 768
  - Density: 94.0/km^{2} (243/sq mi)
- Time zone: UTC+01:00 (CET)
  - Summer (DST): UTC+02:00 (CEST)
- INSEE/Postal code: 38244 /38122
- ^{1} French Land Register data, which excludes lakes, ponds, glaciers > 1 km^{2} (0.386 sq mi or 247 acres) and river estuaries.

Monsteroux-Milieu (French pronunciation: [mɔ̃stəʁu miljø]) is a commune in the Isère department in southeastern France.

== Population ==
Historical population
Year	Pop.	±% p.a.
1968	228	—
1975	226	−0.13%
1982	318	+5.00%
1990	444	+4.26%
1999	516	+1.68%
2007	709	+4.05%
2012	766	+1.56%
2017	792	+0.67%
2023	768	−0.51%
Source: INSEE

== See also ==
- Communes of the Isère department
