= Montseveroux =

- Commune
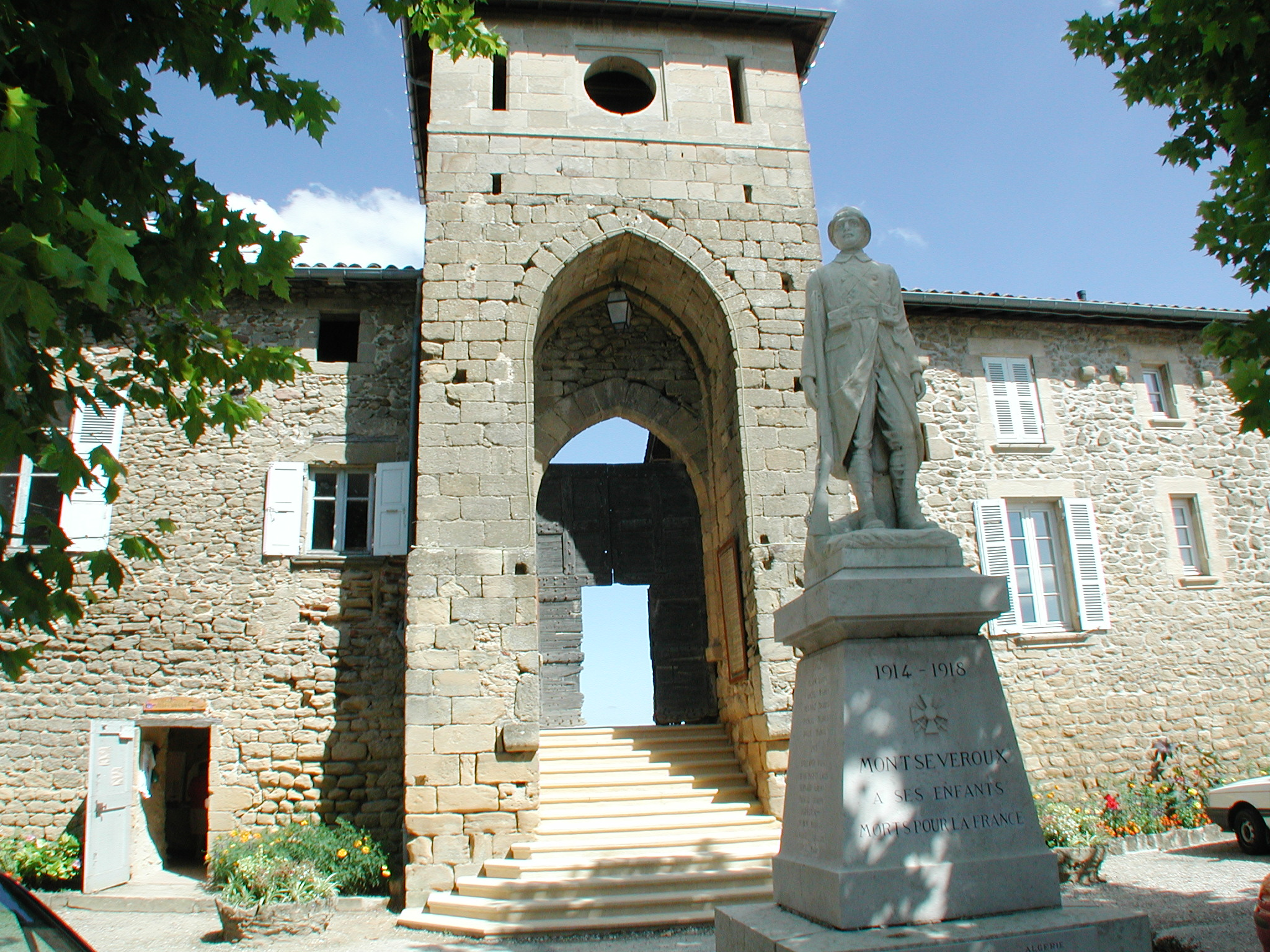
- Entrance to the chateau
- Location of Montseveroux
- Location within France Location within Auvergne-Rhône-Alpes
- Coordinates: 45°25′48″N 4°58′18″E
- Country: France
- Region: Auvergne-Rhône-Alpes
- Department: Isère
- Arrondissement: Vienne
- Canton: Roussillon
- Intercommunality: Entre Bièvre et Rhône

Government
  - Mayor (2020–2026): Karelle Ogier
- Area^{1}: 16.48 km^{2} (6.36 sq mi)
- Elevation: 400 m (1,300 ft)
- Highest elevation: 452 m (1,483 ft)
- Lowest elevation: 289 m (948 ft)
- Population (2023): 999
  - Density: 60.6/km^{2} (157/sq mi)
- Time zone: UTC+01:00 (CET)
  - Summer (DST): UTC+02:00 (CEST)
- INSEE/Postal code: 38259 /38122
- ^{1} French Land Register data, which excludes lakes, ponds, glaciers > 1 km^{2} (0.386 sq mi or 247 acres) and river estuaries.

Montseveroux (French pronunciation: [mɔ̃səv(ə)ʁu]) is a commune in the Isère department in southeastern France.

== Population ==
Historical population
Year	Pop.	±% p.a.
1968	398	—
1975	418	+0.70%
1982	522	+3.22%
1990	637	+2.52%
1999	782	+2.30%
2007	855	+1.12%
2012	918	+1.43%
2017	961	+0.92%
2023	999	+0.65%
Source: INSEE

== See also ==
- Communes of the Isère department
