= Saint-Barthélemy, Isère =

Saint-Barthélemy
- Commune
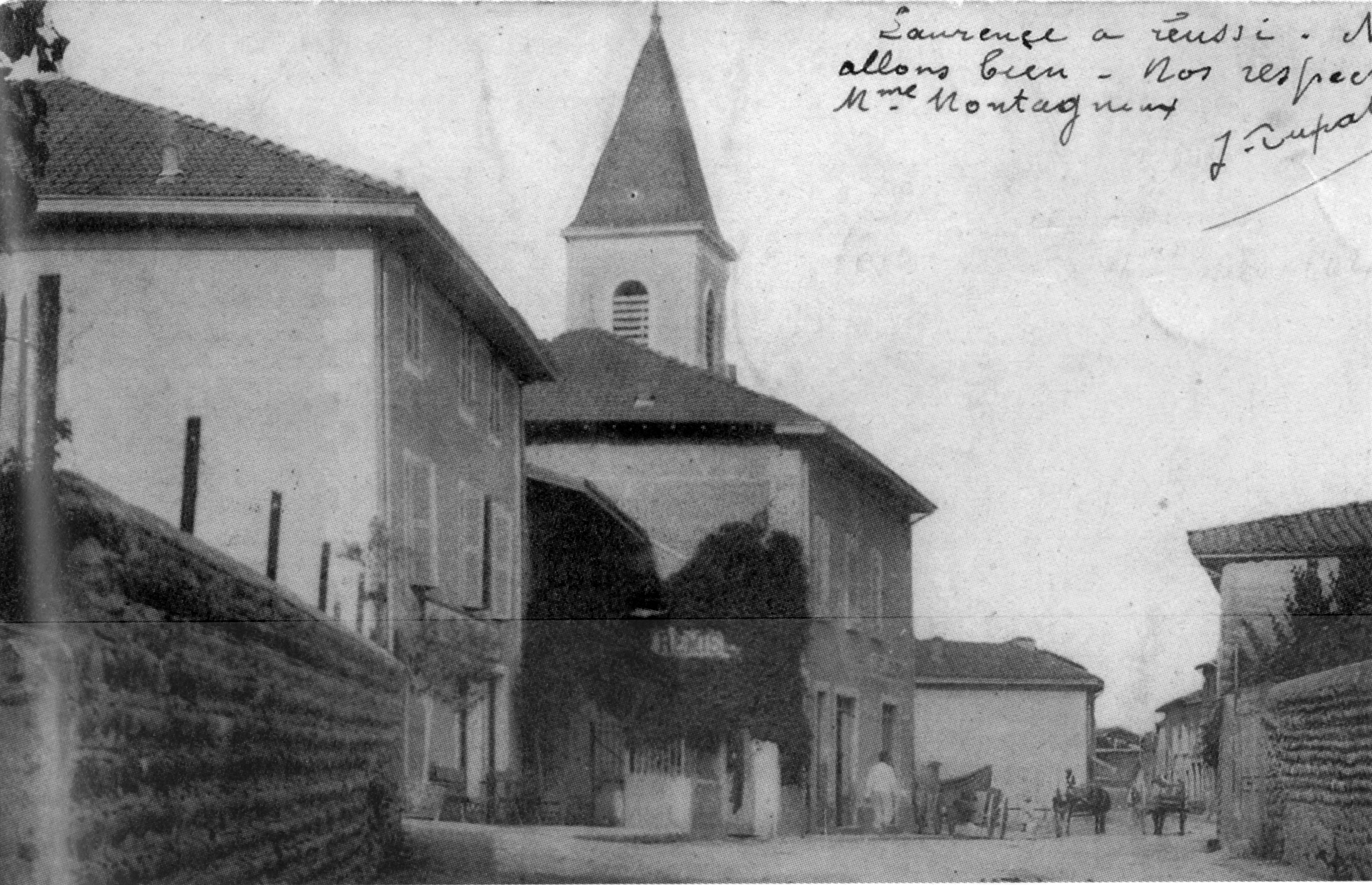
- Saint-Barthélemy in 1906
- Location of Saint-Barthélemy
- Location within France Location within Auvergne-Rhône-Alpes
- Coordinates: 45°20′50″N 5°04′51″E
- Country: France
- Region: Auvergne-Rhône-Alpes
- Department: Isère
- Arrondissement: Vienne
- Canton: Roussillon

Government
  - Mayor (2020–2026): Gérard Bect
- Area^{1}: 7.98 km^{2} (3.08 sq mi)
- Highest elevation: 326 m (1,070 ft)
- Lowest elevation: 258 m (846 ft)
- Population (2023): 923
  - Density: 116/km^{2} (300/sq mi)
- Time zone: UTC+01:00 (CET)
  - Summer (DST): UTC+02:00 (CEST)
- INSEE/Postal code: 38363 /38270
- ^{1} French Land Register data, which excludes lakes, ponds, glaciers > 1 km^{2} (0.386 sq mi or 247 acres) and river estuaries.

Saint-Barthélemy (French pronunciation: [sɛ̃ baʁtelemi]) is a commune in the Isère department in southeastern France.

== Population ==
Historical population
Year	Pop.	±% p.a.
1968	577	—
1975	605	+0.68%
1982	620	+0.35%
1990	674	+1.05%
1999	765	+1.42%
2007	932	+2.50%
2012	981	+1.03%
2017	941	−0.83%
2023	923	−0.32%
Source: INSEE

== See also ==
- Communes of the Isère department
