= Saint-Julien-de-l'Herms =

- Commune
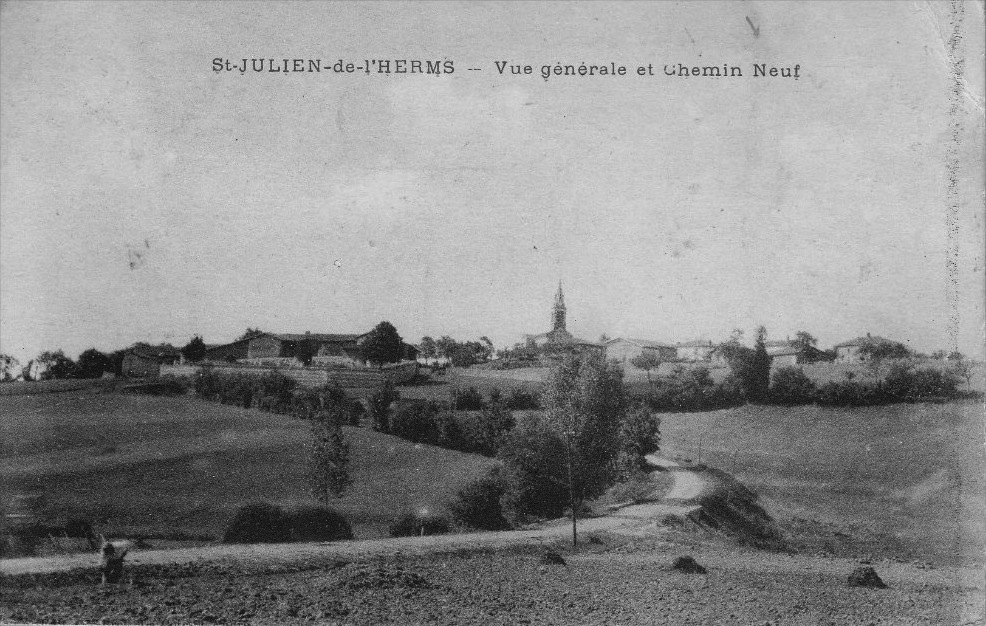
- Saint-Julien-de-l'Herms in the early 20th century
- Location of Saint-Julien-de-l'Herms
- Location within France Location within Auvergne-Rhône-Alpes
- Coordinates: 45°26′00″N 5°05′42″E
- Country: France
- Region: Auvergne-Rhône-Alpes
- Department: Isère
- Arrondissement: Vienne
- Canton: Roussillon

Government
  - Mayor (2020–2026): Axel Monteyremard
- Area^{1}: 9.17 km^{2} (3.54 sq mi)
- Elevation: 450 m (1,480 ft)
- Highest elevation: 507 m (1,663 ft)
- Lowest elevation: 374 m (1,227 ft)
- Population (2023): 165
  - Density: 18.0/km^{2} (46.6/sq mi)
- Time zone: UTC+01:00 (CET)
  - Summer (DST): UTC+02:00 (CEST)
- INSEE/Postal code: 38406 /38122
- ^{1} French Land Register data, which excludes lakes, ponds, glaciers > 1 km^{2} (0.386 sq mi or 247 acres) and river estuaries.

Saint-Julien-de-l'Herms (French pronunciation: [sɛ̃ ʒyljɛ̃ də lɛʁm]) is a commune in the Isère department in southeastern France.

== Population ==
Historical population
Year	Pop.	±% p.a.
1968	117	—
1975	108	−1.14%
1982	98	−1.38%
1990	103	+0.62%
1999	111	+0.83%
2007	146	+3.49%
2012	140	−0.84%
2017	149	+1.25%
2023	165	+1.71%
Source: INSEE

== See also ==
- Communes of the Isère department
