= Primarette =

- Commune
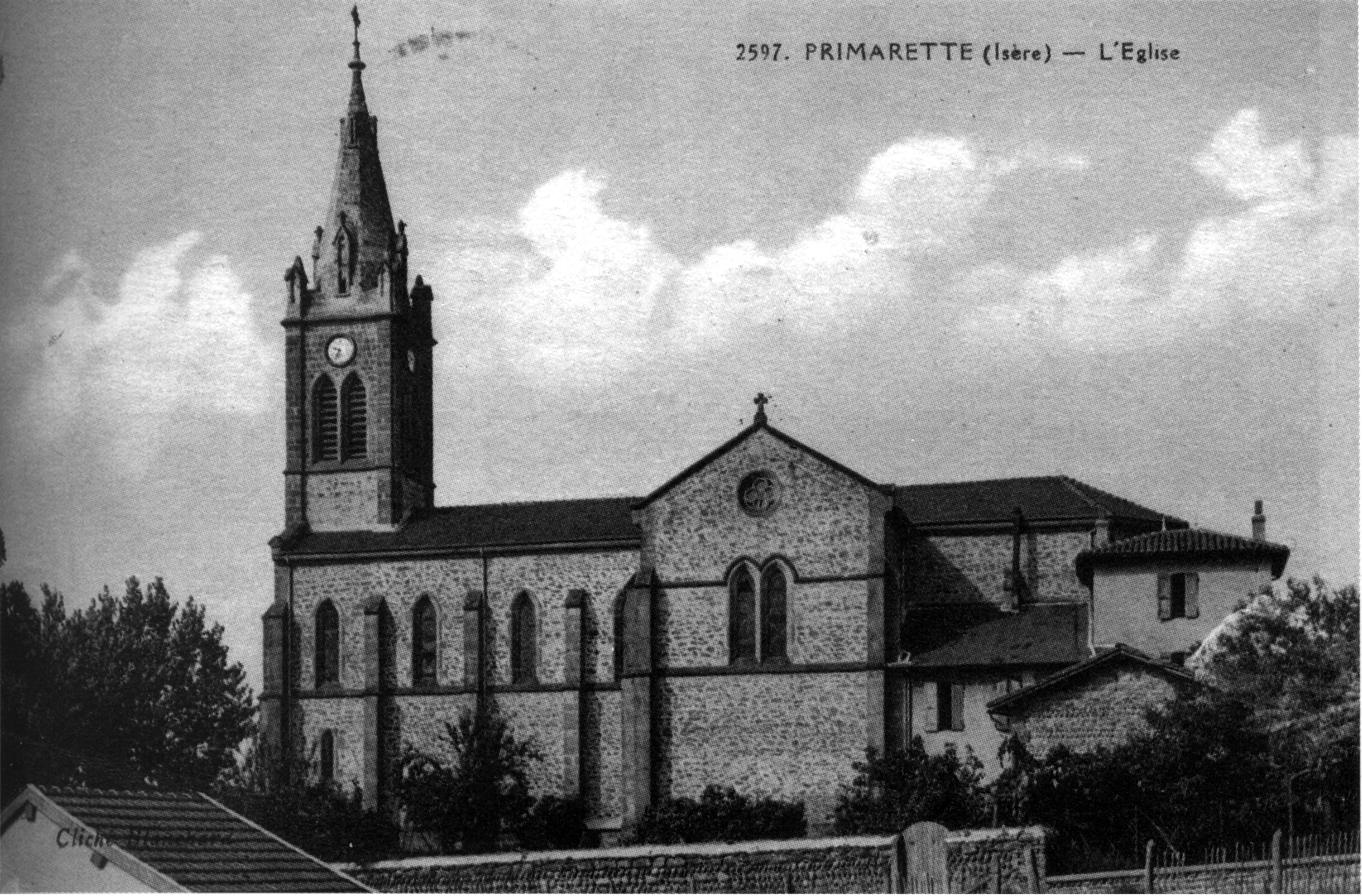
- The church of Primarette, in 1911
- Location of Primarette
- Location within France Location within Auvergne-Rhône-Alpes
- Coordinates: 45°24′10″N 5°01′52″E
- Country: France
- Region: Auvergne-Rhône-Alpes
- Department: Isère
- Arrondissement: Vienne
- Canton: Roussillon

Government
  - Mayor (2020–2026): Serge Mercier
- Area^{1}: 21.76 km^{2} (8.40 sq mi)
- Elevation: 415 m (1,362 ft)
- Highest elevation: 485 m (1,591 ft)
- Lowest elevation: 300 m (980 ft)
- Population (2023): 686
  - Density: 31.5/km^{2} (81.7/sq mi)
- Time zone: UTC+01:00 (CET)
  - Summer (DST): UTC+02:00 (CEST)
- INSEE/Postal code: 38324 /38270
- ^{1} French Land Register data, which excludes lakes, ponds, glaciers > 1 km^{2} (0.386 sq mi or 247 acres) and river estuaries.

Primarette (French pronunciation: [pʁimaʁɛt]) is a commune in the Isère department in southeastern France.

== Population ==
Historical population
Year	Pop.	±% p.a.
1968	365	—
1975	364	−0.04%
1982	428	+2.34%
1990	595	+4.20%
1999	620	+0.46%
2007	697	+1.47%
2012	735	+1.07%
2017	720	−0.41%
2023	686	−0.80%
Source: INSEE

== See also ==
- Communes of the Isère department
