= Canton of Roussillon =

Administrative division of the Isère department, France

Coordinates: 45.37°N 4.81°E

The canton of Roussillon is an administrative division of the Isère department, eastern France. Its borders were modified at the French canton reorganisation which came into effect in March 2015. Its seat is in Roussillon.

It consists of the following communes:

1. Agnin
2. Anjou
3. Beaurepaire
4. Bellegarde-Poussieu
5. Bougé-Chambalud
6. Chalon
7. Chanas
8. La Chapelle-de-Surieu
9. Cour-et-Buis
10. Jarcieu
11. Moissieu-sur-Dolon
12. Monsteroux-Milieu
13. Montseveroux
14. Pact
15. Le Péage-de-Roussillon
16. Pisieu
17. Pommier-de-Beaurepaire
18. Primarette
19. Revel-Tourdan
20. Roussillon
21. Sablons
22. Saint-Barthélemy
23. Saint-Julien-de-l'Herms
24. Saint-Romain-de-Surieu
25. Salaise-sur-Sanne
26. Sonnay
27. Ville-sous-Anjou
