= Bellegarde-Poussieu =

- Commune
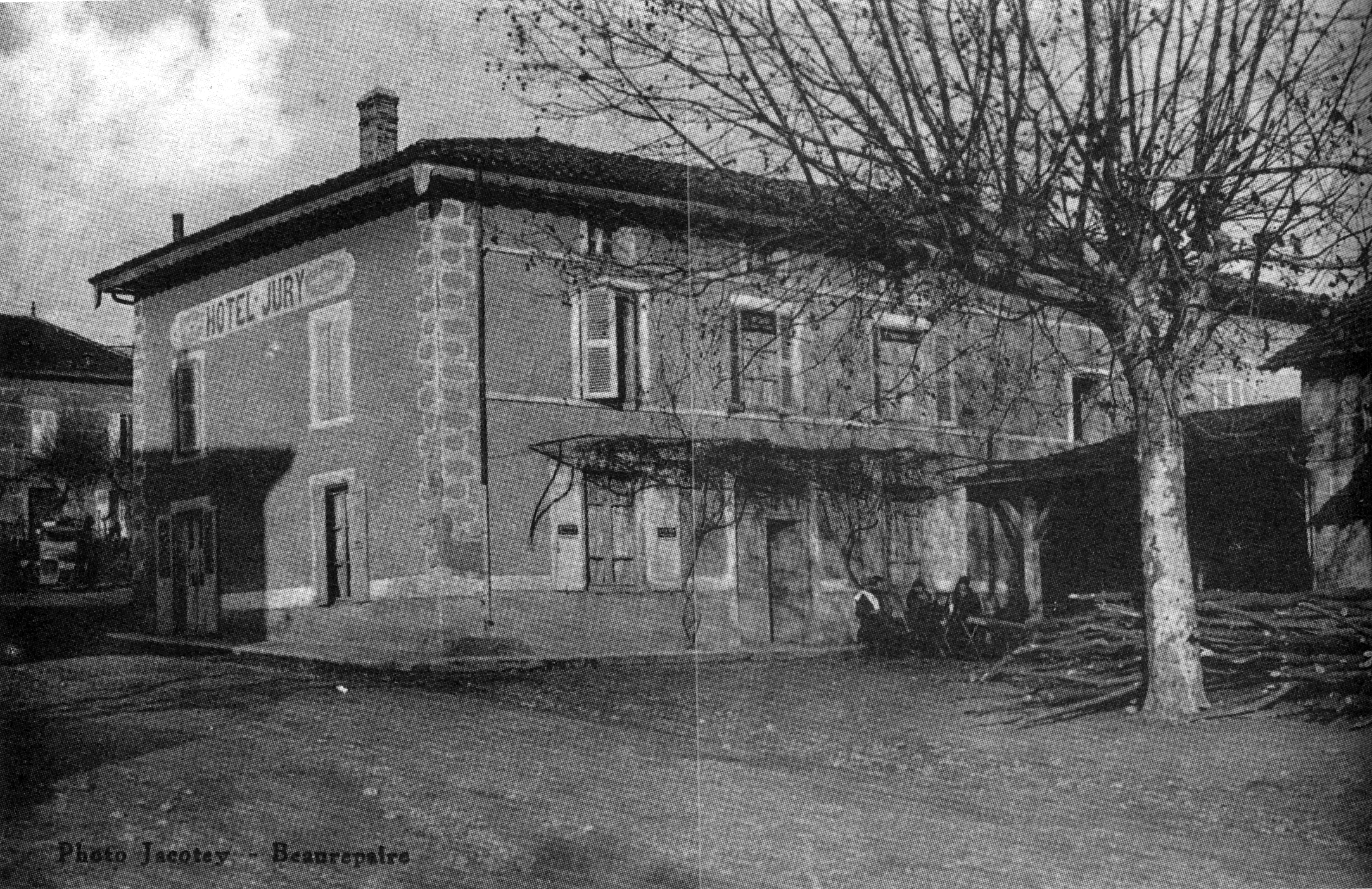
- Bellegarde-Poussieu in 1930

- Coat of arms
- Location of Bellegarde-Poussieu
- Location within France Location within Auvergne-Rhône-Alpes
- Coordinates: 45°22′50″N 4°57′40″E
- Country: France
- Region: Auvergne-Rhône-Alpes
- Department: Isère
- Arrondissement: Vienne
- Canton: Roussillon

Government
  - Mayor (2020–2026): Christelle Grangeot
- Area^{1}: 16.79 km^{2} (6.48 sq mi)
- Elevation: 300 m (980 ft)
- Highest elevation: 436 m (1,430 ft)
- Lowest elevation: 229 m (751 ft)
- Population (2023): 1,007
  - Density: 59.98/km^{2} (155.3/sq mi)
- Time zone: UTC+01:00 (CET)
  - Summer (DST): UTC+02:00 (CEST)
- INSEE/Postal code: 38037 /38270
- ^{1} French Land Register data, which excludes lakes, ponds, glaciers > 1 km^{2} (0.386 sq mi or 247 acres) and river estuaries.

Bellegarde-Poussieu (French pronunciation: [bɛlɡaʁd pusjø]) is a commune in the Isère department in southeastern France.

== Population ==
Historical population
Year	Pop.	±% p.a.
1968	567	—
1975	560	−0.18%
1982	616	+1.37%
1990	699	+1.59%
1999	851	+2.21%
2007	912	+0.87%
2012	949	+0.80%
2017	990	+0.85%
2023	1,007	+0.28%
Source: INSEE

== See also ==
- Communes of the Isère department
