= Pact, Isère =

Pact
- Commune
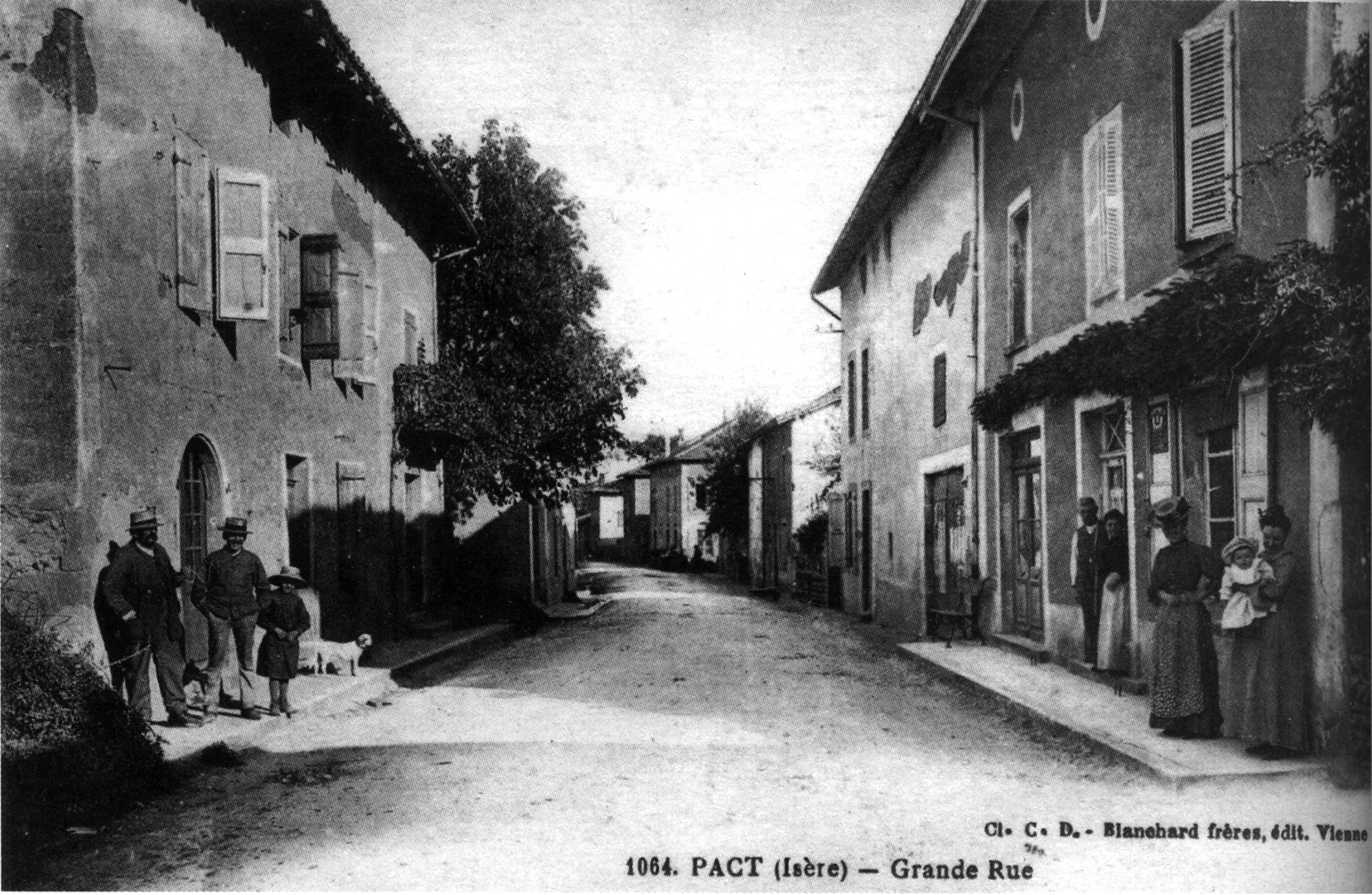
- The main road in 1908
- Location of Pact
- Location within France Location within Auvergne-Rhône-Alpes
- Coordinates: 45°21′13″N 4°59′32″E
- Country: France
- Region: Auvergne-Rhône-Alpes
- Department: Isère
- Arrondissement: Vienne
- Canton: Roussillon
- Intercommunality: Entre Bièvre et Rhône

Government
  - Mayor (2020–2026): Laurent Iltis
- Area^{1}: 9.74 km^{2} (3.76 sq mi)
- Highest elevation: 309 m (1,014 ft)
- Lowest elevation: 238 m (781 ft)
- Population (2023): 863
  - Density: 88.6/km^{2} (229/sq mi)
- Time zone: UTC+01:00 (CET)
  - Summer (DST): UTC+02:00 (CEST)
- INSEE/Postal code: 38290 /38270
- ^{1} French Land Register data, which excludes lakes, ponds, glaciers > 1 km^{2} (0.386 sq mi or 247 acres) and river estuaries.

Pact (French pronunciation: [pakt]) is a commune in the Isère department in southeastern France.

== Population ==
Historical population
Year	Pop.	±% p.a.
1968	462	—
1975	471	+0.28%
1982	480	+0.27%
1990	560	+1.95%
1999	642	+1.53%
2007	776	+2.40%
2012	845	+1.72%
2017	841	−0.09%
2023	863	+0.43%
Source: INSEE

== See also ==
- Communes of the Isère department
