= Saint-Romain-de-Surieu =

- Commune
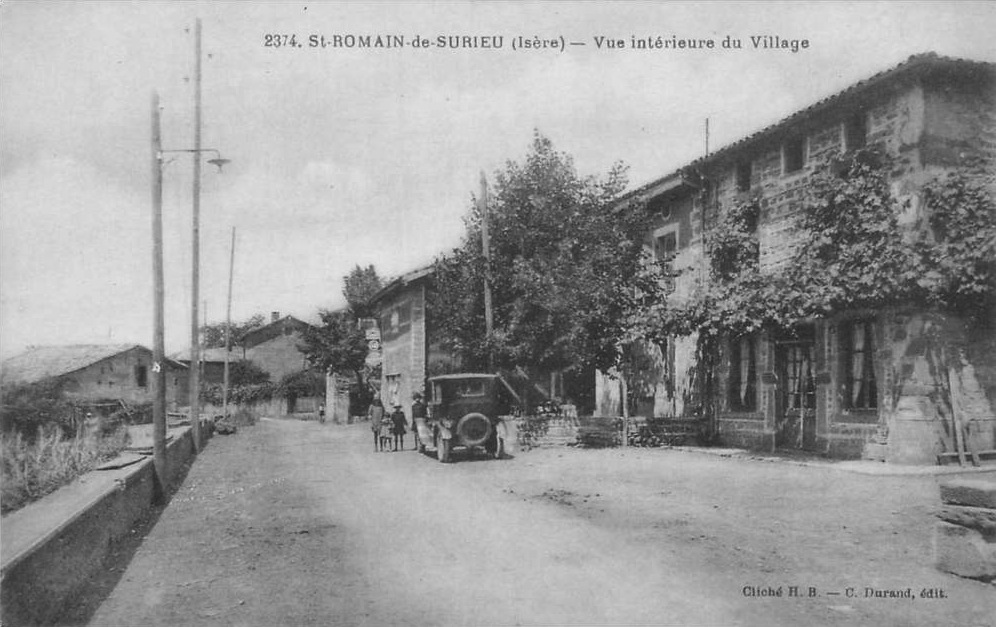
- Saint-Romain-de-Surieu in the early 20th century
- Location of Saint-Romain-de-Surieu
- Location within France Location within Auvergne-Rhône-Alpes
- Coordinates: 45°23′14″N 4°53′02″E
- Country: France
- Region: Auvergne-Rhône-Alpes
- Department: Isère
- Arrondissement: Vienne
- Canton: Roussillon

Government
  - Mayor (2020–2026): Robert Mouchiroud
- Area^{1}: 4.71 km^{2} (1.82 sq mi)
- Highest elevation: 402 m (1,319 ft)
- Lowest elevation: 240 m (790 ft)
- Population (2023): 468
  - Density: 99.4/km^{2} (257/sq mi)
- Time zone: UTC+01:00 (CET)
  - Summer (DST): UTC+02:00 (CEST)
- INSEE/Postal code: 38452 /38150
- ^{1} French Land Register data, which excludes lakes, ponds, glaciers > 1 km^{2} (0.386 sq mi or 247 acres) and river estuaries.

Saint-Romain-de-Surieu (French pronunciation: [sɛ̃ ʁɔmɛ̃ də syʁjø]) is a commune in the Isère department in southeastern France.

== Population ==
Historical population
Year	Pop.	±% p.a.
1968	206	—
1975	198	−0.56%
1982	213	+1.05%
1990	249	+1.97%
1999	246	−0.13%
2007	296	+2.34%
2012	336	+2.57%
2017	353	+0.99%
2023	468	+4.81%
Source: INSEE

== See also ==
- Communes of the Isère department
