= Pisieu =

- Commune
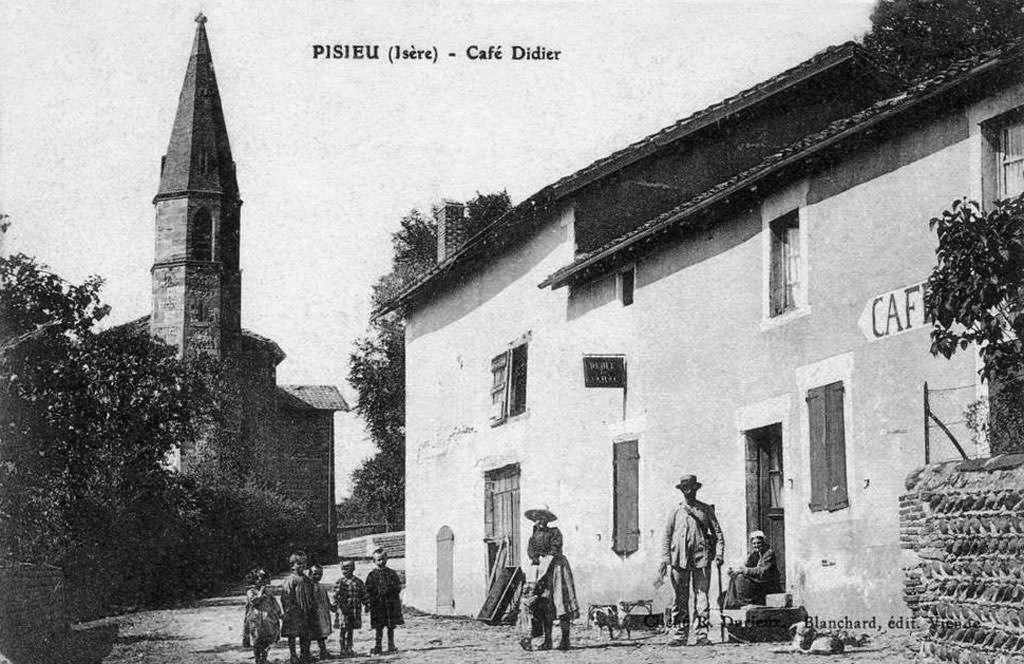
- Pisieu in the early 20th century
- Location of Pisieu
- Location within France Location within Auvergne-Rhône-Alpes
- Coordinates: 45°23′16″N 5°03′40″E
- Country: France
- Region: Auvergne-Rhône-Alpes
- Department: Isère
- Arrondissement: Vienne
- Canton: Roussillon

Government
  - Mayor (2020–2026): Jean-Luc Durieux
- Area^{1}: 18.76 km^{2} (7.24 sq mi)
- Elevation: 430 m (1,410 ft)
- Highest elevation: 490 m (1,610 ft)
- Lowest elevation: 291 m (955 ft)
- Population (2023): 524
  - Density: 27.9/km^{2} (72.3/sq mi)
- Time zone: UTC+01:00 (CET)
  - Summer (DST): UTC+02:00 (CEST)
- INSEE/Postal code: 38307 /38270
- ^{1} French Land Register data, which excludes lakes, ponds, glaciers > 1 km^{2} (0.386 sq mi or 247 acres) and river estuaries.

Pisieu (French pronunciation: [pizjø]) is a commune in the Isère department in southeastern France.

== Population ==
Historical population
Year	Pop.	±% p.a.
1968	361	—
1975	327	−1.40%
1982	315	−0.53%
1990	362	+1.75%
1999	469	+2.92%
2007	522	+1.35%
2012	537	+0.57%
2017	531	−0.22%
2023	524	−0.22%
Source: INSEE

== Twin towns ==
Pisieu is twinned with:

- Sant Martí de Tous, Spain, since 1996

== See also ==
- Communes of the Isère department
