= La Chapelle-de-Surieu =

- Commune
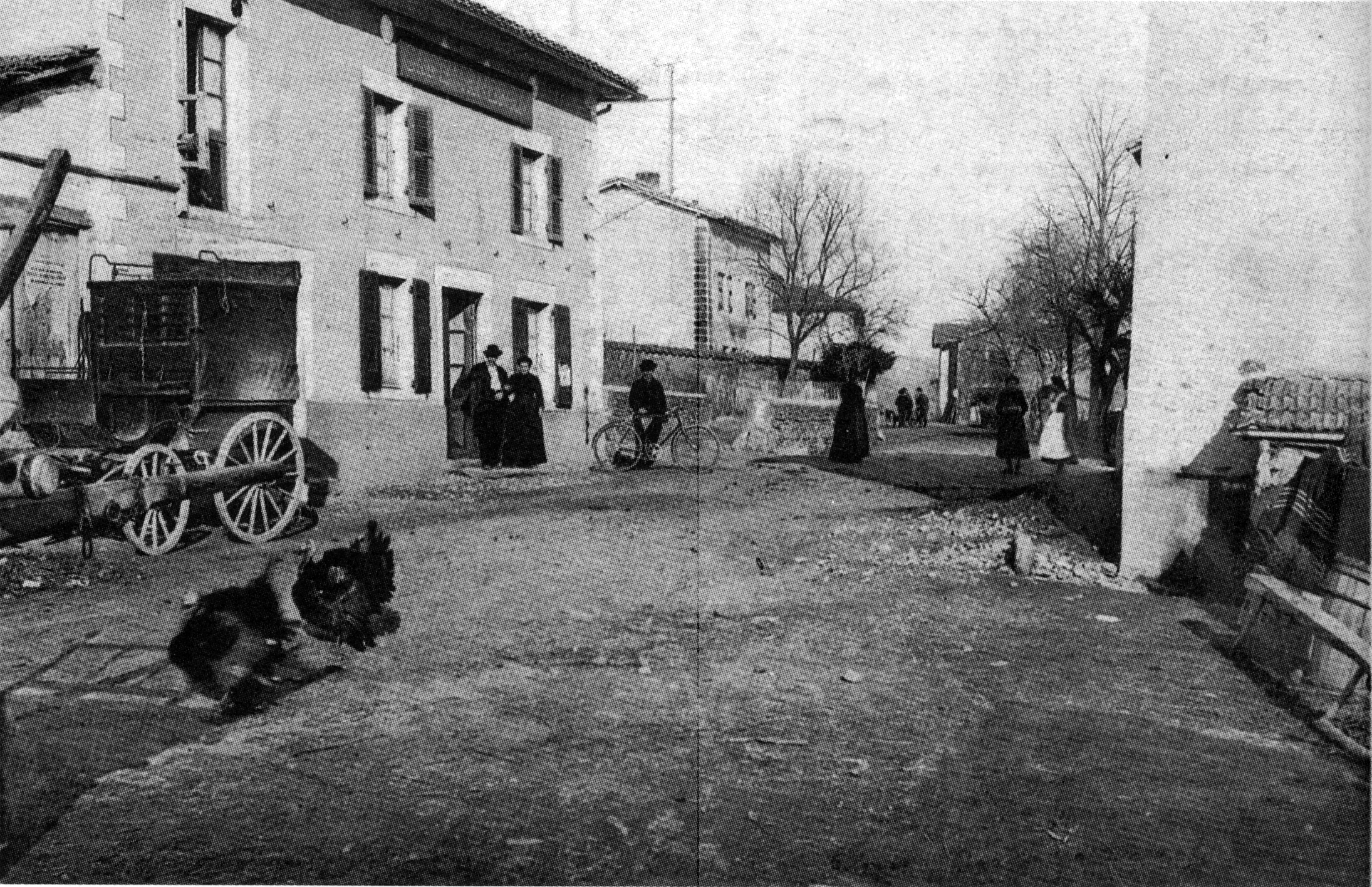
- A view of La Chapelle de Surieu, in 1909
- Location of La Chapelle-de-Surieu
- Location within France Location within Auvergne-Rhône-Alpes
- Coordinates: 45°23′31″N 4°54′38″E
- Country: France
- Region: Auvergne-Rhône-Alpes
- Department: Isère
- Arrondissement: Vienne
- Canton: Roussillon

Government
  - Mayor (2020–2026): Gabriel Girard
- Area^{1}: 11.22 km^{2} (4.33 sq mi)
- Highest elevation: 407 m (1,335 ft)
- Lowest elevation: 252 m (827 ft)
- Population (2023): 757
  - Density: 67.5/km^{2} (175/sq mi)
- Time zone: UTC+01:00 (CET)
  - Summer (DST): UTC+02:00 (CEST)
- INSEE/Postal code: 38077 /38150
- ^{1} French Land Register data, which excludes lakes, ponds, glaciers > 1 km^{2} (0.386 sq mi or 247 acres) and river estuaries.

La Chapelle-de-Surieu (French pronunciation: [la ʃapɛl də syʁjø]) is a commune in the Isère department in southeastern France.

== Population ==
Historical population
| Year | Pop. | ±% p.a. |
|---|---|---|
| 1968 | 345 | — |
| 1975 | 289 | −2.50% |
| 1982 | 326 | +1.74% |
| 1990 | 409 | +2.88% |
| 1999 | 477 | +1.72% |
| 2007 | 632 | +3.58% |
| 2012 | 712 | +2.41% |
| 2017 | 751 | +1.07% |
| 2023 | 757 | +0.13% |
Source: INSEE

== See also ==
- Communes of the Isère department
