= Jeanne Bouvier =

French feminist and trade unionist (1865–1964)

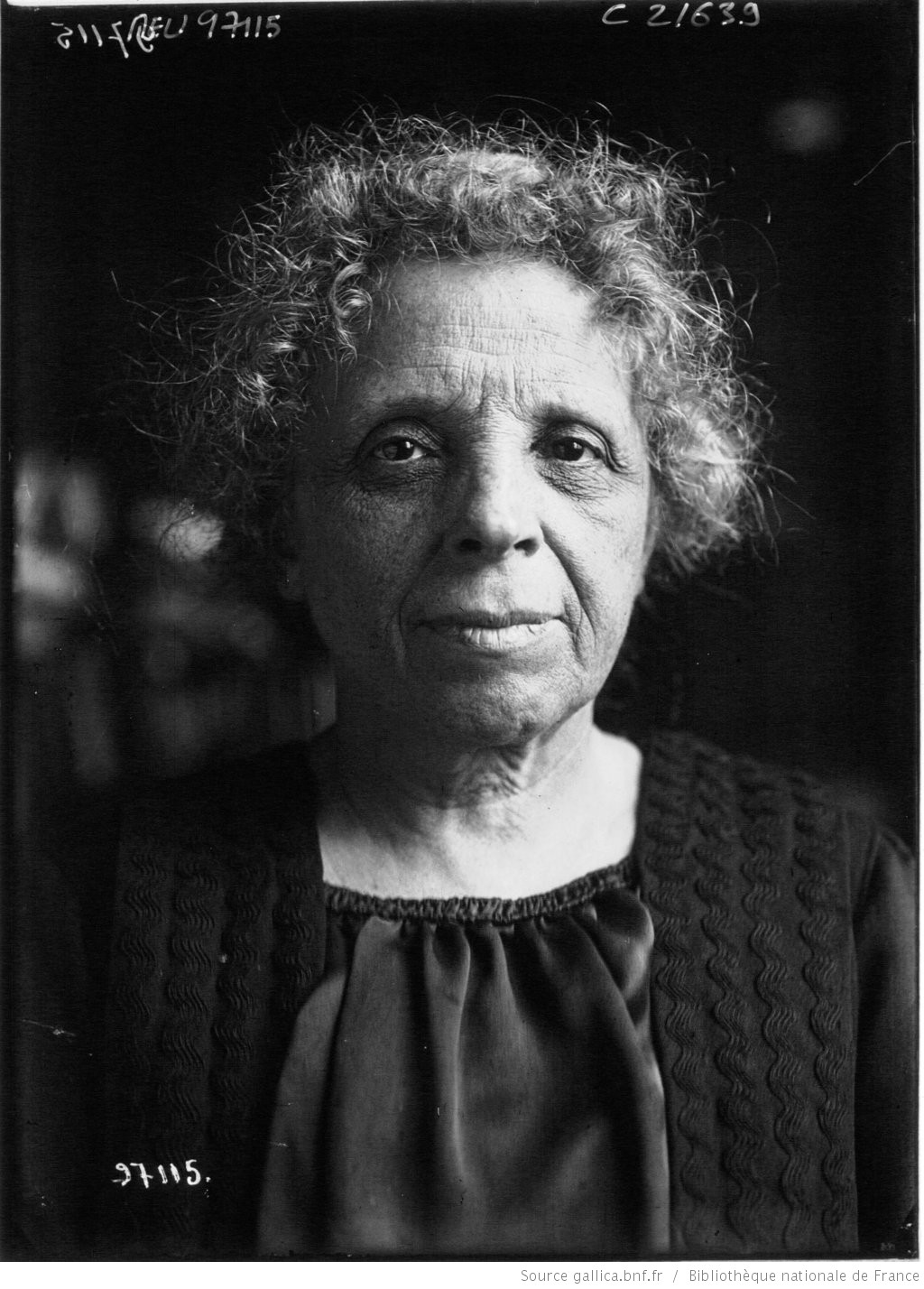
Jeanne Bouvier (1922)

Jeanne Bouvier (11 February 1865 – 1964) is remembered as a French textile worker, feminist, and militant trade unionist.

== Early life and education ==
Born in 1865 in Salaise-sur-Sanne, Isère, she was the daughter of Marcel Bouvier and Louise Grenouiller. The family moved to Saint-Rambert-d'Albon, Drôme, when Bouvier was 16 months old. She had a sister and there was a brother who died of measles. As a child, Bouvier helped her mother work in the fields and guard the cows. At the age of ten years, Bouvier was sent to board at a religious school in Épinouze where she was a good student.

== Career ==
When she was eleven, the family moved again and settled in Saint-Symphorien-d'Ozon, Rhône, and she became a silk factory worker.

After 1840 it was illegal for French children under the age of 12 to work more than an eight-hour day, but Bouvier worked in one of the many factories that ignored the law and she would work thirteen hours. The wages were poor and she and her mother would go without food. Her mother would blame her for being so lazy that her employers did not pay her more. Bouvier changed employers to get better wages and the family moved several times, with Bouvier specializing in textile work.

Bouvier was appointed technical advisor and served as an active delegate to the first International Congress of Workers at the first International Labour Conference held in Washington, D.C. in 1919. She was a member of the Women's Employment Committee and participated in various International Congresses of Working Women, including the 1921 congress in Geneva. From 1919 to 1935, she was a member of the Joint Committee for Unemployment Fund. In April 1922, after 27 years of affiliation, she was forced to leave the union.

== Selected works ==
- Deux époques. Deux hommes. Les sauveurs de l'Économie nationale, Paris, Radot, 1927
- La Lingerie et les Lingères, Paris, Gaston Doin et Cie éditeurs, 1928
- Histoire des dames employées dans les postes, télégraphes et téléphones de 1714-1919, Paris-Saint-Amand, les Presses universitaires de France, 1930
- Les Femmes pendant la Révolution. Leur action politique, sociale, économique, militaire, leur courage devant l'échafaud, Paris, Eugène Figuière, 1931
- Mes mémoires, ou, 59 années d'activité industrielle, sociale et intellectuelle d'un ouvrière, Poitiers, l'Action intellectuelle; 1936
