= Moissieu-sur-Dolon =

- Commune
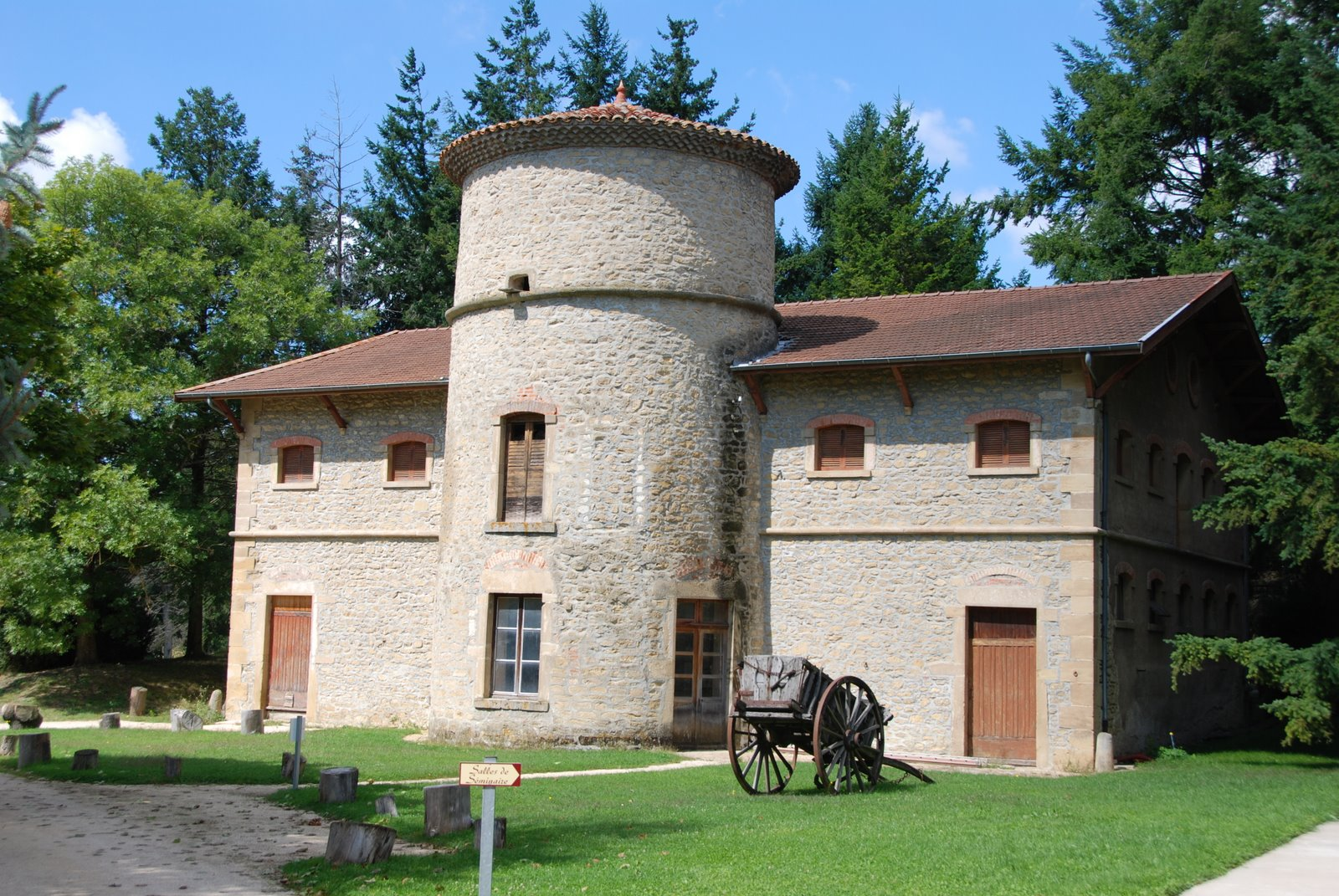
- Dovecote
- Location of Moissieu-sur-Dolon
- Location within France Location within Auvergne-Rhône-Alpes
- Coordinates: 45°23′13″N 4°59′19″E
- Country: France
- Region: Auvergne-Rhône-Alpes
- Department: Isère
- Arrondissement: Vienne
- Canton: Roussillon

Government
  - Mayor (2020–2026): Gilbert Manin
- Area^{1}: 14.38 km^{2} (5.55 sq mi)
- Elevation: 342 m (1,122 ft)
- Highest elevation: 463 m (1,519 ft)
- Lowest elevation: 287 m (942 ft)
- Population (2023): 747
  - Density: 51.9/km^{2} (135/sq mi)
- Time zone: UTC+01:00 (CET)
  - Summer (DST): UTC+02:00 (CEST)
- INSEE/Postal code: 38240 /38270
- ^{1} French Land Register data, which excludes lakes, ponds, glaciers > 1 km^{2} (0.386 sq mi or 247 acres) and river estuaries.

Moissieu-sur-Dolon (French pronunciation: [mwasjø syʁ dɔlɔ̃]) is a commune in the Isère department in southeastern France.

== Population ==
Historical population
Year	Pop.	±% p.a.
1968	372	—
1975	369	−0.12%
1982	407	+1.41%
1990	481	+2.11%
1999	500	+0.43%
2007	679	+3.90%
2012	700	+0.61%
2017	707	+0.20%
2023	747	+0.92%
Source: INSEE

== See also ==
- Communes of the Isère department
