= Cour-et-Buis =

- Commune
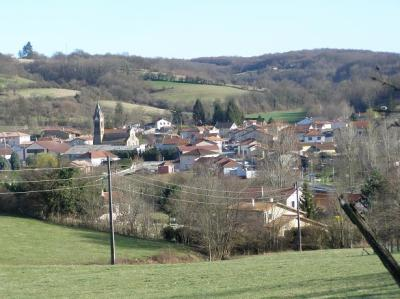
- A general view of Cour-et-Buis
- Location of Cour-et-Buis
- Location within France Location within Auvergne-Rhône-Alpes
- Coordinates: 45°26′28″N 5°00′21″E
- Country: France
- Region: Auvergne-Rhône-Alpes
- Department: Isère
- Arrondissement: Vienne
- Canton: Roussillon

Government
  - Mayor (2020–2026): Jacques Garnier
- Area^{1}: 13.73 km^{2} (5.30 sq mi)
- Elevation: 343 m (1,125 ft)
- Highest elevation: 462 m (1,516 ft)
- Lowest elevation: 328 m (1,076 ft)
- Population (2023): 920
  - Density: 67/km^{2} (170/sq mi)
- Time zone: UTC+01:00 (CET)
  - Summer (DST): UTC+02:00 (CEST)
- INSEE/Postal code: 38134 /38122
- ^{1} French Land Register data, which excludes lakes, ponds, glaciers > 1 km^{2} (0.386 sq mi or 247 acres) and river estuaries.

Cour-et-Buis (French pronunciation: [kuʁ e bɥi]) is a commune in the Isère department in southeastern France.

== Population ==
Historical population
Year	Pop.	±% p.a.
1968	408	—
1975	424	+0.55%
1982	497	+2.30%
1990	571	+1.75%
1999	726	+2.70%
2007	836	+1.78%
2012	859	+0.54%
2017	879	+0.46%
2023	920	+0.76%
Source: INSEE

== See also ==
- Communes of the Isère department
