= Roussillon, Isère =

Roussillon
- Commune
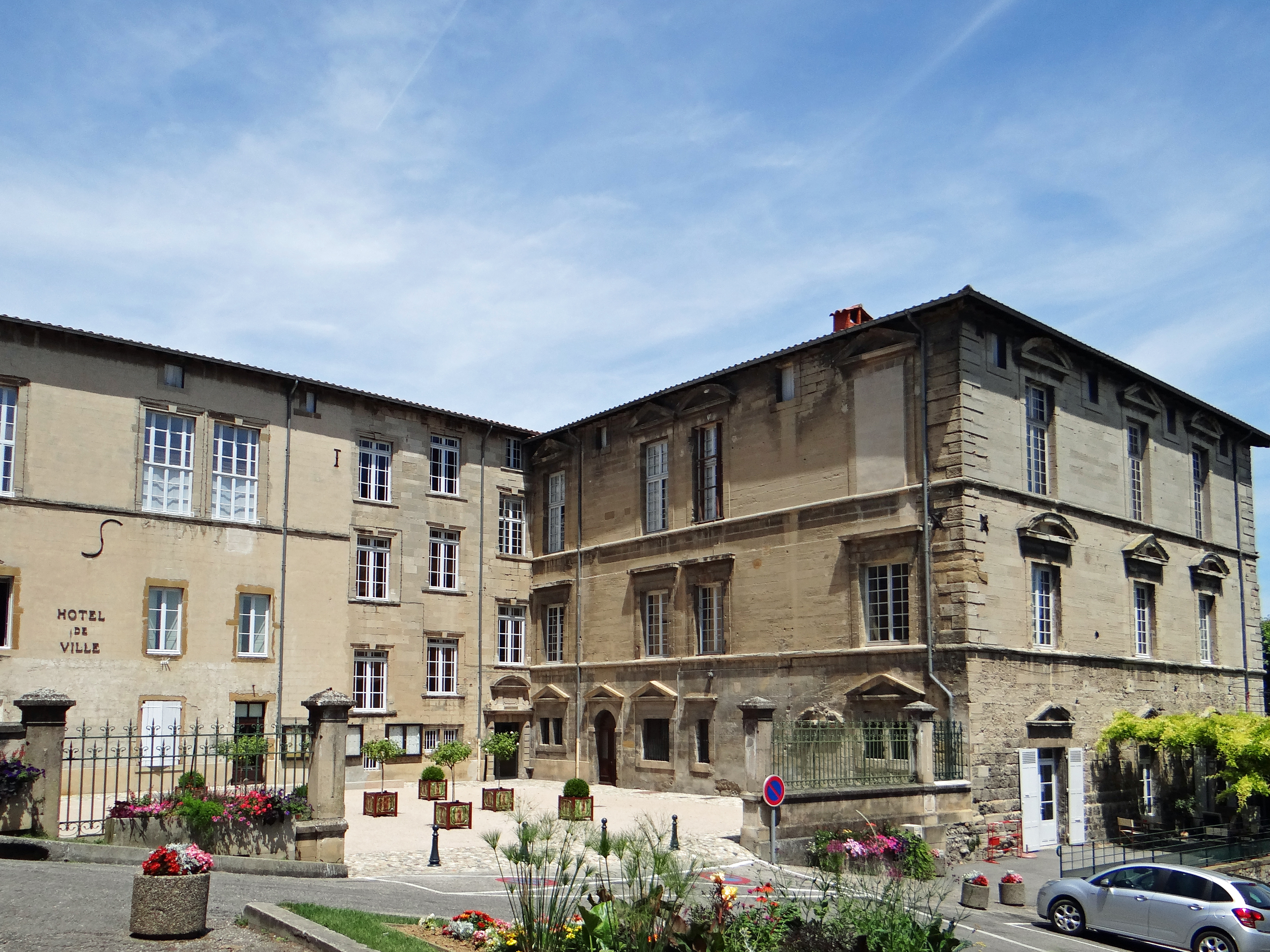
- The old chateau where Charles IX signed the edict in 1564
- Location of Roussillon
- Location within France Location within Auvergne-Rhône-Alpes
- Coordinates: 45°22′19″N 4°49′38″E
- Country: France
- Region: Auvergne-Rhône-Alpes
- Department: Isère
- Arrondissement: Vienne
- Canton: Roussillon

Government
  - Mayor (2020–2026): Robert Duranton
- Area^{1}: 11.62 km^{2} (4.49 sq mi)
- Highest elevation: 265 m (869 ft)
- Lowest elevation: 146 m (479 ft)
- Population (2023): 8,595
  - Density: 739.7/km^{2} (1,916/sq mi)
- Time zone: UTC+01:00 (CET)
  - Summer (DST): UTC+02:00 (CEST)
- INSEE/Postal code: 38344 /38150
- ^{1} French Land Register data, which excludes lakes, ponds, glaciers > 1 km^{2} (0.386 sq mi or 247 acres) and river estuaries.

Roussillon (French pronunciation: [ʁusijɔ̃]) is a commune in the Isère department in southeastern France.

== Population ==
Historical population

Year	Pop.	±% p.a.
1793	1,549	—
1800	863	−8.02%
1806	937	+1.38%
1821	1,260	+1.99%
1831	1,337	+0.59%
1836	1,400	+0.93%
1841	1,594	+2.63%
1846	1,562	−0.40%
1851	1,532	−0.39%
1856	1,504	−0.37%
1861	1,528	+0.32%
1866	1,525	−0.04%
1872	1,578	+0.57%
1876	1,435	−2.35%
1881	1,478	+0.59%
1886	1,485	+0.09%
1891	1,277	−2.97%
1896	1,329	+0.80%
1901	1,263	−1.01%

Year	Pop.	±% p.a.
1906	1,171	−1.50%
1911	1,172	+0.02%
1921	1,195	+0.19%
1926	2,280	+13.79%
1931	3,088	+6.25%
1936	3,102	+0.09%
1946	3,576	+1.43%
1954	4,623	+3.26%
1962	6,588	+4.53%
1968	7,339	+1.82%
1975	7,551	+0.41%
1982	7,173	−0.73%
1990	7,365	+0.33%
1999	7,437	+0.11%
2007	7,933	+0.81%
2012	8,012	+0.20%
2017	8,455	+1.08%
2023	8,595	+0.27%

Source: EHESS and INSEE (1968-2023)

== See also ==
- Communes of the Isère department
