= Salaise-sur-Sanne =

- Commune
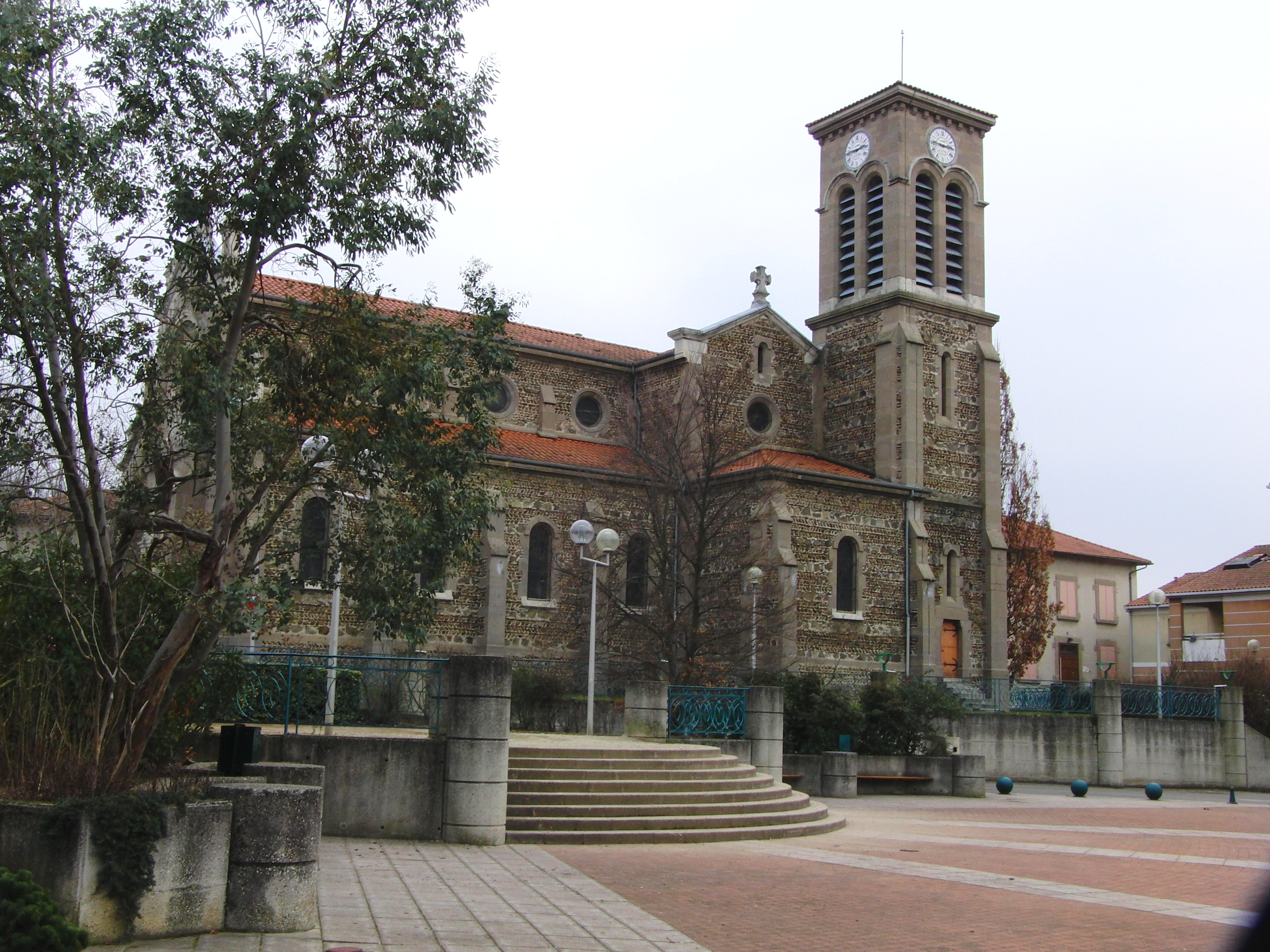
- The church of Salaise-sur-Sanne
- Location of Salaise-sur-Sanne
- Location within France Location within Auvergne-Rhône-Alpes
- Coordinates: 45°20′43″N 4°49′12″E
- Country: France
- Region: Auvergne-Rhône-Alpes
- Department: Isère
- Arrondissement: Vienne
- Canton: Roussillon

Government
  - Mayor (2020–2026): Gilles Vial
- Area^{1}: 16.11 km^{2} (6.22 sq mi)
- Elevation: 134 m (440 ft)
- Highest elevation: 234 m (768 ft)
- Lowest elevation: 137 m (449 ft)
- Population (2023): 4,606
  - Density: 285.9/km^{2} (740.5/sq mi)
- Time zone: UTC+01:00 (CET)
  - Summer (DST): UTC+02:00 (CEST)
- INSEE/Postal code: 38468 /38150
- ^{1} French Land Register data, which excludes lakes, ponds, glaciers > 1 km^{2} (0.386 sq mi or 247 acres) and river estuaries.

Salaise-sur-Sanne (French pronunciation: [salɛz syʁ san]) is a commune in the Isère department in southeastern France.

== Population ==
Historical population

Year	Pop.	±% p.a.
1793	756	—
1821	908	+0.66%
1846	1,092	+0.74%
1872	1,056	−0.13%
1901	908	−0.52%
1926	1,241	+1.26%
1946	2,505	+3.57%
1962	2,609	+0.25%
1968	2,785	+1.09%

Year	Pop.	±% p.a.
1975	2,978	+0.96%
1982	3,354	+1.71%
1990	3,513	+0.58%
1999	3,648	+0.42%
2007	4,096	+1.46%
2012	4,270	+0.84%
2017	4,513	+1.11%
2023	4,606	+0.34%

Source: EHESS and INSEE (1968-2023)

== Notable people ==
- Jeanne Bouvier

== See also ==
- Communes of the Isère department
