= Chanas, Isère =

Chanas
- Commune
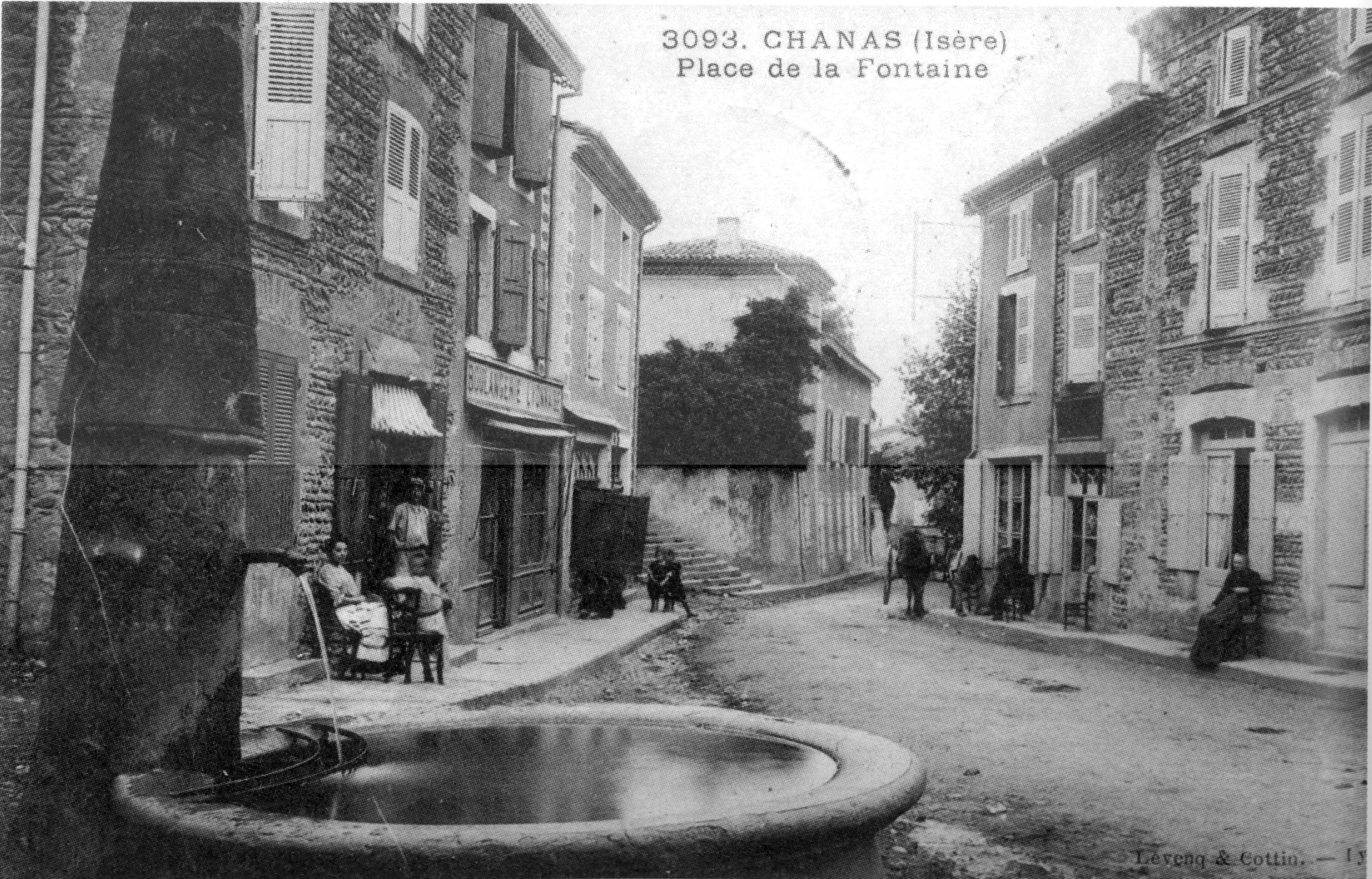
- The fountain in 1908
- Location of Chanas
- Location within France Location within Auvergne-Rhône-Alpes
- Coordinates: 45°19′09″N 4°49′11″E
- Country: France
- Region: Auvergne-Rhône-Alpes
- Department: Isère
- Arrondissement: Vienne
- Canton: Roussillon

Government
  - Mayor (2020–2026): Jean-Charles Malatrait
- Area^{1}: 11.69 km^{2} (4.51 sq mi)
- Elevation: 170 m (560 ft)
- Highest elevation: 223 m (732 ft)
- Lowest elevation: 142 m (466 ft)
- Population (2023): 2,706
  - Density: 231.5/km^{2} (599.5/sq mi)
- Time zone: UTC+01:00 (CET)
  - Summer (DST): UTC+02:00 (CEST)
- INSEE/Postal code: 38072 /38150
- ^{1} French Land Register data, which excludes lakes, ponds, glaciers > 1 km^{2} (0.386 sq mi or 247 acres) and river estuaries.

Chanas (French pronunciation: [ʃana]) is a commune in the Isère department in southeastern France.

== Population ==
Historical population

Year	Pop.	±% p.a.
1793	597	—
1800	798	+4.23%
1806	807	+0.19%
1821	974	+1.26%
1831	1,099	+1.21%
1836	1,095	−0.07%
1841	1,172	+1.37%
1846	1,250	+1.30%
1851	1,340	+1.40%
1856	1,347	+0.10%
1861	1,233	−1.75%
1866	1,150	−1.38%
1872	1,113	−0.54%
1876	1,186	+1.60%
1881	1,150	−0.61%
1886	1,216	+1.12%
1891	1,240	+0.39%
1896	1,182	−0.95%
1901	1,187	+0.08%

Year	Pop.	±% p.a.
1906	1,210	+0.38%
1911	1,104	−1.82%
1921	1,074	−0.28%
1926	1,108	+0.63%
1931	1,155	+0.83%
1936	1,174	+0.33%
1946	1,274	+0.82%
1954	1,351	+0.74%
1962	1,289	−0.59%
1968	1,373	+1.06%
1975	1,449	+0.77%
1982	1,482	+0.32%
1990	1,725	+1.92%
1999	1,929	+1.25%
2007	2,302	+2.23%
2012	2,377	+0.64%
2017	2,589	+1.72%
2023	2,706	+0.74%

Source: EHESS and INSEE (1968-2023)

== See also ==
- Communes of the Isère department
