= Ville-sous-Anjou =

- Commune
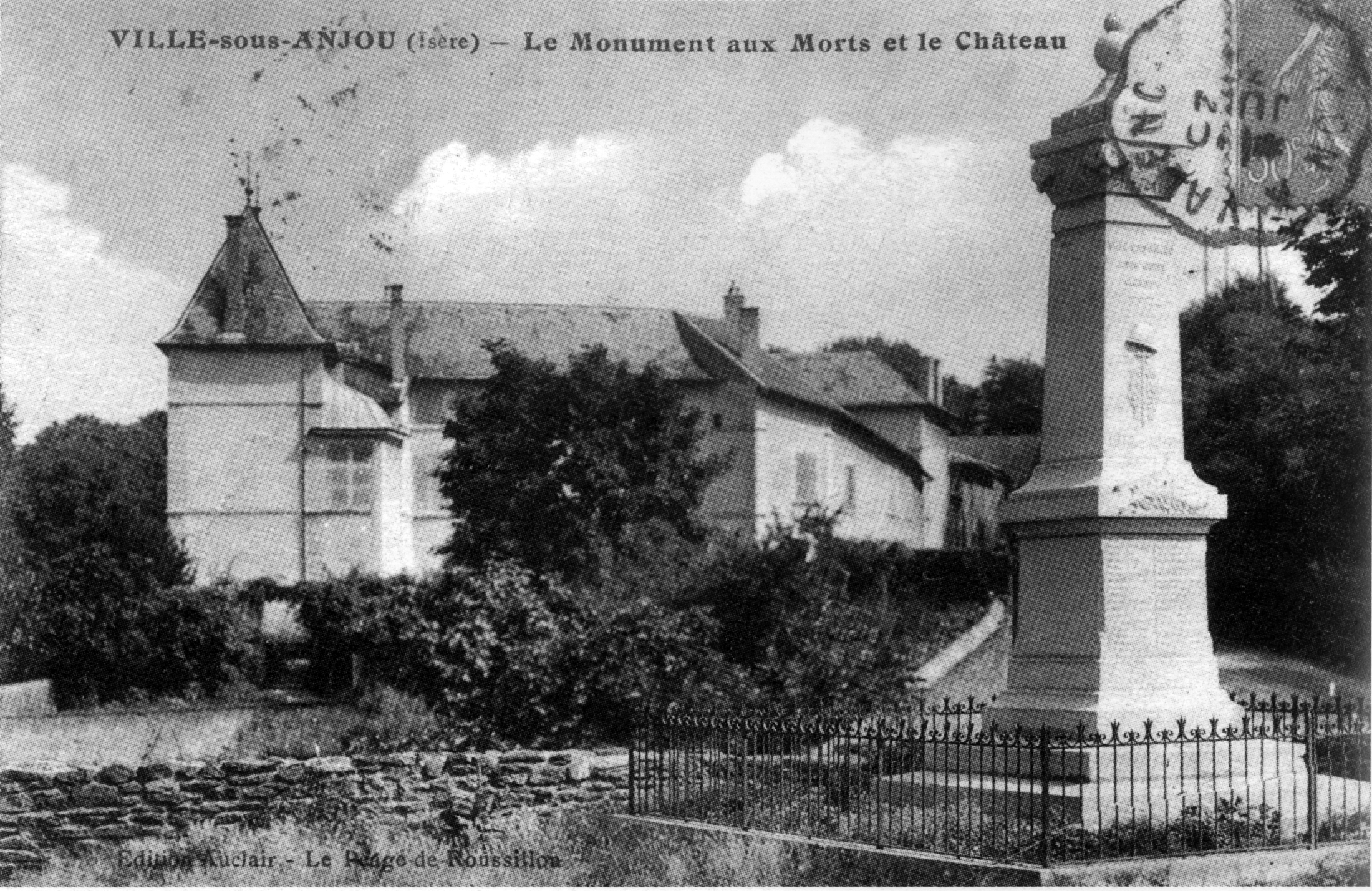
- Ville-sous-Anjou in 1920

- Coat of arms
- Location of Ville-sous-Anjou
- Location within France Location within Auvergne-Rhône-Alpes
- Coordinates: 45°21′46″N 4°51′51″E
- Country: France
- Region: Auvergne-Rhône-Alpes
- Department: Isère
- Arrondissement: Vienne
- Canton: Roussillon

Government
  - Mayor (2020–2026): Luc Satre
- Area^{1}: 18.25 km^{2} (7.05 sq mi)
- Elevation: 259 m (850 ft)
- Highest elevation: 401 m (1,316 ft)
- Lowest elevation: 186 m (610 ft)
- Population (2023): 1,175
  - Density: 64.38/km^{2} (166.8/sq mi)
- Time zone: UTC+01:00 (CET)
  - Summer (DST): UTC+02:00 (CEST)
- INSEE/Postal code: 38556 /38150
- ^{1} French Land Register data, which excludes lakes, ponds, glaciers > 1 km^{2} (0.386 sq mi or 247 acres) and river estuaries.

Ville-sous-Anjou (French pronunciation: [vil su.z‿ɑ̃ʒu]) is a commune in the Isère department in southeastern France.

== Population ==
Historical population
Year	Pop.	±% p.a.
1968	606	—
1975	587	−0.45%
1982	765	+3.86%
1990	920	+2.33%
1999	1,009	+1.03%
2007	1,106	+1.15%
2012	1,151	+0.80%
2017	1,173	+0.38%
2023	1,175	+0.03%
Source: INSEE

== Sights ==
- The animal museum

== See also ==
- Communes of the Isère department
