= Beaurepaire, Isère =

Beaurepaire
- Commune
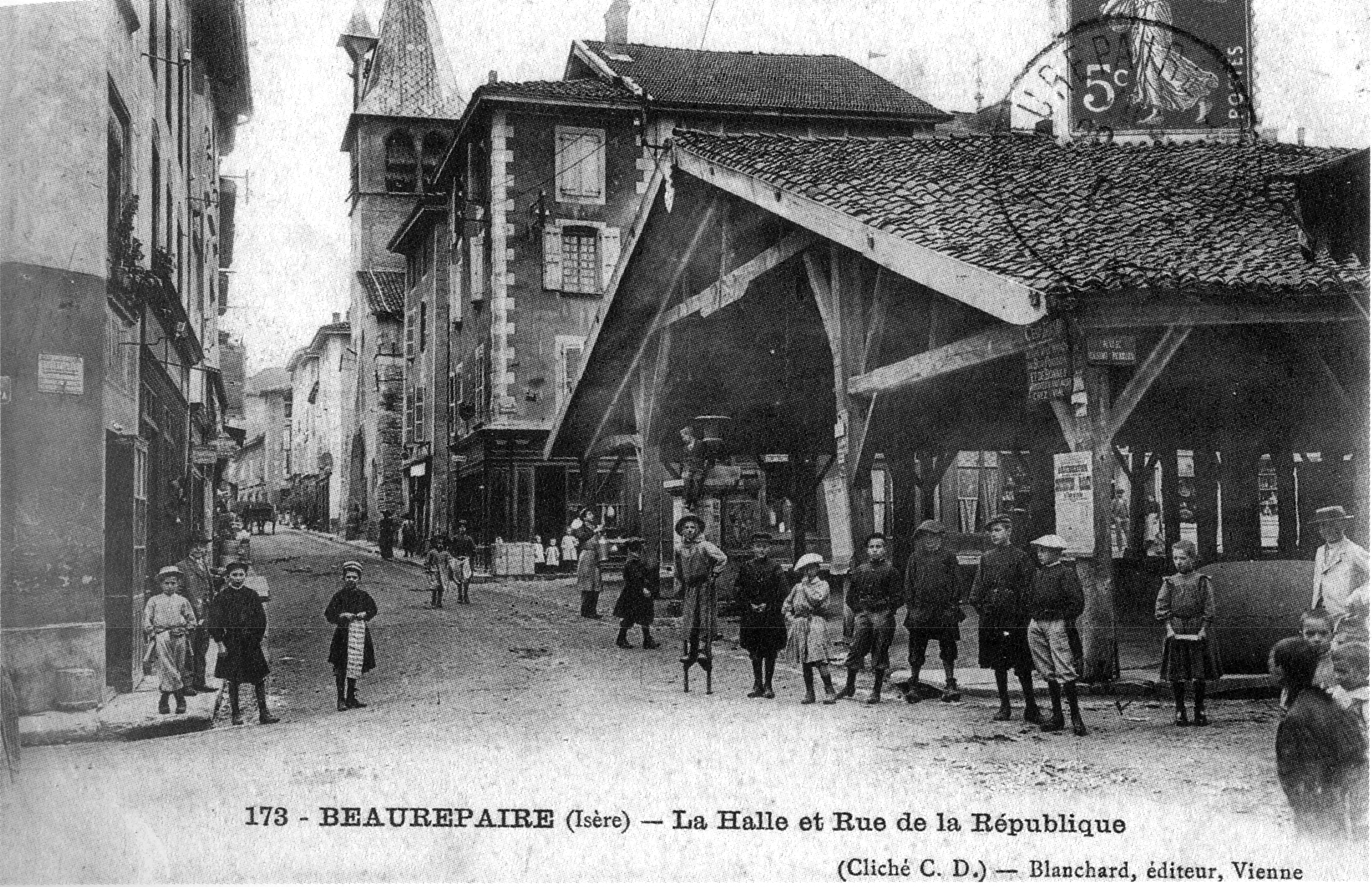
- The covered market and the rue de la République, in 1908

- Coat of arms
- Location of Beaurepaire
- Location within France Location within Auvergne-Rhône-Alpes
- Coordinates: 45°20′21″N 5°03′19″E
- Country: France
- Region: Auvergne-Rhône-Alpes
- Department: Isère
- Arrondissement: Vienne
- Canton: Roussillon

Government
  - Mayor (2020–2026): Yannick Paque
- Area^{1}: 18.46 km^{2} (7.13 sq mi)
- Elevation: 258 m (846 ft)
- Highest elevation: 315 m (1,033 ft)
- Lowest elevation: 225 m (738 ft)
- Population (2023): 5,010
  - Density: 271/km^{2} (703/sq mi)
- Time zone: UTC+01:00 (CET)
  - Summer (DST): UTC+02:00 (CEST)
- INSEE/Postal code: 38034 /38270
- ^{1} French Land Register data, which excludes lakes, ponds, glaciers > 1 km^{2} (0.386 sq mi or 247 acres) and river estuaries.

Beaurepaire (French pronunciation: [boʁpɛʁ]) is a commune in the Isère department in southeastern France.

== Population ==
Historical population
Year	Pop.	±% p.a.
1968	3,583	—
1975	3,666	+0.33%
1982	3,793	+0.49%
1990	3,735	−0.19%
1999	3,839	+0.31%
2007	4,360	+1.60%
2012	4,676	+1.41%
2017	4,921	+1.03%
2023	5,010	+0.30%
Source: INSEE

== History ==
Beaurepaire was the first town in France to be fitted with electric lanterns.

== Sports ==
It is well known to rugby enthusiasts for its first division team, and its affiliation with ex-internationals Marc Cécillon and Olivier Milloud.

== Amenities ==
Beaurepaire has a cinema and a stadium, as well as a train station (which has been in disuse since at least the early 2000s (decade) ).

== Twin towns ==
Beaurepaire is twinned with:

- Auenwald, Germany, since 1987

== See also ==
- Communes of the Isère department
