= Bougé-Chambalud =

- Commune
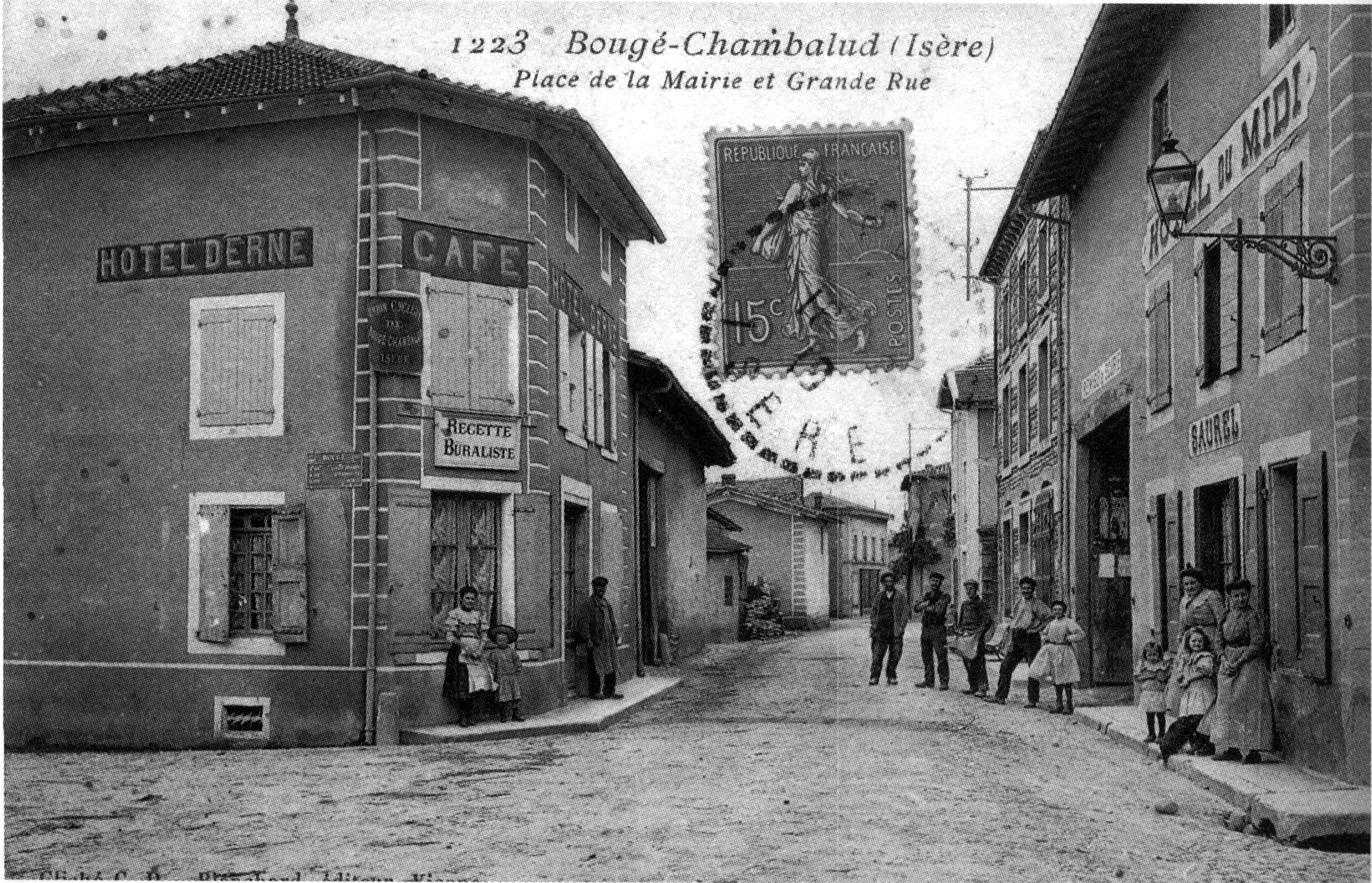
- The town hall square and main road in 1919
- Location of Bougé-Chambalud
- Location within France Location within Auvergne-Rhône-Alpes
- Coordinates: 45°19′52″N 4°54′08″E
- Country: France
- Region: Auvergne-Rhône-Alpes
- Department: Isère
- Arrondissement: Vienne
- Canton: Roussillon

Government
  - Mayor (2020–2026): Sébastien André
- Area^{1}: 15.85 km^{2} (6.12 sq mi)
- Elevation: 220 m (720 ft)
- Highest elevation: 232 m (761 ft)
- Lowest elevation: 172 m (564 ft)
- Population (2023): 1,467
  - Density: 92.56/km^{2} (239.7/sq mi)
- Time zone: UTC+01:00 (CET)
  - Summer (DST): UTC+02:00 (CEST)
- INSEE/Postal code: 38051 /38150
- ^{1} French Land Register data, which excludes lakes, ponds, glaciers > 1 km^{2} (0.386 sq mi or 247 acres) and river estuaries.

Bougé-Chambalud (French pronunciation: [buʒe ʃɑ̃baly]) is a commune in the Isère department in southeastern France.

== Population ==
Historical population
Year	Pop.	±% p.a.
1968	789	—
1975	717	−1.36%
1982	672	−0.92%
1990	814	+2.43%
1999	918	+1.34%
2007	1,171	+3.09%
2012	1,365	+3.11%
2017	1,375	+0.15%
2023	1,467	+1.09%
Source: INSEE

== See also ==
- Communes of the Isère department
