= Sonnay =

- Commune
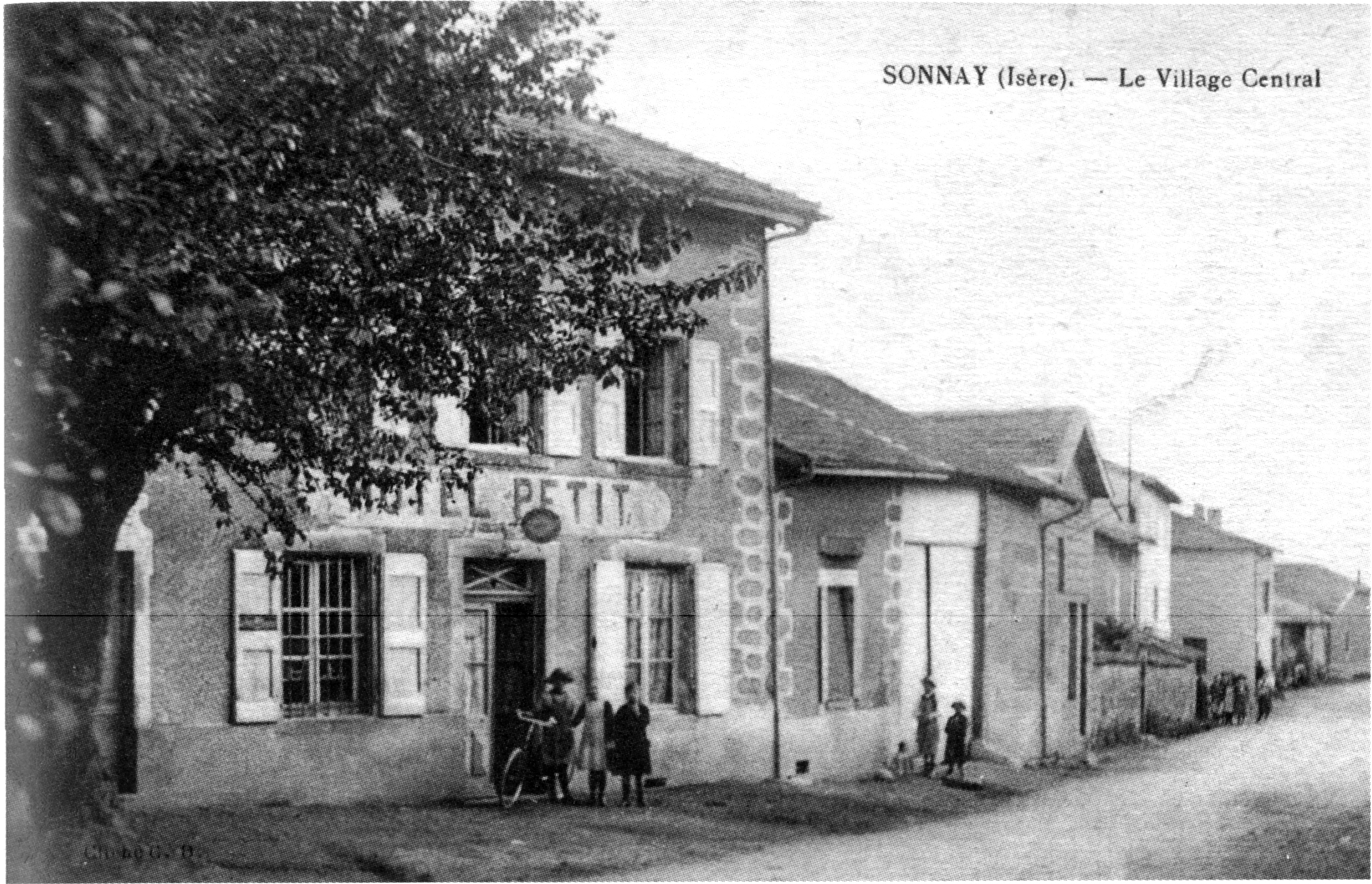
- Sonnay in 1910

- Coat of arms
- Location of Sonnay
- Location within France Location within Auvergne-Rhône-Alpes
- Coordinates: 45°21′20″N 4°54′27″E
- Country: France
- Region: Auvergne-Rhône-Alpes
- Department: Isère
- Arrondissement: Vienne
- Canton: Roussillon
- Intercommunality: Entre Bièvre et Rhône

Government
  - Mayor (2020–2026): Claude Lhermet
- Area^{1}: 14.17 km^{2} (5.47 sq mi)
- Elevation: 235 m (771 ft)
- Highest elevation: 407 m (1,335 ft)
- Lowest elevation: 225 m (738 ft)
- Population (2023): 1,234
  - Density: 87.09/km^{2} (225.6/sq mi)
- Time zone: UTC+01:00 (CET)
  - Summer (DST): UTC+02:00 (CEST)
- INSEE/Postal code: 38496 /38150
- ^{1} French Land Register data, which excludes lakes, ponds, glaciers > 1 km^{2} (0.386 sq mi or 247 acres) and river estuaries.

Sonnay (French pronunciation: [sɔnɛ]) is a commune in the Isère department in southeastern France.

== Population ==
Historical population
Year	Pop.	±% p.a.
1968	622	—
1975	636	+0.32%
1982	689	+1.15%
1990	853	+2.70%
1999	959	+1.31%
2007	1,246	+3.33%
2012	1,268	+0.35%
2017	1,241	−0.43%
2023	1,234	−0.09%
Source: INSEE

== See also ==
- Communes of the Isère department
