= Mademoiselle (2001 film) =

2001 French film by Philippe Lioret

- Theatrical release poster
- Directed by: Philippe Lioret
- Written by: Philippe Lioret; Christian Sinniger; Emmanuel Courcol
- Produced by: Patrick Godeau
- Starring: Sandrine Bonnaire; Jacques Gamblin
- Cinematography: Bertrand Chatry
- Edited by: Mireille Leroy
- Music by: Philippe Sarde
- Distributed by: Rezo Films
- Release date: 1 March 2001
- Running time: 85 minutes
- Country: France
- Language: French
- Budget: €4.8 million
- Box office: $2.5 million

Mademoiselle is a 2001 French comedy film directed by Philippe Lioret. It was entered into the 23rd Moscow International Film Festival.

== Plot ==
At a company party Claire sees three actors who work as an improvisational theatre. After the party she misses the bus but the three artists have a car and offer to take her to the railway station. When they are underway it turns out the artists have already a new engagement. They are supposed to perform at a wedding party the very same day. Claire accompanies them and misses her train. She falls in love with one of the artists. They spend the night together.

== Cast ==
- Sandrine Bonnaire as Claire Canselier
- Jacques Gamblin as Pierre Cassini
- Isabelle Candelier as Alice Cohen
- Zinedine Soualem as Karim Coutard
- Jacques Boudet as Gilbert Frémont
- Patrick Mercado as Nounours
- Philippe Beglia as Philippe Carioux
- Maryvonne Schiltz as Elisabeth Carioux
- Gérard Lartigau as Henri Blasco
- Blandine Pélissier (credited as Blandine Pelissier) as the pharmacist
- Olivier Cruveiller as Villeval
- Alain Cauchi as Granier

== Production ==
Filming took place in the summer of 2000 in Annecy (Haute-Savoie); in Feyzin, Décines and Villefranche-sur-Saône (Rhône); in Chambéry and Aix-les-Bains (Savoie); and in L'Isle-d'Abeau, Montcarra and Faverges-de-la-Tour (Isère).

== Accolades ==
Award / Film Festival	Category	Recipients and nominees	Result
Cabourg Film Festival	Best Actress	Sandrine Bonnaire	Won
Moscow International Film Festival	Golden St. George		Nominated
