= La Bâtie-Montgascon =

- Commune
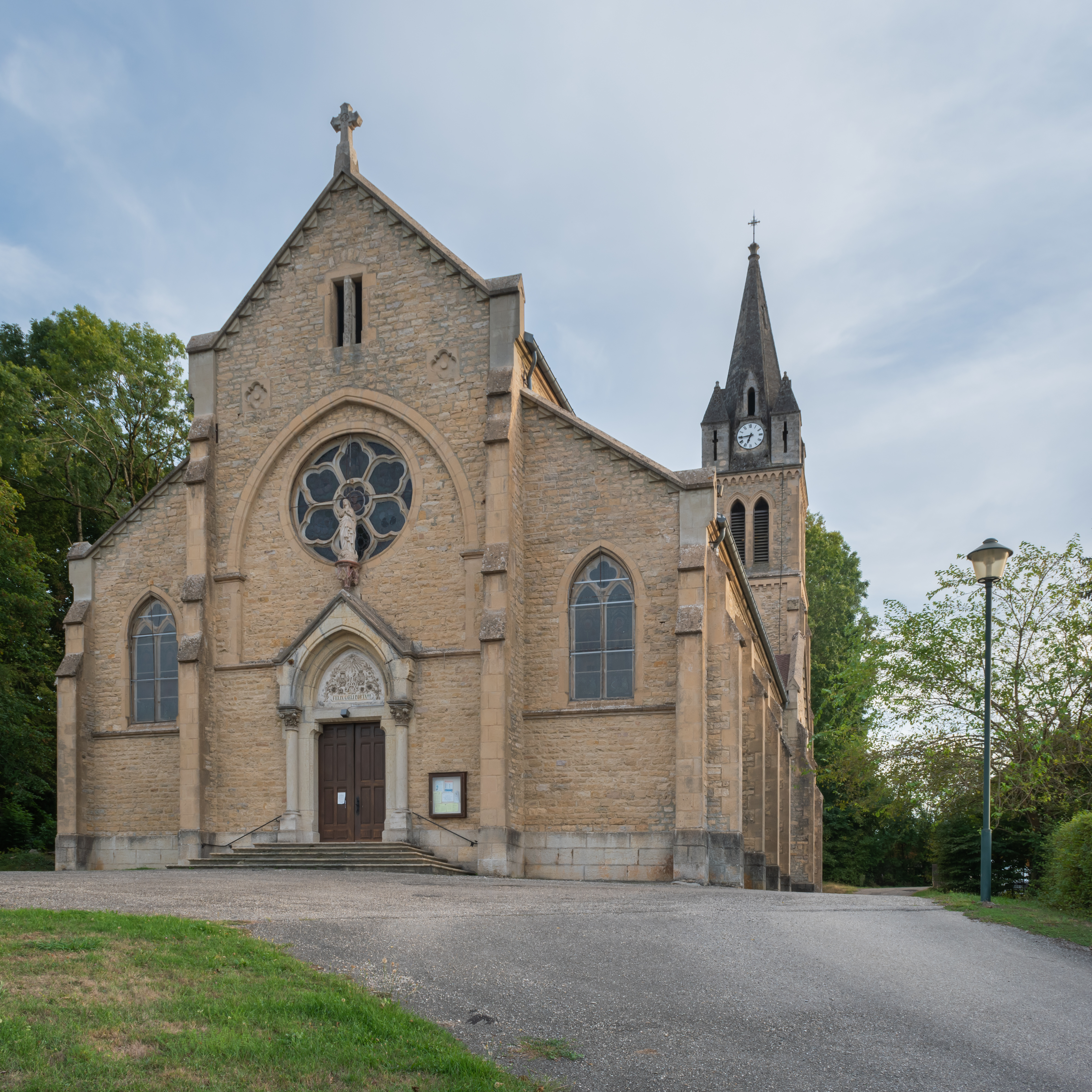
- Saint Symphorian church in La Batie-Montgascon
- Location of La Bâtie-Montgascon
- Location within France Location within Auvergne-Rhône-Alpes
- Coordinates: 45°34′48″N 5°31′43″E
- Country: France
- Region: Auvergne-Rhône-Alpes
- Department: Isère
- Arrondissement: La Tour-du-Pin
- Canton: La Tour-du-Pin
- Intercommunality: Les Vals du Dauphiné

Government
  - Mayor (2020–2026): Nicolas Solier
- Area^{1}: 8.43 km^{2} (3.25 sq mi)
- Elevation: 390 m (1,280 ft)
- Highest elevation: 425 m (1,394 ft)
- Lowest elevation: 314 m (1,030 ft)
- Population (2023): 2,035
  - Density: 241/km^{2} (625/sq mi)
- Time zone: UTC+01:00 (CET)
  - Summer (DST): UTC+02:00 (CEST)
- INSEE/Postal code: 38029 /38110
- ^{1} French Land Register data, which excludes lakes, ponds, glaciers > 1 km^{2} (0.386 sq mi or 247 acres) and river estuaries.

La Bâtie-Montgascon (French pronunciation: [la bati mɔ̃ɡaskɔ̃]) is a commune in the Isère department in the Auvergne-Rhône-Alpes region of south-eastern France.

The inhabitants of the commune are known as Batiolans or Batiolanes.

== Geography ==
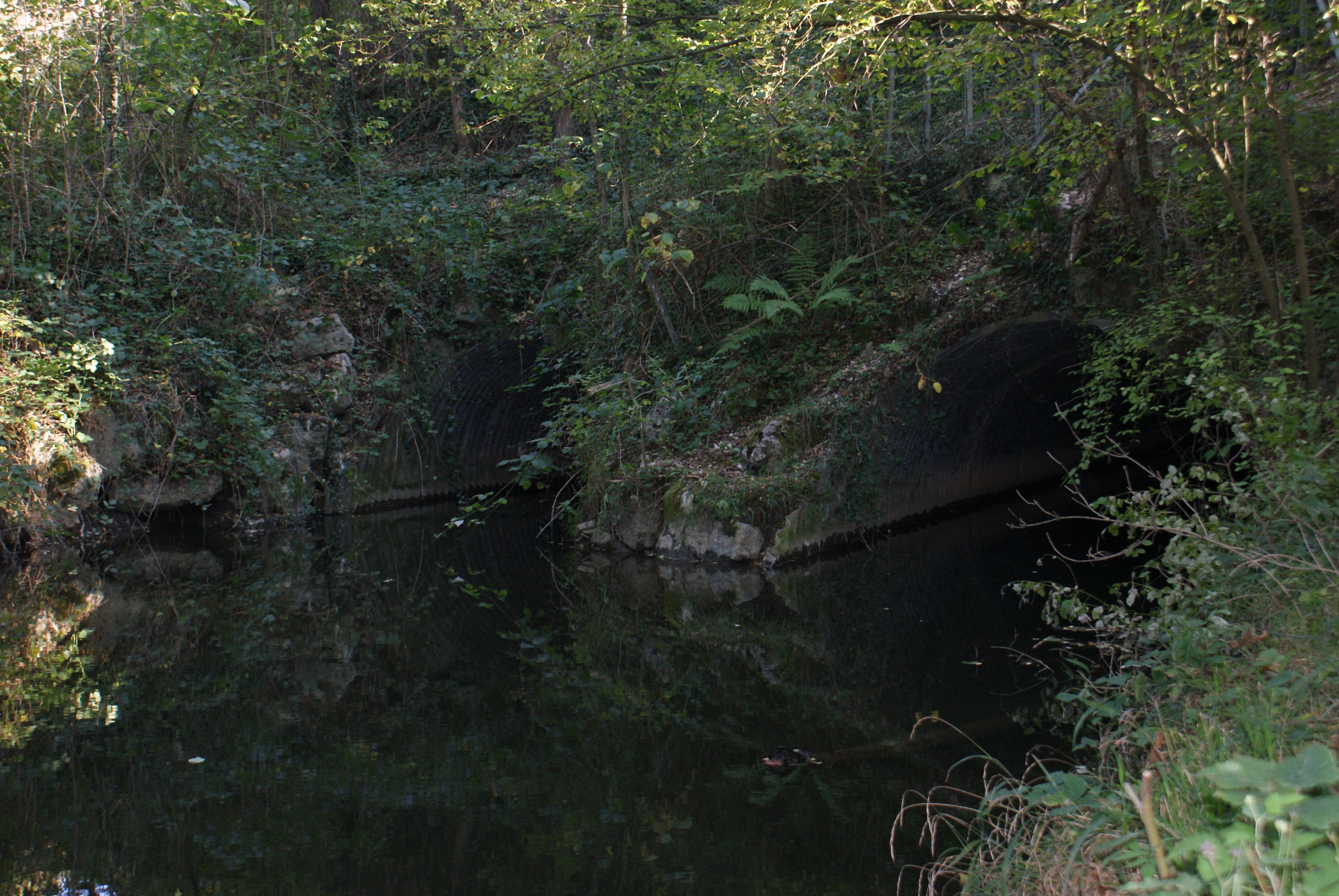
The Bourbre river

La Bâtie-Montgascon is located some 20 km east by south-east of Bourgoin-Jallieu and 25 km west of La Motte-Servolex. Access to the commune is by the D1516 road from La Tour-du-Pin in the west which passes through the north of the commune and the village before continuing east to Aoste. The D1075 comes from Veyrins-Thuellin in the north and passes through the hamlet of Evrieu in the commune before continuing south-east to Les Abrets. The A43 autoroute passes through the south of the commune from west to east but has no exit in the commune. The nearest exit is Exit 10 east of the commune at Chimilin. Apart from the main village there are the hamlets of Évrieu, Avolin, Trévignieux, and Boutière. The commune is almost all farmland with a few small forests and small lakes.

The Bourbre forms the southern border of the commune as it flows west to eventually join the Rhône near Chavanoz.

== Toponymy ==
La Bâtie-Montgascon appears as La Batie Mongafco on the 1750 Cassini Map and as la Batie on the 1790 version.

== Administration ==
List of Successive Mayors

From	To	Name
2001	2020	Gilbert Joye
2020	2026	Nicolas Solier

== Demography ==
Historical population

Year	Pop.	±% p.a.
1793	1,318	—
1800	1,545	+2.30%
1806	1,659	+1.19%
1821	1,844	+0.71%
1831	1,311	−3.35%
1836	1,361	+0.75%
1841	1,381	+0.29%
1846	1,379	−0.03%
1851	1,485	+1.49%
1856	1,471	−0.19%
1861	1,462	−0.12%
1866	1,523	+0.82%
1872	1,565	+0.45%
1876	1,524	−0.66%
1881	1,555	+0.40%
1886	1,547	−0.10%
1891	1,386	−2.17%
1896	1,375	−0.16%
1901	1,302	−1.09%

Year	Pop.	±% p.a.
1906	1,260	−0.65%
1911	1,263	+0.05%
1921	1,178	−0.69%
1926	1,171	−0.12%
1931	1,186	+0.25%
1936	1,123	−1.09%
1946	1,104	−0.17%
1954	1,116	+0.14%
1962	1,158	+0.46%
1968	1,206	+0.68%
1975	1,279	+0.84%
1982	1,296	+0.19%
1990	1,310	+0.13%
1999	1,435	+1.02%
2007	1,679	+1.98%
2012	1,824	+1.67%
2017	1,919	+1.02%
2023	2,035	+0.98%

Source: EHESS and INSEE

== Local Culture and Heritage ==
=== Sites and Monuments ===
- An Ancient hilltop village
- The Chateau de Renodel
- A Church from the 19th century

=== Cultural Heritage ===
- A Living Museum of Dauphinois weaving
- A Multipurpose meeting hall (work completed in 2009)

== Notable people linked to the commune ==
- Dr Victor Prunelle (1777-1853). Owner of the Château du Vion, his tomb is in the cemetery at La Bätie-Montgascon. A doctor and politician, he was MP for Isère, mayor of Lyon and of Vichy. He tried to quell the revolt of the Canuts in Lyon (21–24 November 1831).
- Pierre Marion (1914-2000) born in La Bâtie-Montgascon. Heart surgeon, he devoted his life to the development of artificial heart valves
- Gérard Nicoud had a bar-restaurant in La Bâtie-Montgascon.
- Patrick Piot, professional motorcycle driver, born in 1967 at Bourgoin-Jallieu, lives in La Bâtie-Montgascon.

== See also ==
- Communes of the Isère department
