= Bourbre =

River in eastern France

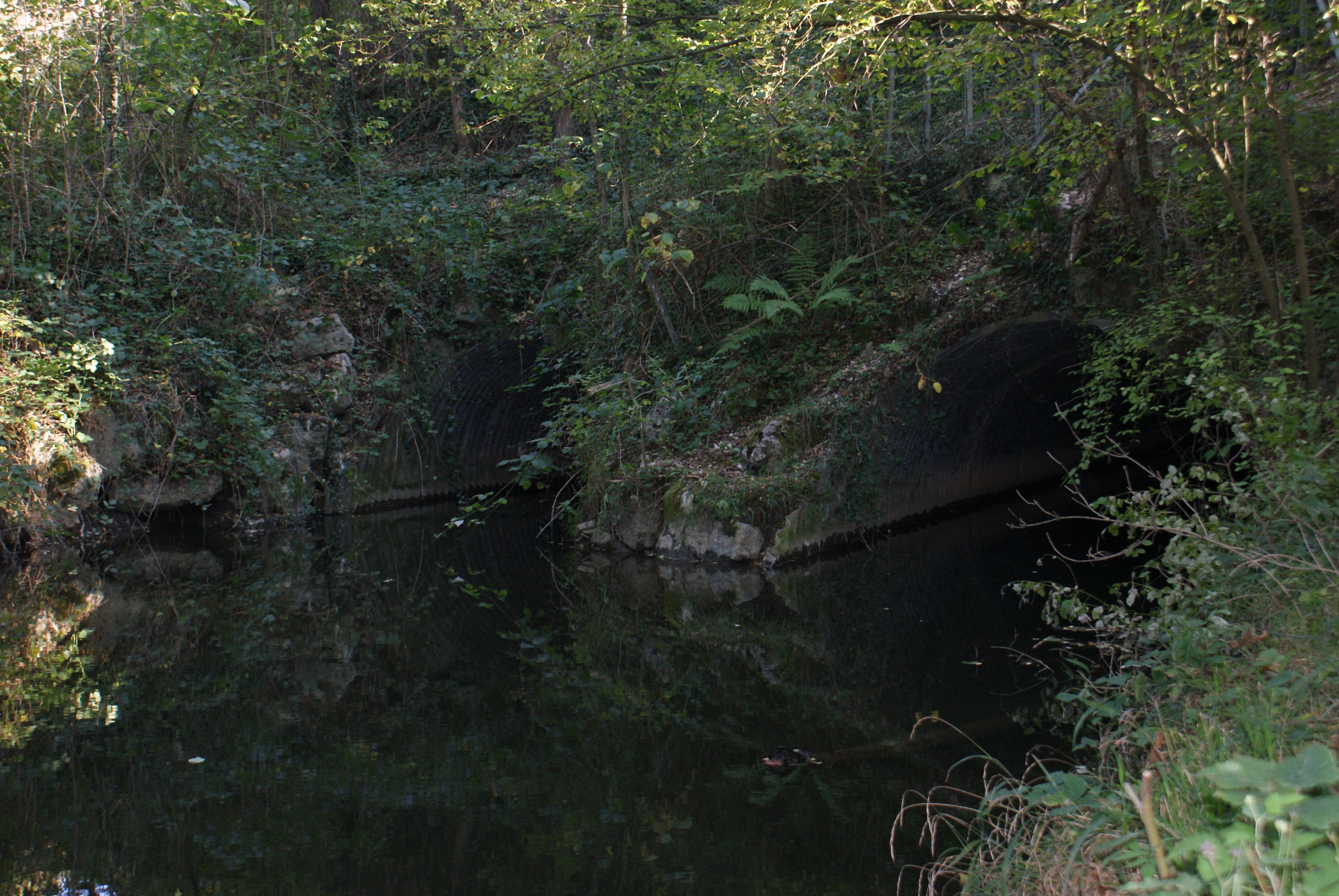
- The Bourbre at La Bâtie-Montgascon

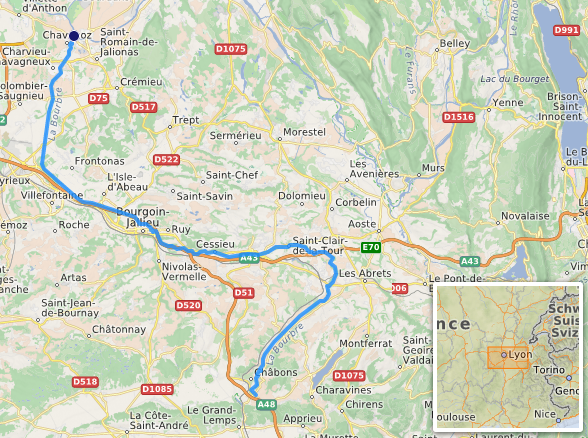

Location
- Country: France

Physical characteristics
- Source
  - location: Burcin
  - coordinates: 45°25′57″N 05°25′56″E
  - elevation: 495 m (1,624 ft)
- Mouth
  - location: Rhône
  - coordinates: 45°46′25″N 05°11′15″E
  - elevation: 190 m (620 ft)
- Length: 72.3 km (44.9 mi)
- Basin size: 703 km^{2} (271 sq mi)
- Discharge
  - average: 7.85 m^{3}/s (277 cu ft/s)

Basin features
- Progression: Rhône→ Mediterranean Sea

The Bourbre (French pronunciation: [buʁbʁ]) is a 72.3 km (44.9 mi) long river in the Isère and Rhône departments in central eastern France. Its source is in Burcin. It flows generally north-northwest. It is a left tributary of the Rhône, into which it flows at Chavanoz.

== Departments and communes along its course ==
This list is ordered from source to mouth:

- Isère: Burcin, Châbons, Virieu, Blandin, Panissage, Chélieu, Chassignieu, Le Passage, Saint-Ondras, Saint-André-le-Gaz, Les Abrets-en-Dauphiné, La Bâtie-Montgascon, Saint-Didier-de-la-Tour, Saint-Clair-de-la-Tour, La Tour-du-Pin, Saint-Jean-de-Soudain, Rochetoirin, Cessieu, Sérézin-de-la-Tour, Ruy, Nivolas-Vermelle, Bourgoin-Jallieu, L'Isle-d'Abeau, Vaulx-Milieu, Villefontaine, La Verpillière, Saint-Quentin-Fallavier, Chamagnieu, Satolas-et-Bonce
- Rhône: Colombier-Saugnieu
- Isère: Tignieu-Jameyzieu, Charvieu-Chavagneux, Pont-de-Chéruy, Chavanoz,
