= Saint-Didier-de-la-Tour =

- Commune
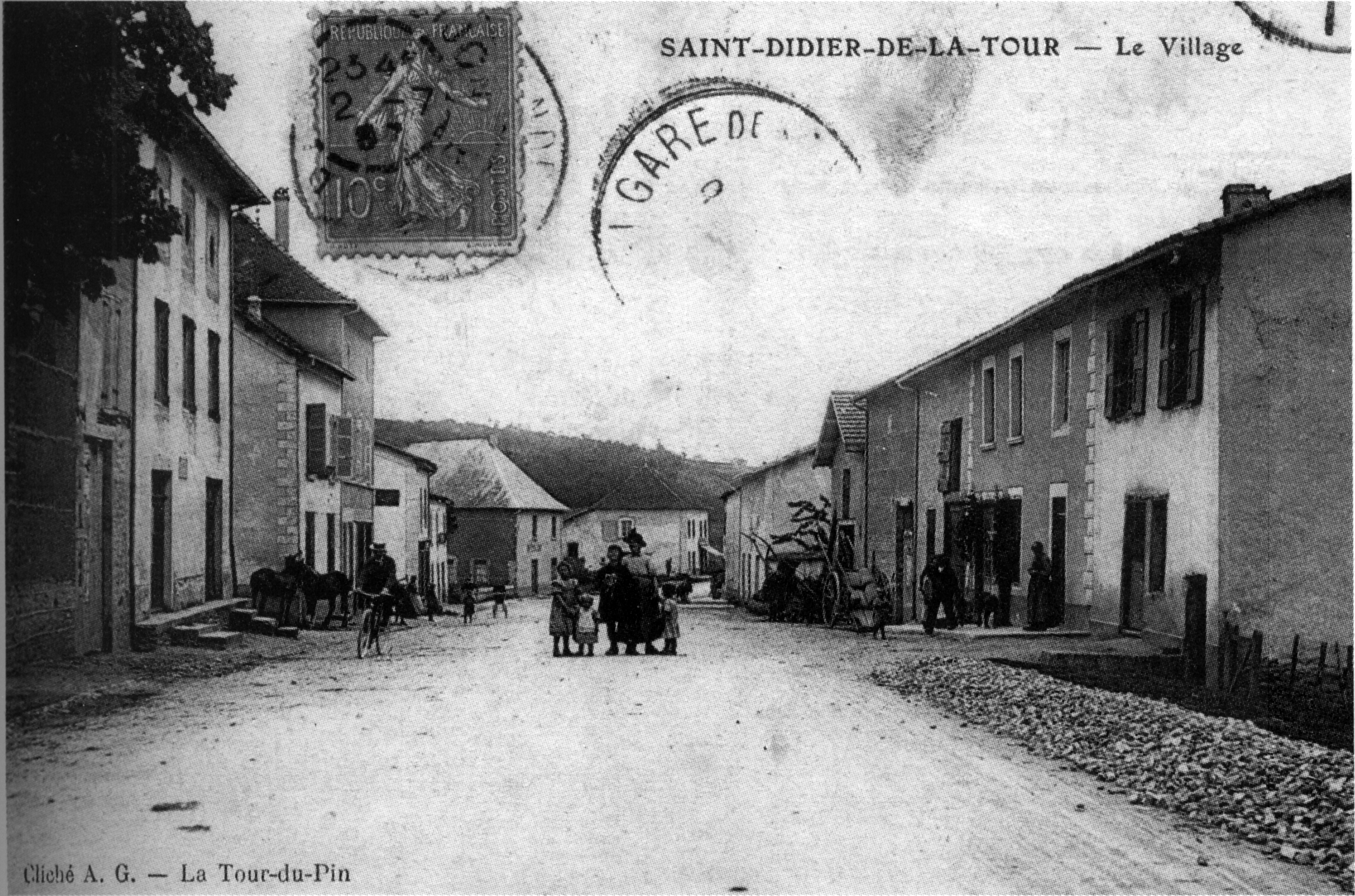
- Saint-Didier-de-la-Tour in 1907
- Location of Saint-Didier-de-la-Tour
- Location within France Location within Auvergne-Rhône-Alpes
- Coordinates: 45°33′20″N 5°29′01″E
- Country: France
- Region: Auvergne-Rhône-Alpes
- Department: Isère
- Arrondissement: La Tour-du-Pin
- Canton: La Tour-du-Pin
- Intercommunality: Les Vals du Dauphiné

Government
  - Mayor (2020–2026): Philippe Guerin
- Area^{1}: 14.63 km^{2} (5.65 sq mi)
- Elevation: 410 m (1,350 ft)
- Highest elevation: 554 m (1,818 ft)
- Lowest elevation: 328 m (1,076 ft)
- Population (2023): 2,143
  - Density: 146.5/km^{2} (379.4/sq mi)
- Time zone: UTC+01:00 (CET)
  - Summer (DST): UTC+02:00 (CEST)
- INSEE/Postal code: 38381 /38110
- ^{1} French Land Register data, which excludes lakes, ponds, glaciers > 1 km^{2} (0.386 sq mi or 247 acres) and river estuaries.

Saint-Didier-de-la-Tour (French pronunciation: [sɛ̃ didje də la tuʁ], literally Saint-Didier of La Tour) is a commune in the Isère department in southeastern France. It is often referred to as "La Cassôla", after a spring in the village, which has heavily coloured waters.

Until the First World War, lignite mines were exploited near the village, employing over 600 people.

== Geography ==
The Bourbre forms part of the commune's northeastern border.

== Population ==
Historical population

Year	Pop.	±% p.a.
1793	886	—
1821	1,063	+0.65%
1846	1,541	+1.50%
1872	1,488	−0.13%
1901	1,148	−0.89%
1926	949	−0.76%
1946	894	−0.30%
1962	925	+0.21%
1968	949	+0.43%

Year	Pop.	±% p.a.
1975	1,116	+2.34%
1982	1,127	+0.14%
1990	1,310	+1.90%
1999	1,419	+0.89%
2007	1,712	+2.37%
2012	1,836	+1.41%
2017	2,045	+2.18%
2023	2,143	+0.78%

Source: EHESS and INSEE (1968-2023)

== See also ==
- Communes of the Isère department
