= Saint-Victor-de-Cessieu =

- Commune
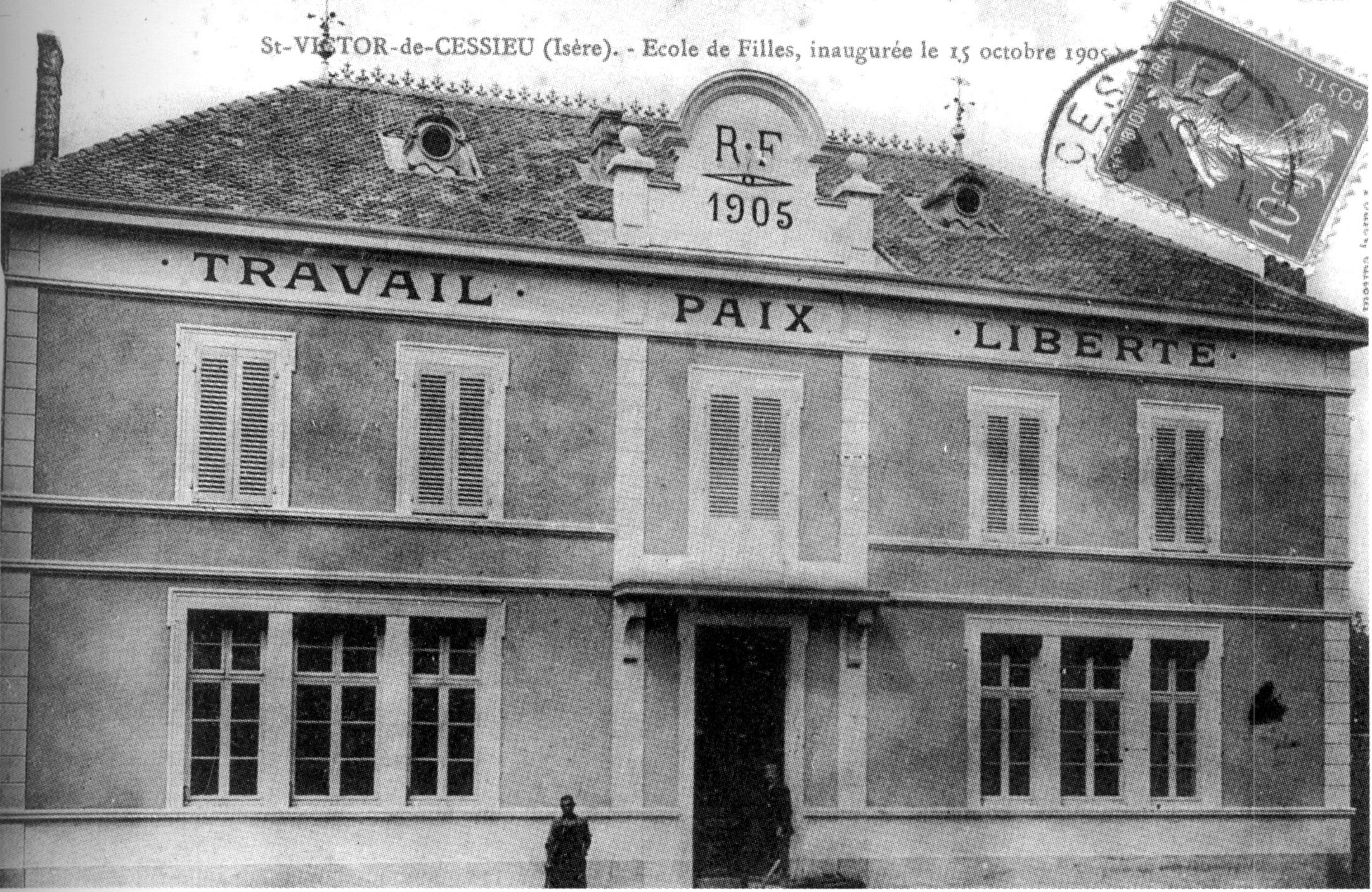
- The girls' school in 1907
- Location of Saint-Victor-de-Cessieu
- Location within France Location within Auvergne-Rhône-Alpes
- Coordinates: 45°32′30″N 5°23′32″E
- Country: France
- Region: Auvergne-Rhône-Alpes
- Department: Isère
- Arrondissement: La Tour-du-Pin
- Canton: La Tour-du-Pin

Government
  - Mayor (2024–2026): Isabelle Fournier
- Area^{1}: 12.22 km^{2} (4.72 sq mi)
- Elevation: 430 m (1,410 ft)
- Highest elevation: 555 m (1,821 ft)
- Lowest elevation: 310 m (1,020 ft)
- Population (2023): 2,148
  - Density: 175.8/km^{2} (455.3/sq mi)
- Time zone: UTC+01:00 (CET)
  - Summer (DST): UTC+02:00 (CEST)
- INSEE/Postal code: 38464 /38110
- ^{1} French Land Register data, which excludes lakes, ponds, glaciers > 1 km^{2} (0.386 sq mi or 247 acres) and river estuaries.

Saint-Victor-de-Cessieu (French pronunciation: [sɛ̃ viktɔʁ də sɛsjø], literally Saint-Victor of Cessieu) is a commune in the Isère department in southeastern France.

== Population ==
Historical population
Year	Pop.	±% p.a.
1968	1,370	—
1975	1,362	−0.08%
1982	1,340	−0.23%
1990	1,565	+1.96%
1999	1,669	+0.72%
2007	2,069	+2.72%
2012	2,177	+1.02%
2017	2,240	+0.57%
2023	2,148	−0.70%
Source: INSEE

== See also ==
- Communes of the Isère department
