= Montagnieu =

Montagnieu may refer to:

- Montagnieu, Ain
- Montagnieu, Isère
