= Burçin =

Burçin is a feminine Turkish given name. In Turkish, it means "female deer" or "doe", and is used to evoke grace, elegance, and natural beauty, often associated with the characteristics of a deer in Turkish culture.

== People ==
=== Given name ===
- Burçin Neziroğlu (born 1993), Turkish rhythmic gymnast
- Burçin Terzioğlu (born 1980), Turkish actress
- Burçin Mutlu-Pakdil, Turkish astrophysicist
- Burçin Abdullah, Turkish actress

== Other uses ==
- Burçin Hatun, fictional character in Turkish TV series Kuruluş: Osman

== See also ==
- Burcin
- Ivan Burtchin, Bulgarian sprint canoer
