= La Chapelle-de-la-Tour =

Chapelle-de-la-Tour
- Commune
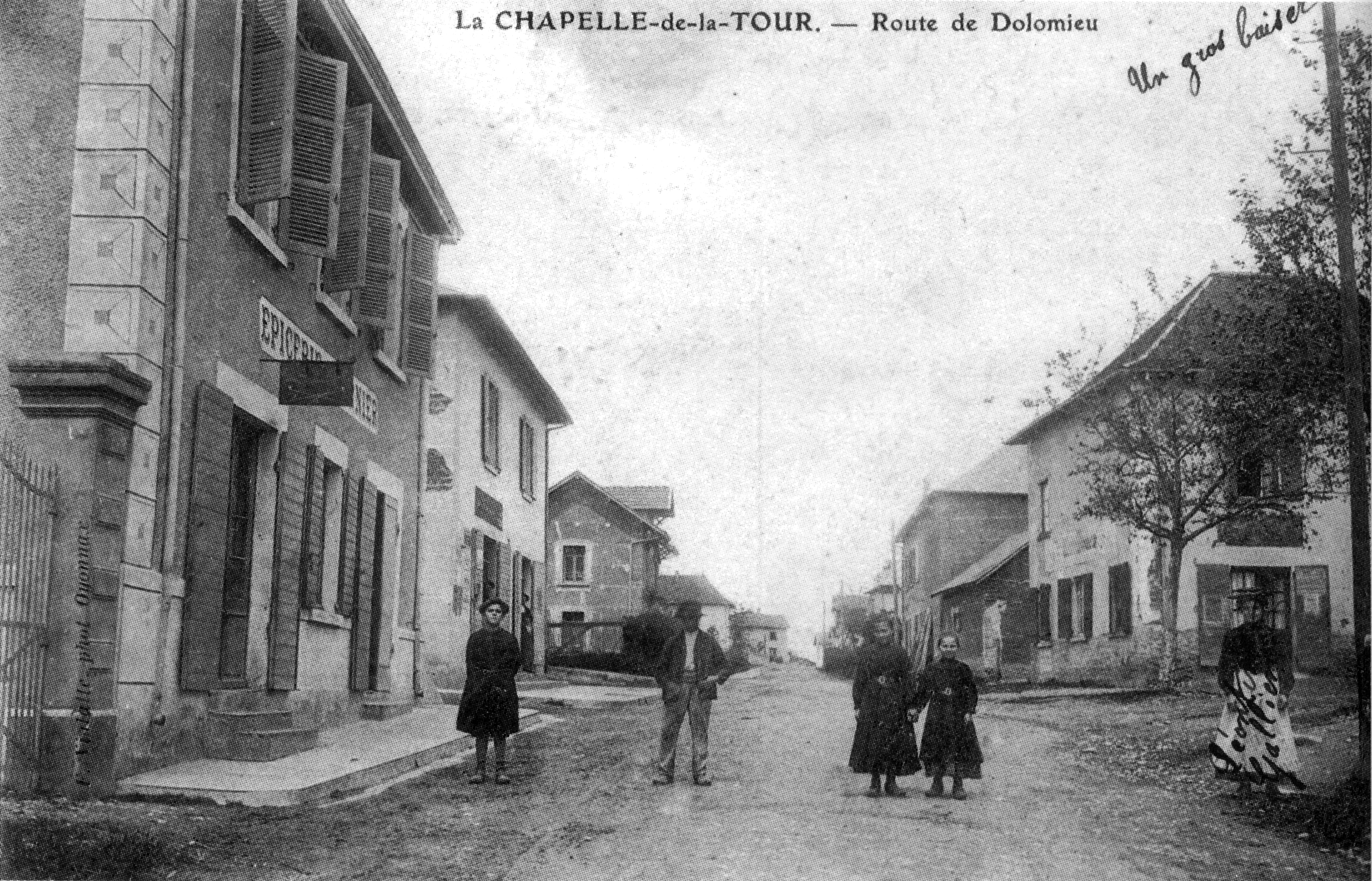
- The route de Dolomieu in 1912
- Location of Chapelle-de-la-Tour
- Location within France Location within Auvergne-Rhône-Alpes
- Coordinates: 45°36′N 5°28′E
- Country: France
- Region: Auvergne-Rhône-Alpes
- Department: Isère
- Arrondissement: La Tour-du-Pin
- Canton: La Tour-du-Pin

Government
  - Mayor (2022–2026): Thérèse Tisserand
- Area^{1}: 9.04 km^{2} (3.49 sq mi)
- Highest elevation: 452 m (1,483 ft)
- Lowest elevation: 375 m (1,230 ft)
- Population (2023): 1,992
  - Density: 220/km^{2} (571/sq mi)
- Time zone: UTC+01:00 (CET)
  - Summer (DST): UTC+02:00 (CEST)
- INSEE/Postal code: 38076 /38110
- ^{1} French Land Register data, which excludes lakes, ponds, glaciers > 1 km^{2} (0.386 sq mi or 247 acres) and river estuaries.

La Chapelle-de-la-Tour (French pronunciation: [la ʃapɛl də la tuʁ], literally The Chapel of La Tour) is a commune in the Isère department in southeastern France.

== Population ==
Historical population
Year	Pop.	±% p.a.
1968	725	—
1975	811	+1.61%
1982	1,044	+3.67%
1990	1,295	+2.73%
1999	1,384	+0.74%
2007	1,598	+1.81%
2012	1,700	+1.25%
2017	1,807	+1.23%
2023	1,992	+1.64%
Source: INSEE

== See also ==
- Communes of the Isère department
