= Saint-Clair-de-la-Tour =

- Commune
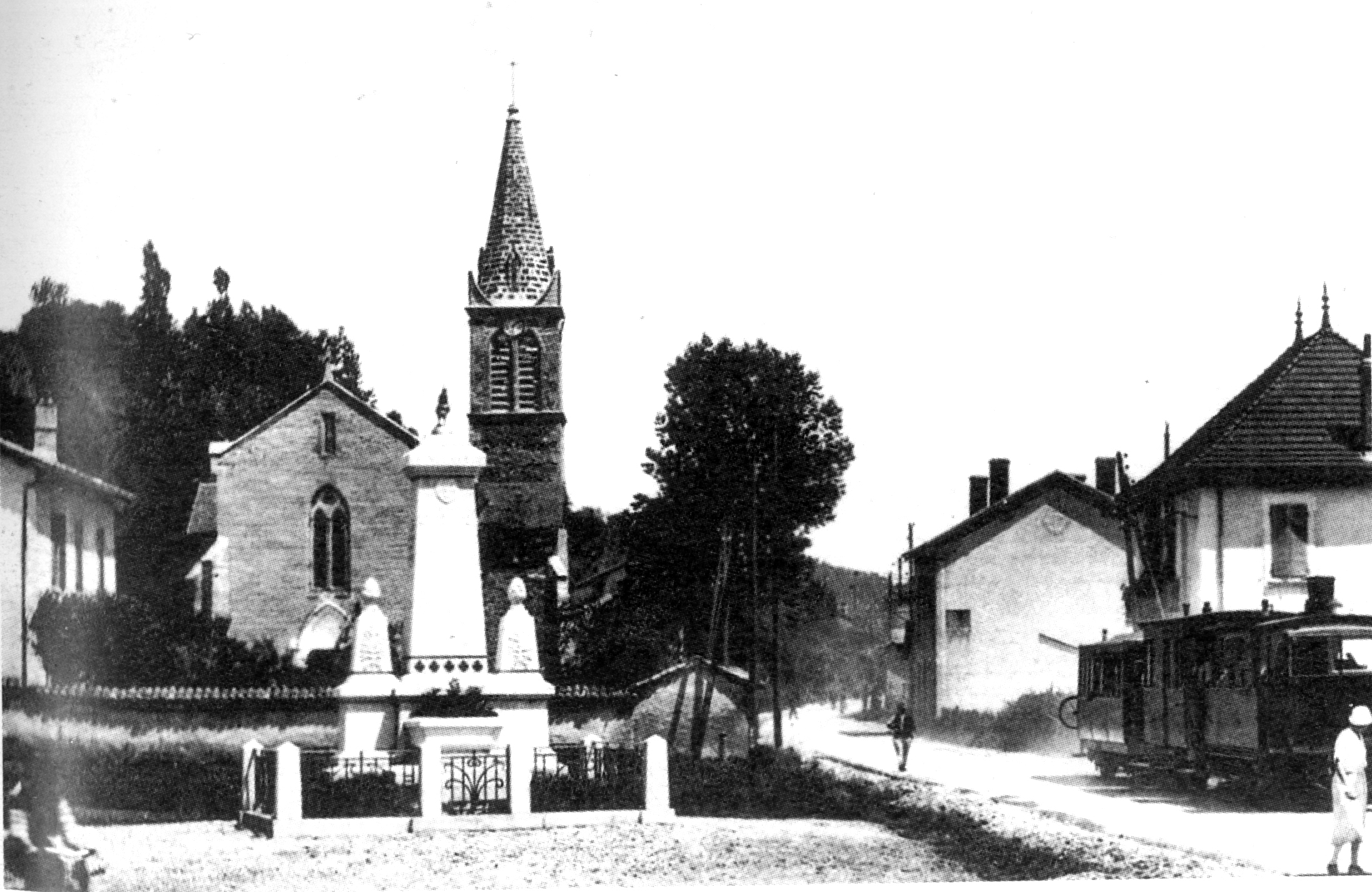
- Saint-Clair-de-la-Tour around 1925
- Location of Saint-Clair-de-la-Tour
- Location within France Location within Auvergne-Rhône-Alpes
- Coordinates: 45°34′29″N 5°28′57″E
- Country: France
- Region: Auvergne-Rhône-Alpes
- Department: Isère
- Arrondissement: La Tour-du-Pin
- Canton: La Tour-du-Pin
- Intercommunality: Les Vals du Dauphiné

Government
  - Mayor (2020–2026): Patrick Blandin
- Area^{1}: 9.24 km^{2} (3.57 sq mi)
- Elevation: 340 m (1,120 ft)
- Highest elevation: 425 m (1,394 ft)
- Lowest elevation: 314 m (1,030 ft)
- Population (2023): 3,628
  - Density: 393/km^{2} (1,020/sq mi)
- Time zone: UTC+01:00 (CET)
  - Summer (DST): UTC+02:00 (CEST)
- INSEE/Postal code: 38377 /38110
- ^{1} French Land Register data, which excludes lakes, ponds, glaciers > 1 km^{2} (0.386 sq mi or 247 acres) and river estuaries.

Saint-Clair-de-la-Tour (French pronunciation: [sɛ̃ klɛːʁ də la tuʁ]; literally 'Saint-Clair of La Tour') is a commune in the Isère department in southeastern France.

== Geography ==
The Bourbre flows west through the middle of the commune and crosses the village.

== Population ==
Historical population

Year	Pop.	±% p.a.
1793	601	—
1821	916	+1.52%
1846	1,012	+0.40%
1872	1,100	+0.32%
1901	1,332	+0.66%
1926	1,942	+1.52%
1946	1,759	−0.49%
1962	1,996	+0.79%
1968	1,808	−1.64%

Year	Pop.	±% p.a.
1975	2,244	+3.13%
1982	2,758	+2.99%
1990	2,565	−0.90%
1999	2,677	+0.48%
2007	3,125	+1.95%
2012	3,359	+1.45%
2017	3,424	+0.38%
2023	3,628	+0.97%

Source: EHESS and INSEE (1968-2023)

== See also ==
- Communes of the Isère department
