= Sainte-Blandine, Isère =

Sainte-Blandine
- Commune
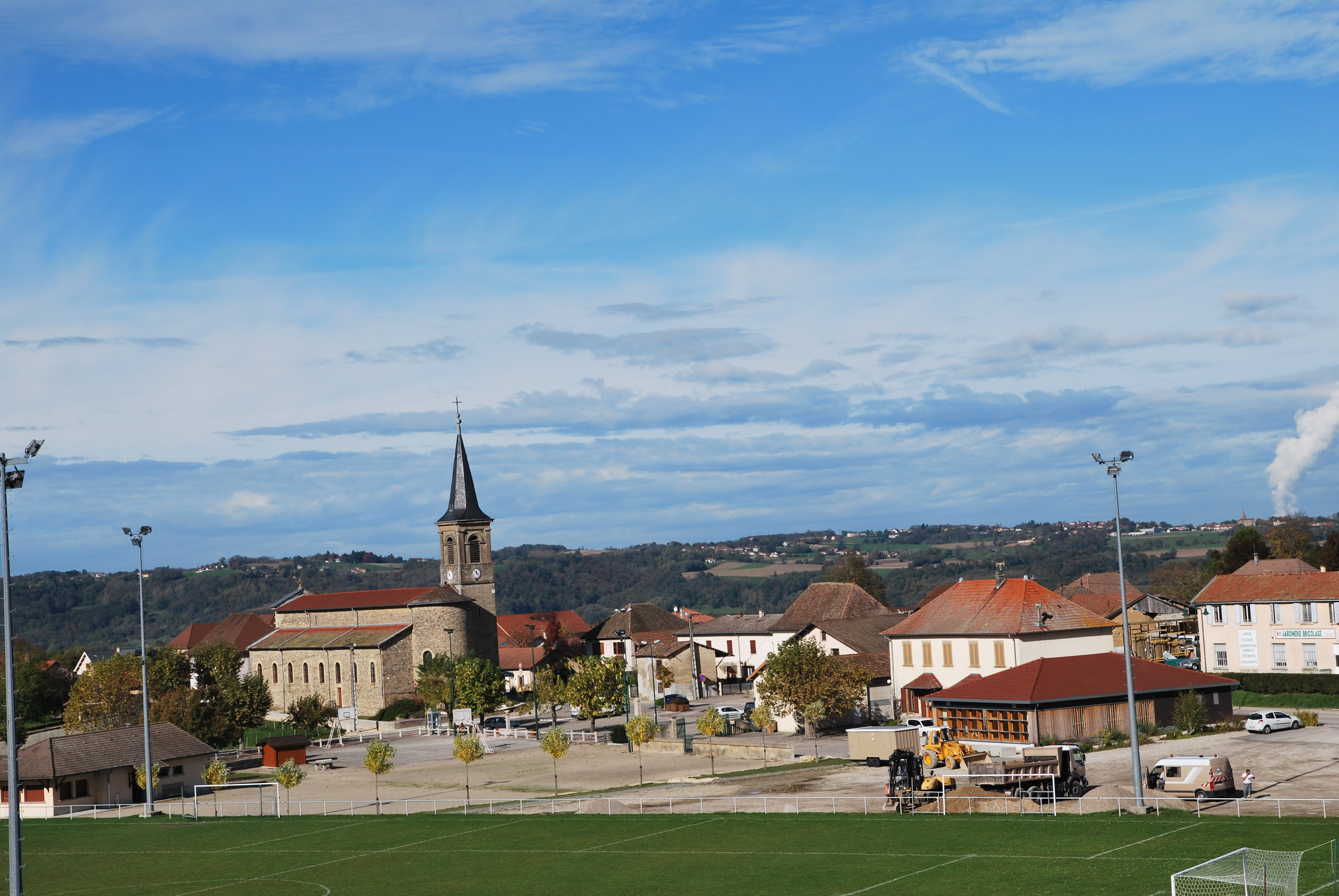
- The village centre of Sainte-Blandine
- Location of Sainte-Blandine
- Location within France Location within Auvergne-Rhône-Alpes
- Coordinates: 45°32′51″N 5°26′28″E
- Country: France
- Region: Auvergne-Rhône-Alpes
- Department: Isère
- Arrondissement: La Tour-du-Pin
- Canton: La Tour-du-Pin

Government
  - Mayor (2020–2026): Jacques Garnier
- Area^{1}: 9.21 km^{2} (3.56 sq mi)
- Highest elevation: 493 m (1,617 ft)
- Lowest elevation: 328 m (1,076 ft)
- Population (2023): 1,039
  - Density: 113/km^{2} (292/sq mi)
- Time zone: UTC+01:00 (CET)
  - Summer (DST): UTC+02:00 (CEST)
- INSEE/Postal code: 38369 /38110
- ^{1} French Land Register data, which excludes lakes, ponds, glaciers > 1 km^{2} (0.386 sq mi or 247 acres) and river estuaries.

Sainte-Blandine (French pronunciation: [sɛ̃t blɑ̃din]) is a commune in the Isère department in southeastern France.

== Population ==
Historical population
Year	Pop.	±% p.a.
1968	491	—
1975	482	−0.26%
1982	666	+4.73%
1990	747	+1.45%
1999	764	+0.25%
2007	910	+2.21%
2012	918	+0.18%
2017	977	+1.25%
2023	1,039	+1.03%
Source: INSEE

== See also ==
- Communes of the Isère department
