= Le Passage, Isère =

Commune in Auvergne-Rhône-Alpes, France

Le Passage
- Commune
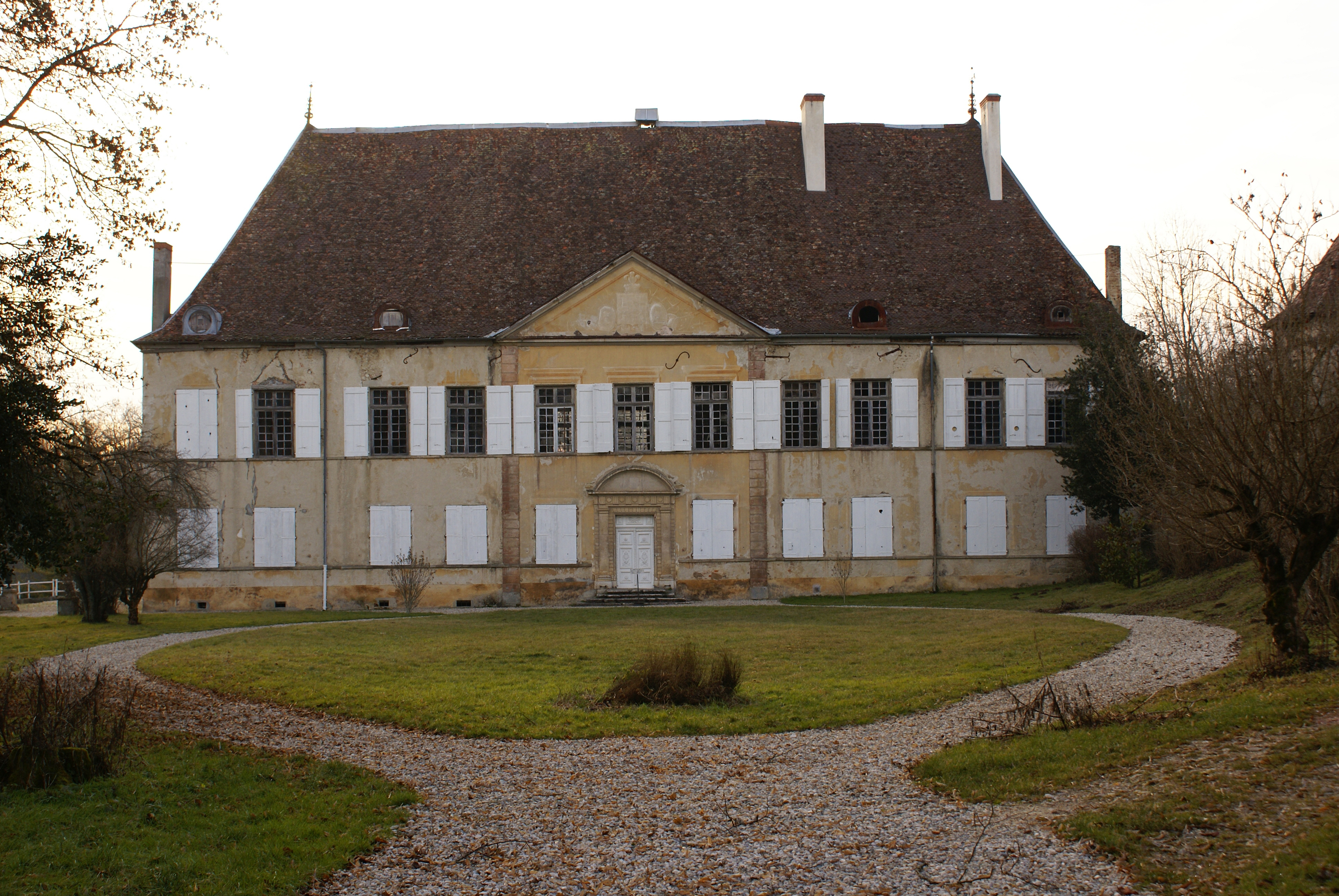
- Chateau
- Location of Le Passage
- Location within France Location within Auvergne-Rhône-Alpes
- Coordinates: 45°32′00″N 5°30′46″E
- Country: France
- Region: Auvergne-Rhône-Alpes
- Department: Isère
- Arrondissement: La Tour-du-Pin
- Canton: La Tour-du-Pin

Government
  - Mayor (2020–2026): Laurent Michel
- Area^{1}: 6.68 km^{2} (2.58 sq mi)
- Elevation: 471 m (1,545 ft)
- Highest elevation: 521 m (1,709 ft)
- Lowest elevation: 365 m (1,198 ft)
- Population (2023): 983
  - Density: 147/km^{2} (381/sq mi)
- Time zone: UTC+01:00 (CET)
  - Summer (DST): UTC+02:00 (CEST)
- INSEE/Postal code: 38296 /38490
- ^{1} French Land Register data, which excludes lakes, ponds, glaciers > 1 km^{2} (0.386 sq mi or 247 acres) and river estuaries.

Le Passage (French pronunciation: [lə pasaʒ]) is a commune in the Isère department in southeastern France.

== Geography ==
The Bourbre forms the commune's southeastern border.

== Population ==
Historical population
Year	Pop.	±% p.a.
1968	343	—
1975	339	−0.17%
1982	431	+3.49%
1990	516	+2.28%
1999	648	+2.56%
2007	750	+1.84%
2012	780	+0.79%
2017	793	+0.33%
2023	983	+3.64%
Source: INSEE

== See also ==
- Communes of the Isère department
