= Torchefelon =

- Commune
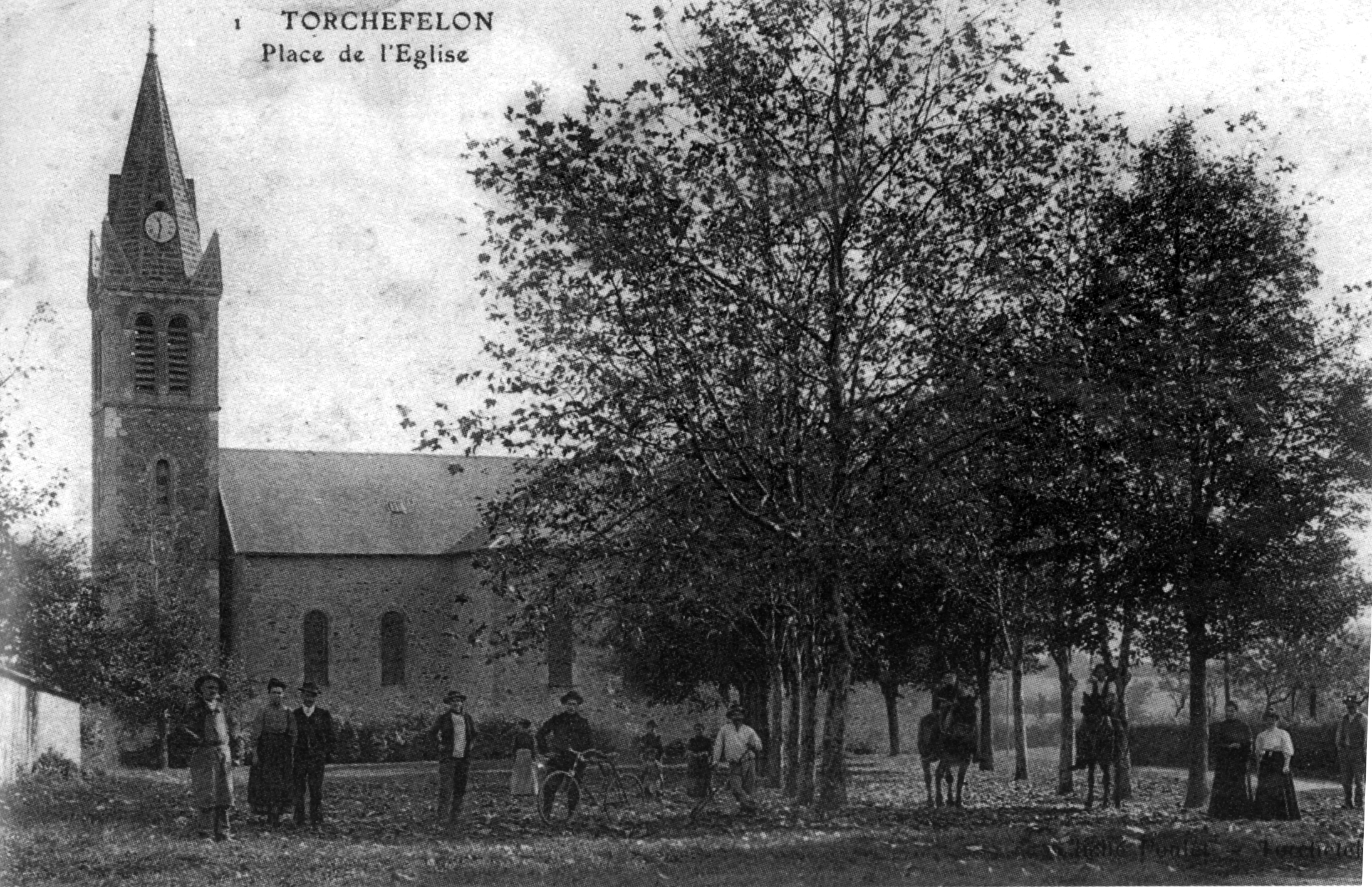
- Torchefelon in 1912
- Location of Torchefelon
- Location within France Location within Auvergne-Rhône-Alpes
- Coordinates: 45°31′16″N 5°24′03″E
- Country: France
- Region: Auvergne-Rhône-Alpes
- Department: Isère
- Arrondissement: La Tour-du-Pin
- Canton: La Tour-du-Pin

Government
  - Mayor (2020–2026): Bernard Badin
- Area^{1}: 8.68 km^{2} (3.35 sq mi)
- Elevation: 540 m (1,770 ft)
- Highest elevation: 589 m (1,932 ft)
- Lowest elevation: 378 m (1,240 ft)
- Population (2023): 838
  - Density: 96.5/km^{2} (250/sq mi)
- Time zone: UTC+01:00 (CET)
  - Summer (DST): UTC+02:00 (CEST)
- INSEE/Postal code: 38508 /38690
- ^{1} French Land Register data, which excludes lakes, ponds, glaciers > 1 km^{2} (0.386 sq mi or 247 acres) and river estuaries.

Torchefelon (French pronunciation: [tɔʁʃəfəlɔ̃]) is a commune in the Isère department in southeastern France.

== History ==
Torchefelon is in what was the ancient territory of the Allobroges, a group of Gallic tribes occupying the former Savoy, as well as the part of Dauphiné, located north of the river Isère.

The castle of Ponteray once stood in the town, but it was burned by Thibaud de Rougemont the Archbishop of Vienne and there are no remains.

The mayor is Bernard Badin, elected in 2020.

== Climate ==
There is a kind of micro-climate, in the town of Torchefelon generally as a colder climate than the plain of Bourgoin. It is therefore not uncommon in winter to find snow in the sector of this town while the rest of Nord-Isère is devoid of it.

== Hydrology ==
The commune is bordered in its eastern part by the Hien stream, a tributary of the Bourbre and with a length of 17.2 km4 and in the western part by the stream of the mills, with a length of 5 km.

== Notable people ==
- Guillaume Quérenet de La Combe (1731-1788), born in Torchefelon, colonel, engineer of the Royal Corps of Engineers, knight of the royal and military order of Saint-Louis. At the head of the engineers of the French expeditionary force, his work enabled the victory of Yorktown (September 28, 1781) and the capitulation of the British troops of Cornwallis, a decisive victory which will lead directly to the Treaty of Versailles (1783) and to American independence. In this capacity, he was an original member of the Society of the Cincinnati. Former student (class of 1751) of the Royal Engineering School of Mézières.
- Jean de Torchefelon, marshal of Dauphiné, fought at Agincourt. Famous for his disputes with the Archbishop of Vienne, Thibaud de Rougemont.

== Places and monuments ==
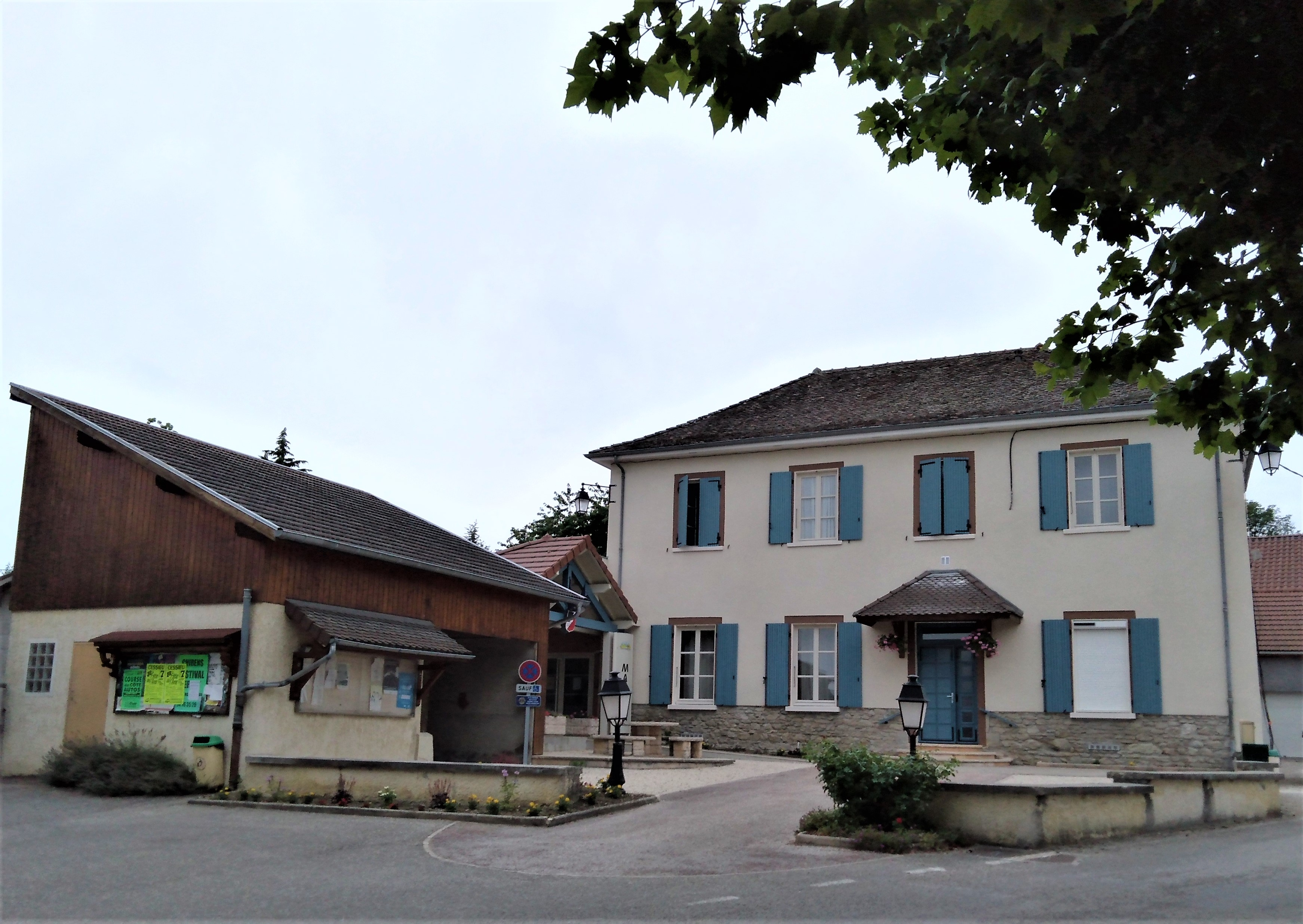
Mairie de Torchefelon.

- The remains of the Château de Ponteray
- The fortified house of La Murette, 16th century
- The fortified house of Saint-Roch, 16th century
- The fortified house of Saint-Georges-du-Mont, from the 15th century, property of the Querrenet family in the 18th century.
- The village church.
- The chapel of Saint-Georges de Montagnieu
- The chapel of Saint-Roch
- The remains of the old forge
- The dauphinoise house of La Rougière

== Population ==
Historical population
Year	Pop.	±% p.a.
1968	348	—
1975	311	−1.59%
1982	346	+1.54%
1990	390	+1.51%
1999	449	+1.58%
2007	566	+2.94%
2012	659	+3.09%
2017	739	+2.32%
2023	838	+2.12%
Source: INSEE

== See also ==
- Communes of the Isère department
