= La Tour-du-Pin station =

Railway station in Isère, France

La Tour-du-Pin
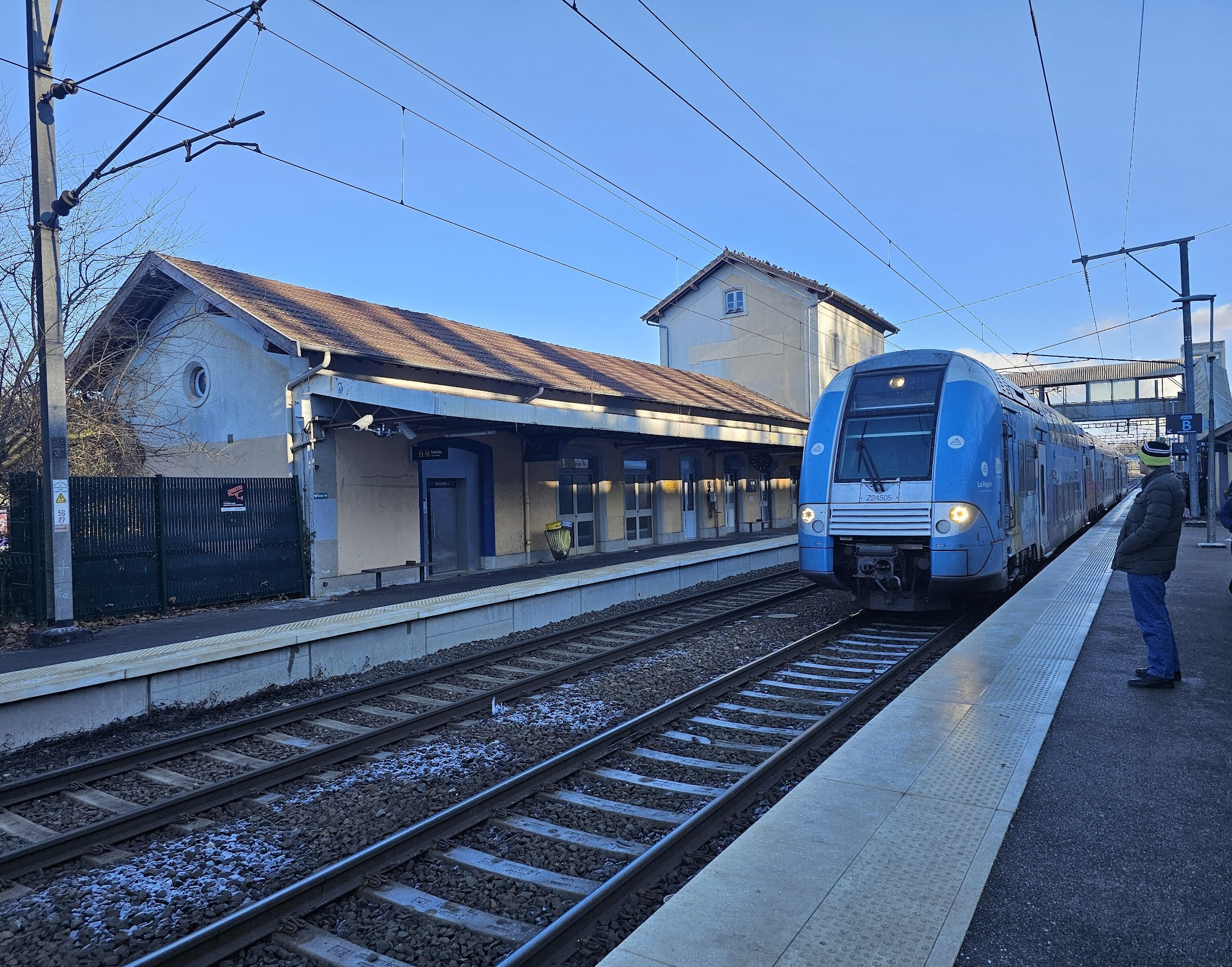
- A Lyon-bound train arrives at La Tour-du-Pin station

General information
- Location: 2 Place de la Gare, La Tour-du-Pin, Isère, Auvergne-Rhône-Alpes; France
- Coordinates: 45°33′36″N 5°27′00″E
- Elevation: 339 m (1,112 ft)
- Owner: SNCF
- Operator: SNCF
- Line: Lyon–Marseille (via Grenoble) railway
- Platforms: 2
- Tracks: 2
- Train operators: TER Auvergne-Rhône-Alpes

Other information
- Station code: 87723478

History
- Opened: 22 August 1861

Passengers
- 2024: 1,057,716

Services
Preceding station	TER Auvergne-Rhône-Alpes	Following station
Cessieu towards Lyon-Perrache	1	Saint-André-le-Gaz Terminus
Bourgoin-Jallieu towards Lyon-Part-Dieu	1	Voiron towards Grenoble
Bourgoin-Jallieu towards Lyon-Part-Dieu	54	Pont-de-Beauvoisin towards Chambéry
Location

La Tour-du-Pin station (French: Gare de La Tour-du-Pin) is a railway station in the Isère département of France in the southeastern French region of Auvergne-Rhône-Alpes. The station, located approximately 51 km to the south-east of Lyon (Lyon-Part-Dieu station), serves the commune of La Tour-du-Pin, and is situated around 500 m to the south-east of the town center.

The station has two side platforms connected by a pedestrian overpass. There is a parking lot near the station and a passenger drop-off area in front of the station building located to the north of the tracks.

The local buses to Les Avenières and Morestel also stop at the station square.

== History ==
The station was opened on August 22, 1861 by the Compagnie des chemins de fer de Paris à Lyon et à la Méditerranée (PLM), when it opened the Bourgoin to Saint-André-le-Gaz section of the Lyon to Grenoble line to operation.

== Train services ==
The station is served by the following regional services, all operated by TER Auvergne-Rhône-Alpes:

- Between Lyon-Part-Dieu and Chambéry
- Between Lyon-Part-Dieu and Grenoble
- Between Lyon-Perrache and Saint-André-le-Gaz.
