= Canton of La Tour-du-Pin =

Coordinates: 45.57°N 5.44°E

The canton of La Tour-du-Pin is an administrative division of the Isère department, eastern France. Its borders were modified at the French canton reorganisation which came into effect in March 2015. Its seat is in La Tour-du-Pin.

It consists of the following communes:

1. La Bâtie-Montgascon
2. Cessieu
3. La Chapelle-de-la-Tour
4. Dolomieu
5. Faverges-de-la-Tour
6. Montagnieu
7. Montcarra
8. Le Passage
9. Rochetoirin
10. Saint-André-le-Gaz
11. Saint-Clair-de-la-Tour
12. Saint-Didier-de-la-Tour
13. Sainte-Blandine
14. Saint-Jean-de-Soudain
15. Saint-Victor-de-Cessieu
16. Torchefelon
17. La Tour-du-Pin
