= Saint-Jean-de-Soudain =

- Commune
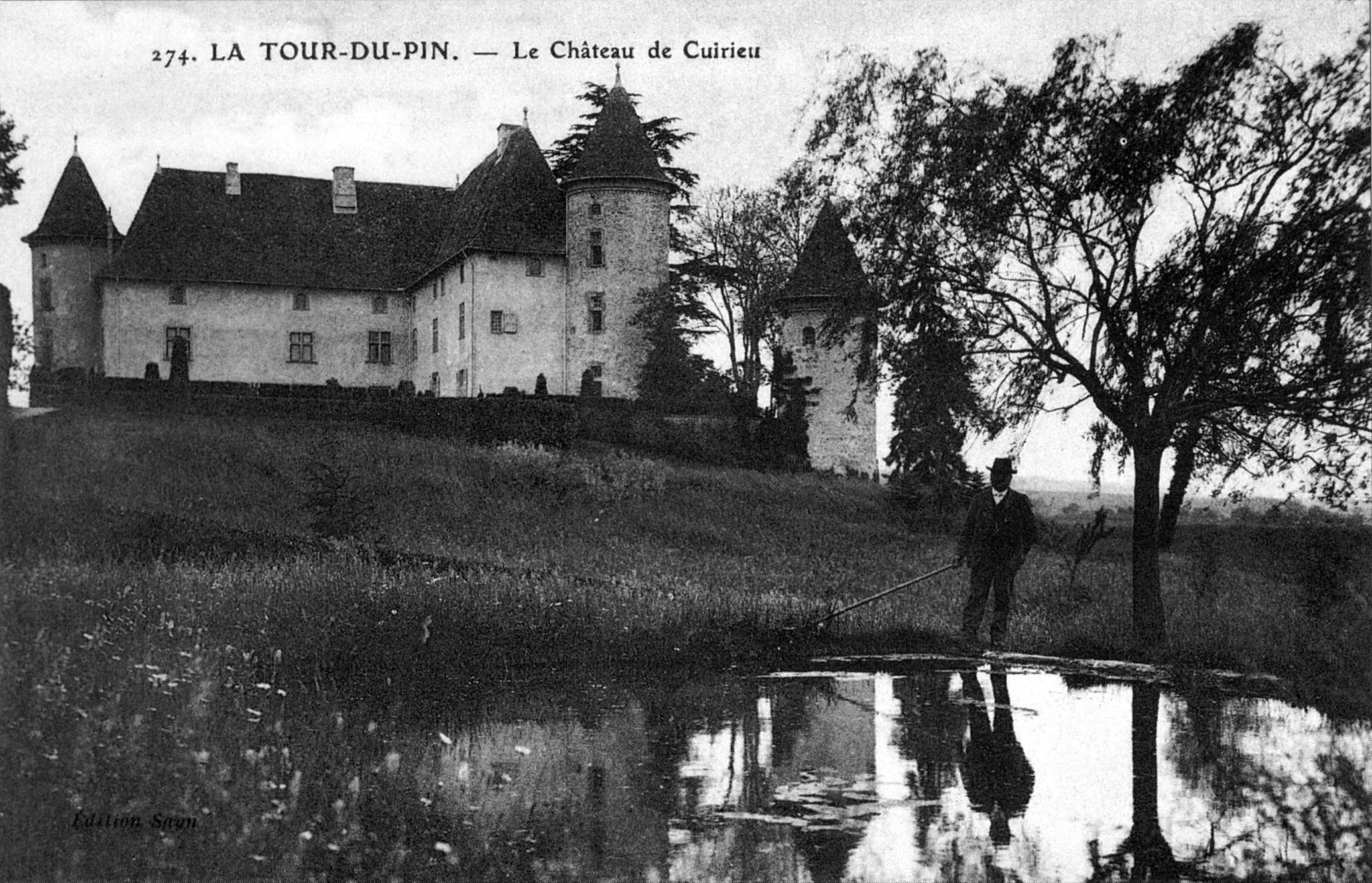
- The château of Cuirieu in the early 20th century

- Coat of arms
- Location of Saint-Jean-de-Soudain
- Location within France Location within Auvergne-Rhône-Alpes
- Coordinates: 45°34′24″N 5°25′47″E
- Country: France
- Region: Auvergne-Rhône-Alpes
- Department: Isère
- Arrondissement: La Tour-du-Pin
- Canton: La Tour-du-Pin
- Intercommunality: Les Vals du Dauphiné

Government
  - Mayor (2020–2026): Alain Courbou
- Area^{1}: 7.48 km^{2} (2.89 sq mi)
- Elevation: 389 m (1,276 ft)
- Highest elevation: 471 m (1,545 ft)
- Lowest elevation: 303 m (994 ft)
- Population (2023): 1,714
  - Density: 229/km^{2} (593/sq mi)
- Time zone: UTC+01:00 (CET)
  - Summer (DST): UTC+02:00 (CEST)
- INSEE/Postal code: 38401 /38110
- ^{1} French Land Register data, which excludes lakes, ponds, glaciers > 1 km^{2} (0.386 sq mi or 247 acres) and river estuaries.

Saint-Jean-de-Soudain (French pronunciation: [sɛ̃ ʒɑ̃ də sudɛ̃]) is a commune in the Isère department in southeastern France.

== Geography ==
The Bourbre flows west through the middle of the commune and crosses the village.

== Population ==
Historical population
Year	Pop.	±% p.a.
1968	652	—
1975	735	+1.73%
1982	839	+1.91%
1990	934	+1.35%
1999	980	+0.54%
2007	1,349	+4.08%
2012	1,493	+2.05%
2017	1,585	+1.20%
2023	1,714	+1.31%
Source: INSEE

== See also ==
- Communes of the Isère department
