= Saint-André-le-Gaz =

- Commune
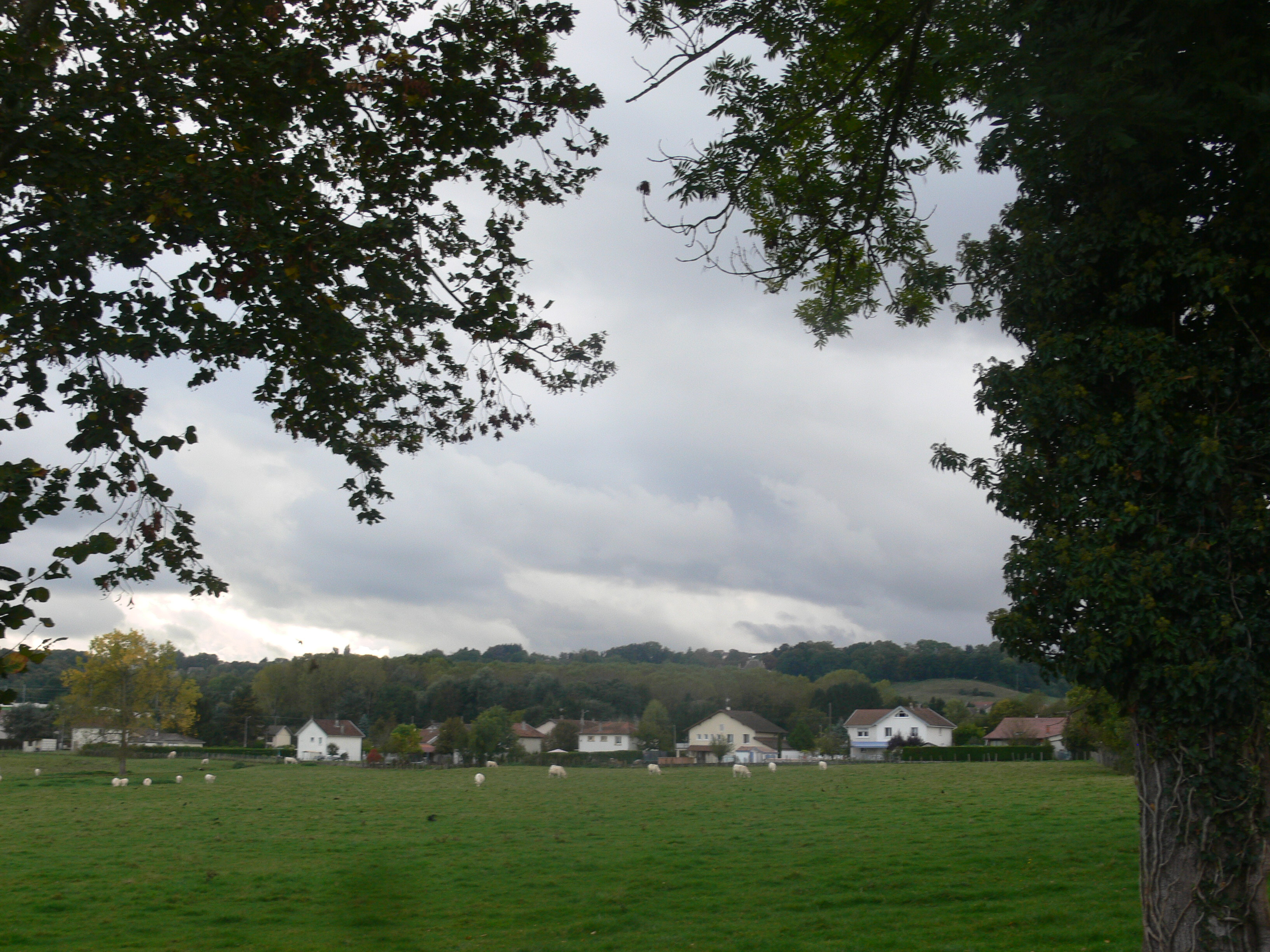
- A general view of Saint-André-le-Gaz
- Location of Saint-André-le-Gaz
- Location within France Location within Auvergne-Rhône-Alpes
- Coordinates: 45°32′59″N 5°32′06″E
- Country: France
- Region: Auvergne-Rhône-Alpes
- Department: Isère
- Arrondissement: La Tour-du-Pin
- Canton: La Tour-du-Pin

Government
  - Mayor (2020–2026): Magali Guillot
- Area^{1}: 8.89 km^{2} (3.43 sq mi)
- Elevation: 409 m (1,342 ft)
- Highest elevation: 488 m (1,601 ft)
- Lowest elevation: 356 m (1,168 ft)
- Population (2023): 2,754
  - Density: 310/km^{2} (802/sq mi)
- Time zone: UTC+01:00 (CET)
  - Summer (DST): UTC+02:00 (CEST)
- INSEE/Postal code: 38357 /38490
- ^{1} French Land Register data, which excludes lakes, ponds, glaciers > 1 km^{2} (0.386 sq mi or 247 acres) and river estuaries.

Saint-André-le-Gaz (French pronunciation: [sɛ̃.t‿ɑ̃dʁe lə ɡaz]) is a commune in the Isère department in southeastern France.

== Geography ==
The Bourbre forms the commune's eastern border. Saint-André-le-Gaz station has rail connections to Lyon, Grenoble and Chambéry.

== Population ==
Historical population

Year	Pop.	±% p.a.
1793	906	—
1821	970	+0.24%
1846	1,379	+1.42%
1872	1,370	−0.03%
1901	1,334	−0.09%
1926	1,310	−0.07%
1946	1,160	−0.61%
1962	1,311	+0.77%
1968	1,406	+1.17%

Year	Pop.	±% p.a.
1975	1,526	+1.18%
1982	1,641	+1.04%
1990	1,903	+1.87%
1999	1,961	+0.33%
2007	2,327	+2.16%
2012	2,605	+2.28%
2017	2,793	+1.40%
2023	2,754	−0.23%

Source: EHESS and INSEE (1968-2023)

== See also ==
- Communes of the Isère department
