= Faverges-de-la-Tour =

- Commune
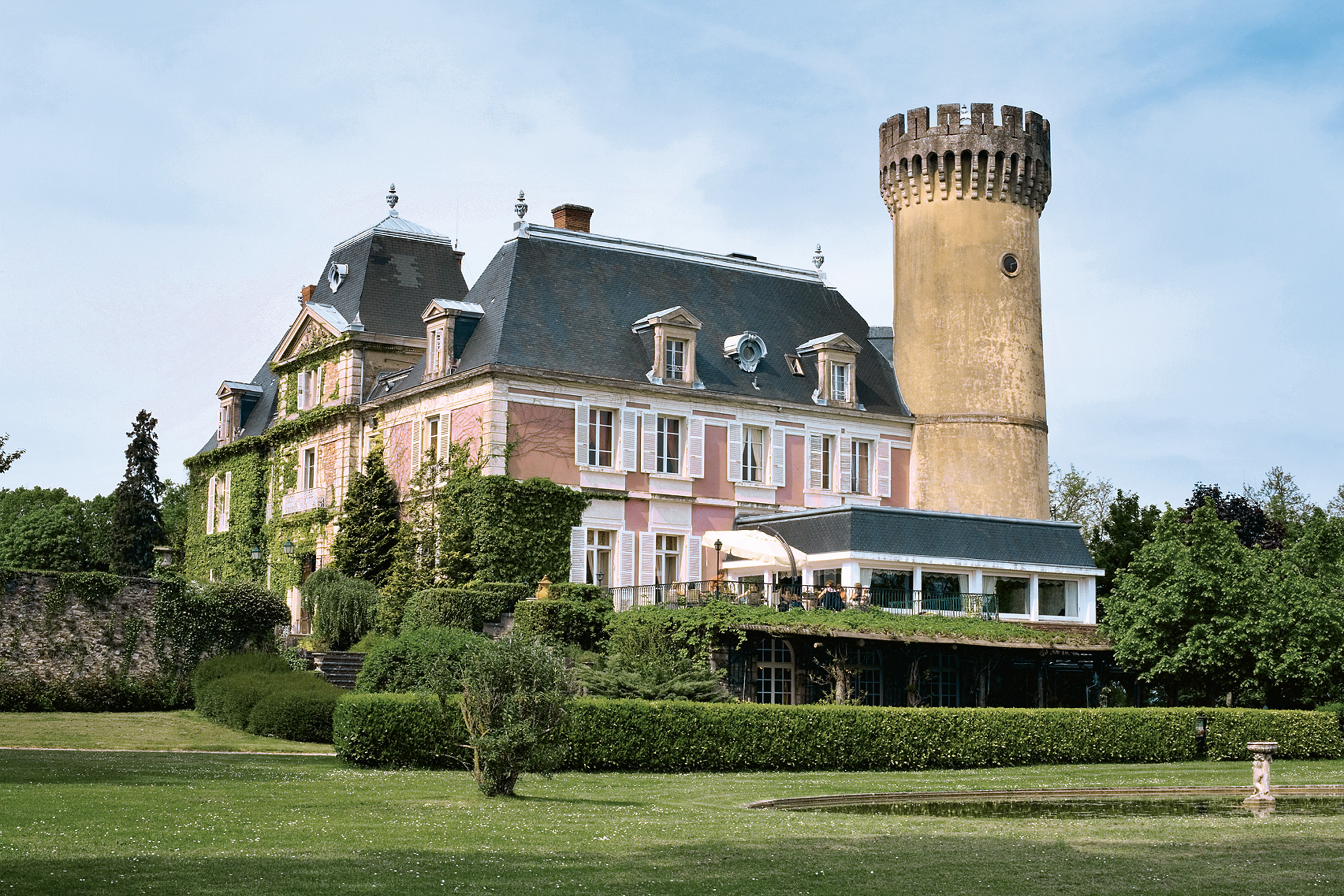
- The Château of Faverges-de-la-Tour
- Location of Faverges-de-la-Tour
- Location within France Location within Auvergne-Rhône-Alpes
- Coordinates: 45°35′31″N 5°31′28″E
- Country: France
- Region: Auvergne-Rhône-Alpes
- Department: Isère
- Arrondissement: La Tour-du-Pin
- Canton: La Tour-du-Pin
- Intercommunality: Les Vals du Dauphiné

Government
  - Mayor (2020–2026): Jean-Marc Damais
- Area^{1}: 7.67 km^{2} (2.96 sq mi)
- Elevation: 394 m (1,293 ft)
- Highest elevation: 432 m (1,417 ft)
- Lowest elevation: 285 m (935 ft)
- Population (2023): 1,487
  - Density: 194/km^{2} (502/sq mi)
- Time zone: UTC+01:00 (CET)
  - Summer (DST): UTC+02:00 (CEST)
- INSEE/Postal code: 38162 /38110
- ^{1} French Land Register data, which excludes lakes, ponds, glaciers > 1 km^{2} (0.386 sq mi or 247 acres) and river estuaries.

Faverges-de-la-Tour (French pronunciation: [favɛʁʒ də la tuʁ], literally Faverges of La Tour) is a commune in the Isère department in southeastern France.

== Population ==
Historical population
Year	Pop.	±% p.a.
1968	675	—
1975	731	+1.15%
1982	818	+1.62%
1990	1,000	+2.54%
1999	1,107	+1.14%
2007	1,287	+1.90%
2012	1,252	−0.55%
2017	1,445	+2.91%
2023	1,487	+0.48%
Source: INSEE

== See also ==
- Communes of the Isère department
