= Montcarra =

- Commune
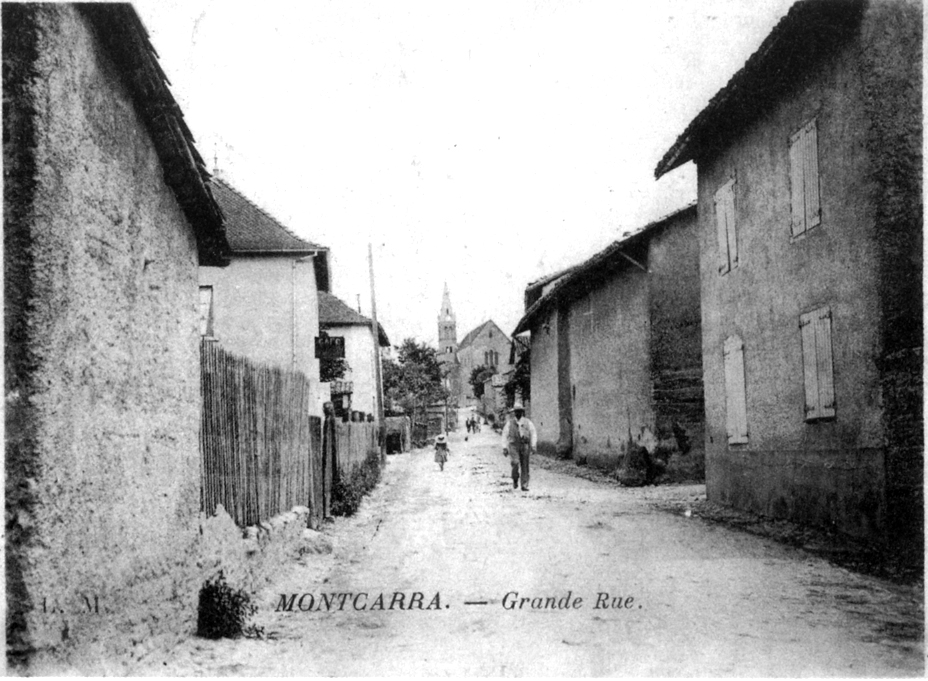
- The main road in 1910
- Location of Montcarra
- Location within France Location within Auvergne-Rhône-Alpes
- Coordinates: 45°36′50″N 5°23′31″E
- Country: France
- Region: Auvergne-Rhône-Alpes
- Department: Isère
- Arrondissement: La Tour-du-Pin
- Canton: La Tour-du-Pin

Government
  - Mayor (2020–2026): David Emeraud
- Area^{1}: 4.9 km^{2} (1.9 sq mi)
- Highest elevation: 452 m (1,483 ft)
- Lowest elevation: 309 m (1,014 ft)
- Population (2023): 612
  - Density: 120/km^{2} (320/sq mi)
- Time zone: UTC+01:00 (CET)
  - Summer (DST): UTC+02:00 (CEST)
- INSEE/Postal code: 38250 /38890
- ^{1} French Land Register data, which excludes lakes, ponds, glaciers > 1 km^{2} (0.386 sq mi or 247 acres) and river estuaries.

Montcarra (French pronunciation: [mɔ̃kaʁa]) is a commune in the Isère department in southeastern France.

== Population ==
Historical population
Year	Pop.	±% p.a.
1968	179	—
1975	189	+0.78%
1982	233	+3.04%
1990	288	+2.68%
1999	351	+2.22%
2007	446	+3.04%
2012	495	+2.11%
2017	532	+1.45%
2023	612	+2.36%
Source: INSEE

== See also ==
- Communes of the Isère department
