= Burcin =

- Commune
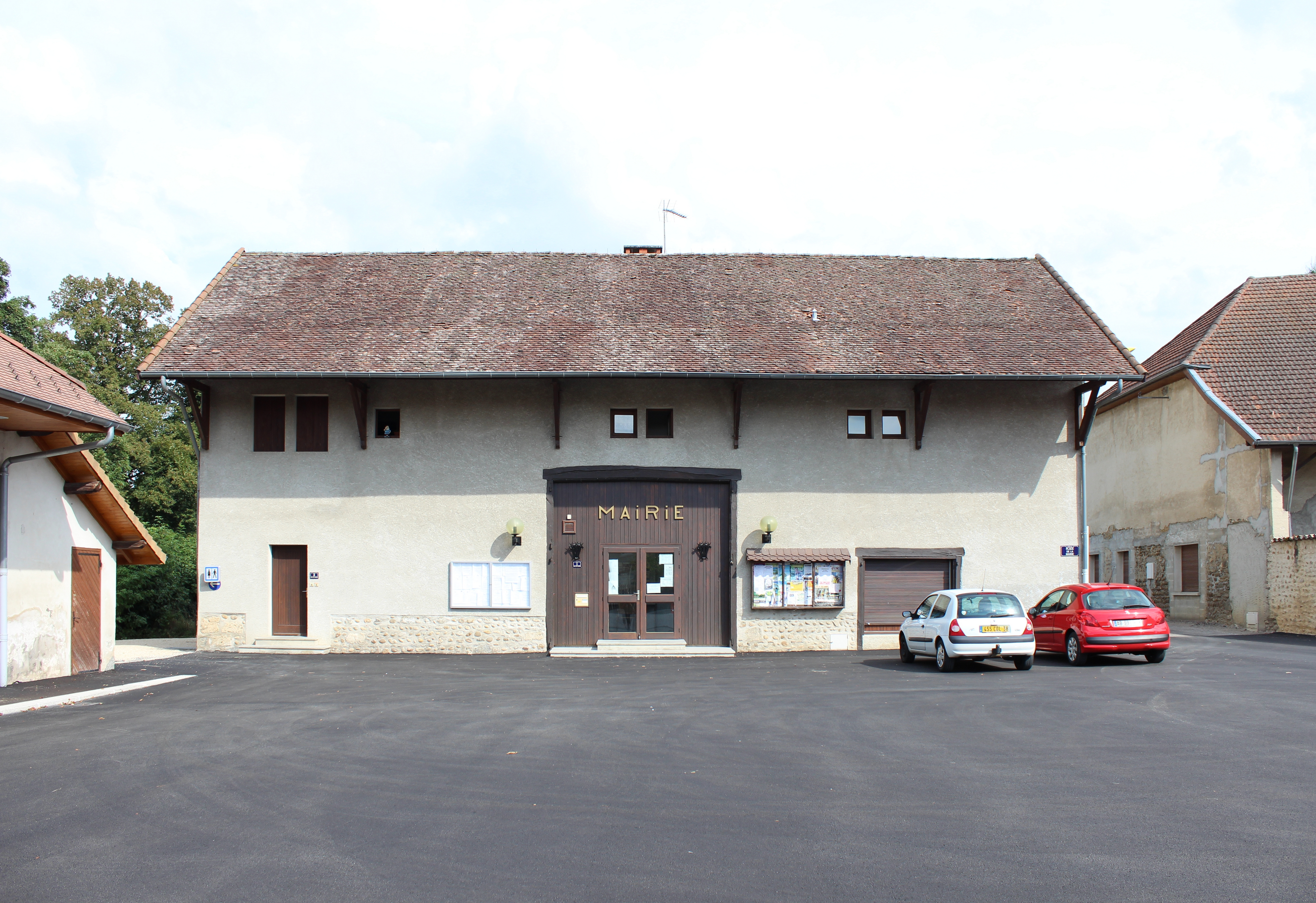
- The town hall of Burcin

- Coat of arms
- Location of Burcin
- Location within France Location within Auvergne-Rhône-Alpes
- Coordinates: 45°25′56″N 5°26′18″E
- Country: France
- Region: Auvergne-Rhône-Alpes
- Department: Isère
- Arrondissement: La Tour-du-Pin
- Canton: Le Grand-Lemps
- Intercommunality: Bièvre Est

Government
  - Mayor (2020–2026): Philippe Margnat
- Area^{1}: 6.69 km^{2} (2.58 sq mi)
- Highest elevation: 734 m (2,408 ft)
- Lowest elevation: 453 m (1,486 ft)
- Population (2023): 430
  - Density: 64/km^{2} (170/sq mi)
- Time zone: UTC+01:00 (CET)
  - Summer (DST): UTC+02:00 (CEST)
- INSEE/Postal code: 38063 /38690
- ^{1} French Land Register data, which excludes lakes, ponds, glaciers > 1 km^{2} (0.386 sq mi or 247 acres) and river estuaries.

Burcin (French pronunciation: [byʁsɛ̃]) is a commune in the Isère department in southeastern France.

== Geography ==
The Bourbre has its source in the commune and forms part of its western border.

== Population ==
Historical population
Year	Pop.	±% p.a.
1968	334	—
1975	303	−1.38%
1982	318	+0.69%
1990	401	+2.94%
1999	370	−0.89%
2007	437	+2.10%
2012	426	−0.51%
2017	423	−0.14%
2023	430	+0.27%
Source: INSEE

== See also ==
- Communes of the Isère department
