= Montagnieu, Isère =

Montagnieu
- Commune
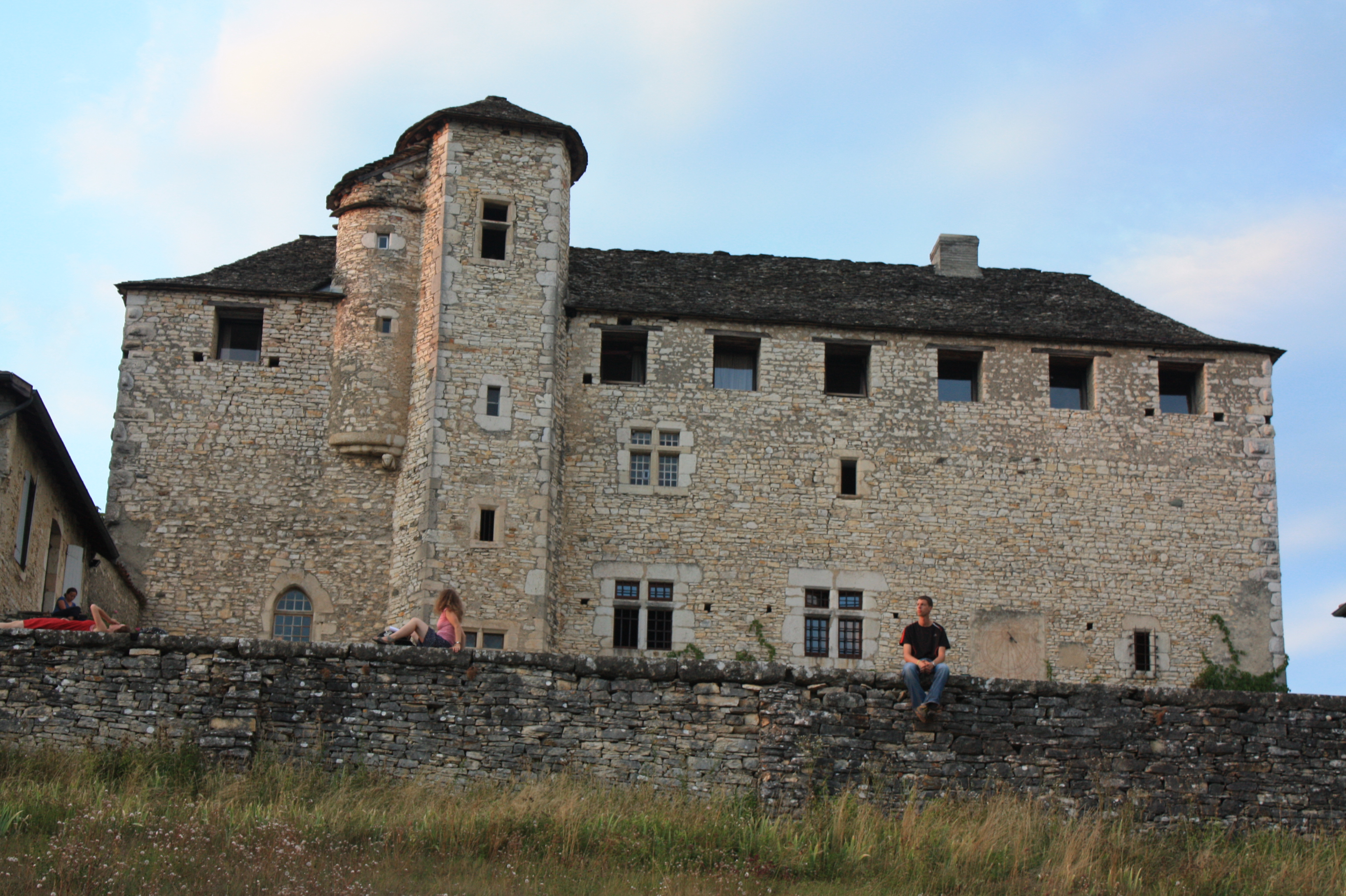
- The fortified house of Montagnieu

- Coat of arms
- Location of Montagnieu
- Location within France Location within Auvergne-Rhône-Alpes
- Coordinates: 45°31′30″N 5°27′11″E
- Country: France
- Region: Auvergne-Rhône-Alpes
- Department: Isère
- Arrondissement: La Tour-du-Pin
- Canton: La Tour-du-Pin

Government
  - Mayor (2020–2026): Christelle Bas
- Area^{1}: 8.83 km^{2} (3.41 sq mi)
- Highest elevation: 582 m (1,909 ft)
- Lowest elevation: 380 m (1,250 ft)
- Population (2023): 1,179
  - Density: 134/km^{2} (346/sq mi)
- Time zone: UTC+01:00 (CET)
  - Summer (DST): UTC+02:00 (CEST)
- INSEE/Postal code: 38246 /38110
- ^{1} French Land Register data, which excludes lakes, ponds, glaciers > 1 km^{2} (0.386 sq mi or 247 acres) and river estuaries.

Montagnieu (French pronunciation: [mɔ̃taɲø]) is a commune in the department of Isère in southeastern France.

== Population ==
Historical population
Year	Pop.	±% p.a.
1968	530	—
1975	482	−1.35%
1982	562	+2.22%
1990	653	+1.89%
1999	701	+0.79%
2007	819	+1.96%
2012	964	+3.31%
2017	1,084	+2.37%
2023	1,179	+1.41%
Source: INSEE

== See also ==
- Communes of the Isère department
