= Chavanoz =

- Commune
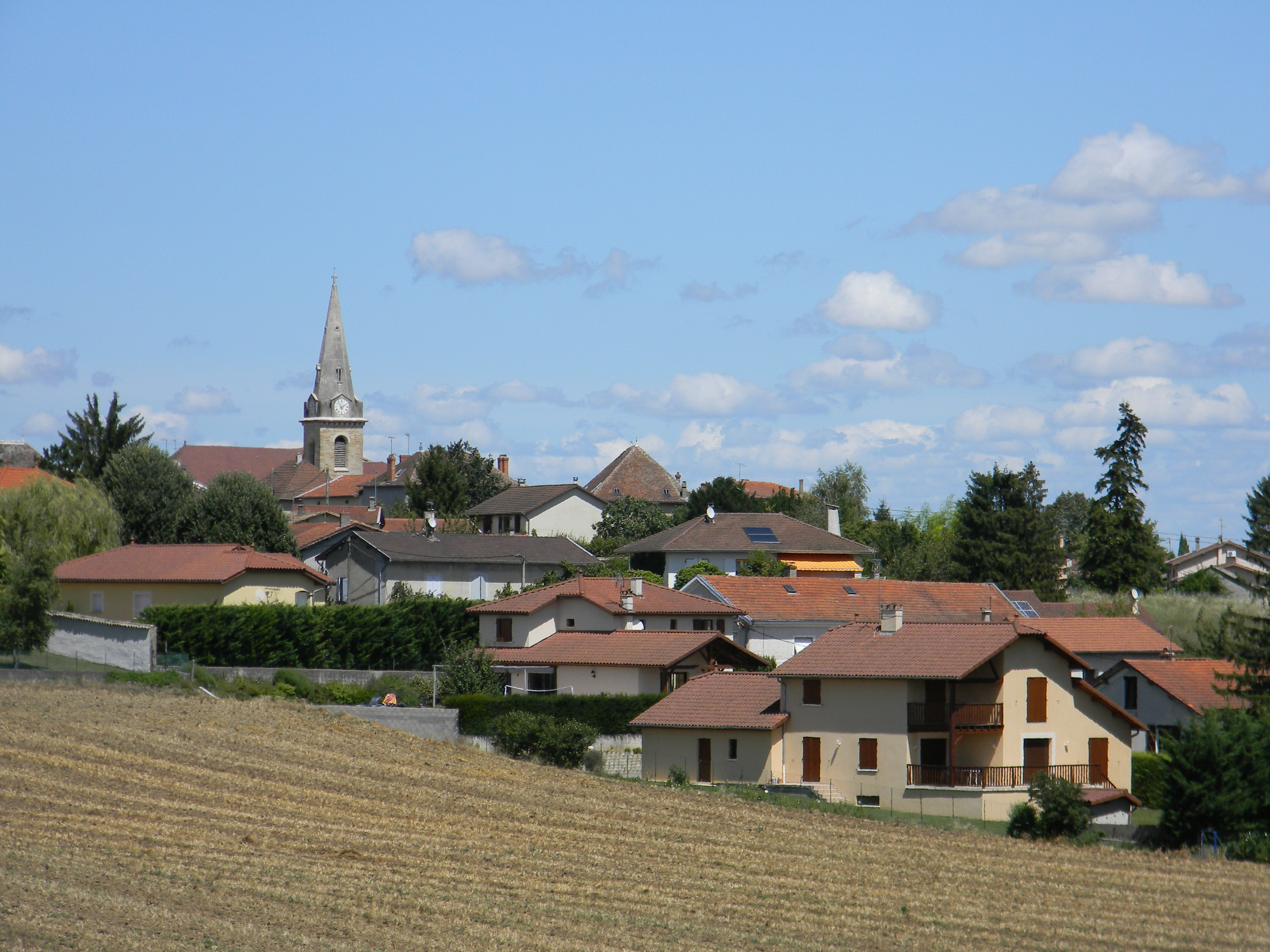
- A general view of Chavanoz

- Coat of arms
- Location of Chavanoz
- Location within France Location within Auvergne-Rhône-Alpes
- Coordinates: 45°46′41″N 5°10′20″E
- Country: France
- Region: Auvergne-Rhône-Alpes
- Department: Isère
- Arrondissement: La Tour-du-Pin
- Canton: Charvieu-Chavagneux

Government
  - Mayor (2020–2026): Roger Davrieux
- Area^{1}: 8.24 km^{2} (3.18 sq mi)
- Elevation: 237 m (778 ft)
- Highest elevation: 245 m (804 ft)
- Lowest elevation: 188 m (617 ft)
- Population (2019): 4,870
  - Density: 591/km^{2} (1,530/sq mi)
- Time zone: UTC+01:00 (CET)
  - Summer (DST): UTC+02:00 (CEST)
- INSEE/Postal code: 38097 /38230
- ^{1} French Land Register data, which excludes lakes, ponds, glaciers > 1 km^{2} (0.386 sq mi or 247 acres) and river estuaries.

Chavanoz (French pronunciation: [ʃavanoz]) is a commune in the Isère department in southeastern France.

== Geography ==
The Bourbre flows north through the eastern part of the commune, then flows into the Rhone.

== Population ==
Historical population

Year	Pop.	±% p.a.
1793	443	—
1800	474	+0.97%
1806	447	−0.97%
1821	673	+2.77%
1831	871	+2.61%
1836	1,113	+5.03%
1841	1,212	+1.72%
1846	1,099	−1.94%
1851	1,139	+0.72%
1856	1,245	+1.80%
1861	1,234	−0.18%
1866	1,222	−0.20%
1872	900	−4.97%
1876	850	−1.42%
1881	906	+1.28%
1886	932	+0.57%
1891	914	−0.39%
1896	927	+0.28%
1901	930	+0.06%

Year	Pop.	±% p.a.
1906	880	−1.10%
1911	919	+0.87%
1921	902	−0.19%
1926	1,047	+3.03%
1931	1,020	−0.52%
1936	1,009	−0.22%
1946	1,047	+0.37%
1954	1,166	+1.35%
1962	1,382	+2.15%
1968	1,935	+5.77%
1975	2,350	+2.81%
1982	3,834	+7.24%
1990	3,900	+0.21%
1999	3,954	+0.15%
2007	4,127	+0.54%
2012	4,323	+0.93%
2017	4,685	+1.62%
2023	5,126	+1.51%

Source: EHESS and INSEE (1968-2023)

== See also ==
- Communes of the Isère department
