= Rochetoirin =

- Commune
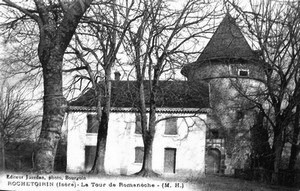
- The château of Romanèche at the start of the 20th century
- Location of Rochetoirin
- Location within France Location within Auvergne-Rhône-Alpes
- Coordinates: 45°34′57″N 5°25′08″E
- Country: France
- Region: Auvergne-Rhône-Alpes
- Department: Isère
- Arrondissement: La Tour-du-Pin
- Canton: La Tour-du-Pin

Government
  - Mayor (2020–2026): Marie-Christine Frachon
- Area^{1}: 10.62 km^{2} (4.10 sq mi)
- Highest elevation: 487 m (1,598 ft)
- Lowest elevation: 302 m (991 ft)
- Population (2023): 1,090
  - Density: 103/km^{2} (266/sq mi)
- Time zone: UTC+01:00 (CET)
  - Summer (DST): UTC+02:00 (CEST)
- INSEE/Postal code: 38341 /38110
- ^{1} French Land Register data, which excludes lakes, ponds, glaciers > 1 km^{2} (0.386 sq mi or 247 acres) and river estuaries.

Rochetoirin (French pronunciation: [ʁɔʃtwaʁɛ̃]) is a commune in the Isère department in southeastern France.

== Population ==
Historical population
Year	Pop.	±% p.a.
1968	361	—
1975	384	+0.89%
1982	518	+4.37%
1990	671	+3.29%
1999	863	+2.84%
2007	985	+1.67%
2012	1,077	+1.80%
2017	1,116	+0.71%
2023	1,090	−0.39%
Source: INSEE

== Twin towns ==
Rochetoirin is twinned with:

- Aspach-le-Haut, France

== See also ==
- Communes of the Isère department
