= Cessieu =

- Commune
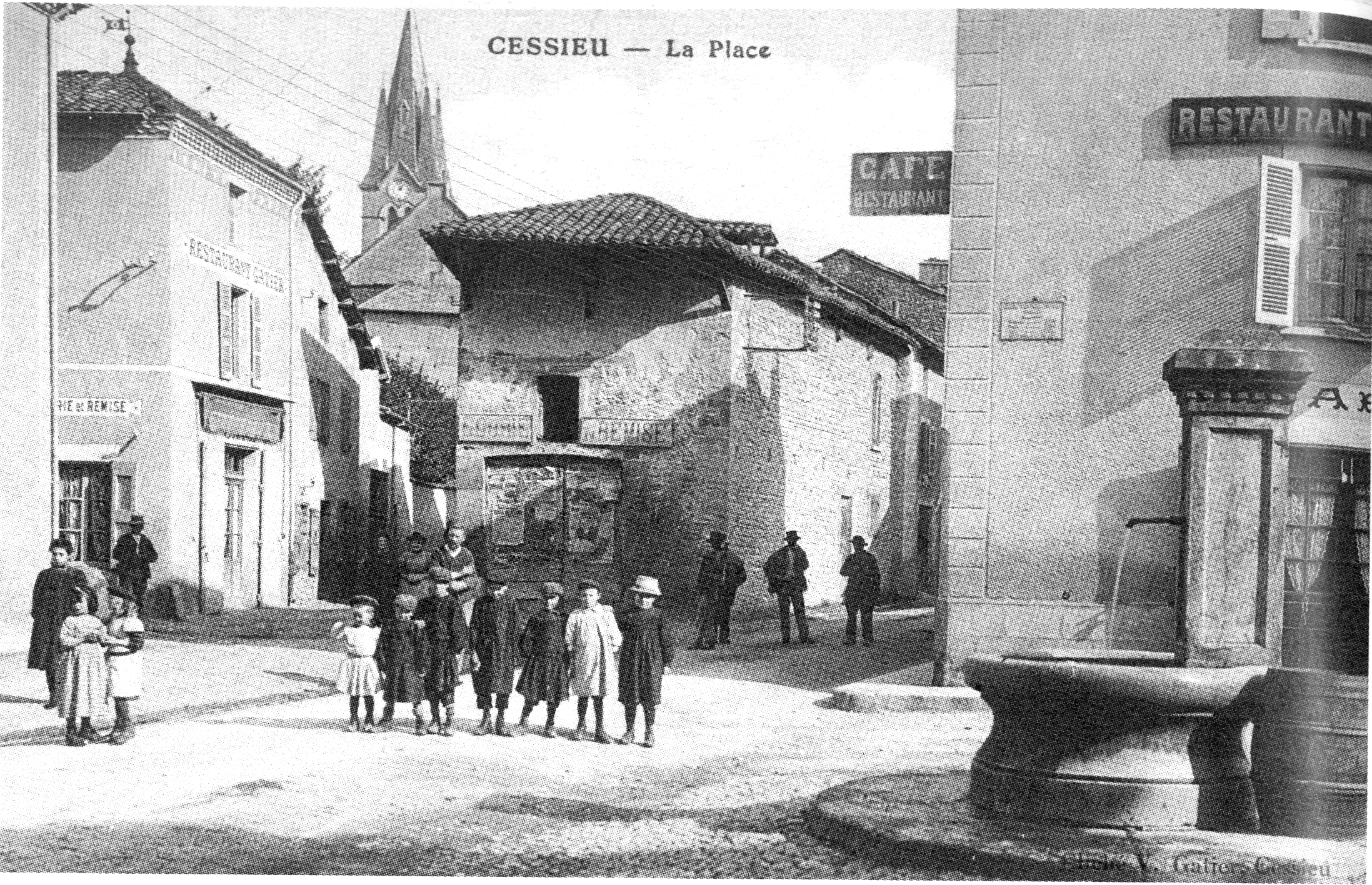
- The village square in 1925

- Coat of arms
- Location of Cessieu
- Location within France Location within Auvergne-Rhône-Alpes
- Coordinates: 45°34′03″N 5°22′39″E
- Country: France
- Region: Auvergne-Rhône-Alpes
- Department: Isère
- Arrondissement: La Tour-du-Pin
- Canton: La Tour-du-Pin

Government
  - Mayor (2020–2026): Christophe Brochard
- Area^{1}: 14.35 km^{2} (5.54 sq mi)
- Elevation: 309 m (1,014 ft)
- Highest elevation: 508 m (1,667 ft)
- Lowest elevation: 278 m (912 ft)
- Population (2023): 3,259
  - Density: 227.1/km^{2} (588.2/sq mi)
- Time zone: UTC+01:00 (CET)
  - Summer (DST): UTC+02:00 (CEST)
- INSEE/Postal code: 38064 /38110
- ^{1} French Land Register data, which excludes lakes, ponds, glaciers > 1 km^{2} (0.386 sq mi or 247 acres) and river estuaries.

Cessieu (French pronunciation: [sɛsjø]) is a commune in the Isère department in south-eastern France.

== Geography ==
The Bourbre flows west through the middle of the commune and crosses the village.

== Population ==
Historical population

Year	Pop.	±% p.a.
1793	1,606	—
1800	1,676	+0.61%
1806	1,698	+0.22%
1821	1,828	+0.49%
1831	2,012	+0.96%
1836	2,022	+0.10%
1841	2,033	+0.11%
1846	1,982	−0.51%
1851	1,858	−1.28%
1856	1,777	−0.89%
1861	1,728	−0.56%
1866	1,712	−0.19%
1872	1,687	−0.24%
1876	1,674	−0.19%
1881	1,566	−1.32%
1886	1,532	−0.44%
1891	1,438	−1.26%
1896	1,364	−1.05%
1901	1,300	−0.96%

Year	Pop.	±% p.a.
1906	1,227	−1.15%
1911	1,206	−0.34%
1921	1,020	−1.66%
1926	1,154	+2.50%
1931	1,127	−0.47%
1936	1,116	−0.20%
1946	1,167	+0.45%
1954	1,161	−0.06%
1962	1,343	+1.84%
1968	1,609	+3.06%
1975	1,610	+0.01%
1982	1,682	+0.63%
1990	2,025	+2.35%
1999	2,112	+0.47%
2007	2,558	+2.42%
2012	2,679	+0.93%
2017	2,984	+2.18%
2023	3,259	+1.48%

Source: EHESS and INSEE (1968-2023)

== Twin towns ==
Cessieu is twinned with:

- Civitella Roveto, Italy, since 2004

== See also ==
- Communes of the Isère department
