= La Tour-du-Pin =

Subprefecture of Isère, Auvergne-Rhône-Alpes, France

La Tour-du-Pin La Tor-du-Pin (Arpitan)
- Subprefecture and commune
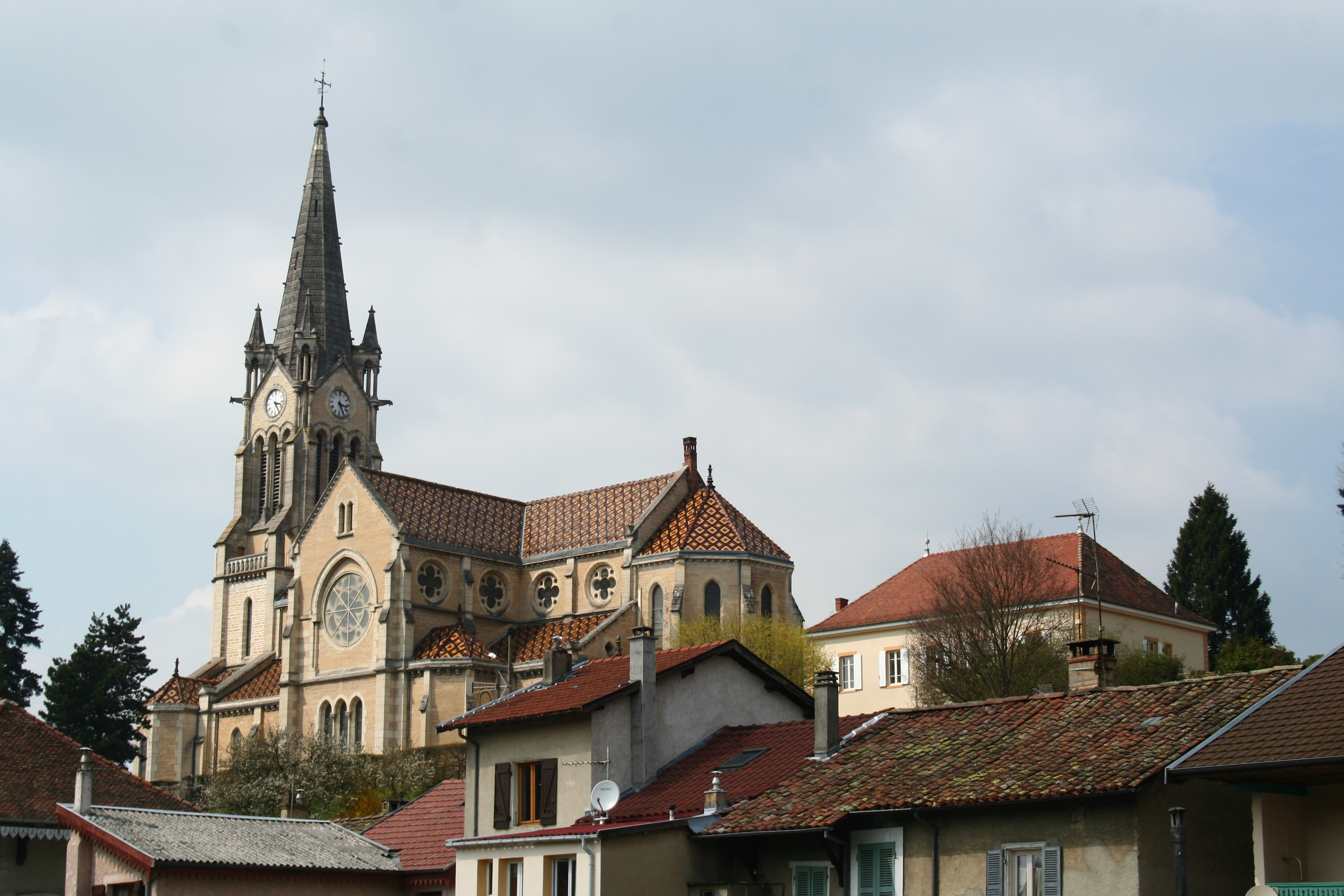
- Notre-Dame de l'Assomption in La Tour-du-Pin

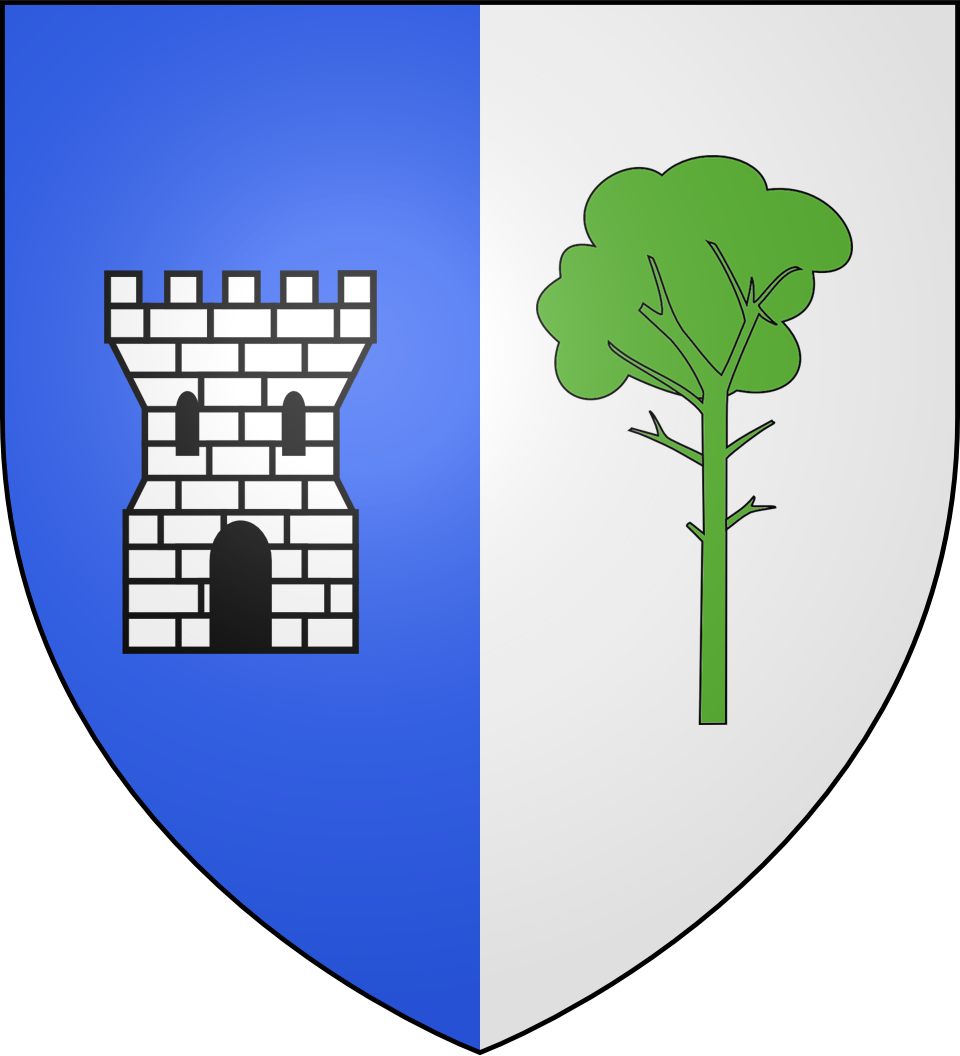
- Coat of arms
- Location of La Tour-du-Pin
- Location within France Location within Auvergne-Rhône-Alpes
- Coordinates: 45°33′54″N 5°26′40″E
- Country: France
- Region: Auvergne-Rhône-Alpes
- Department: Isère
- Arrondissement: La Tour-du-Pin
- Canton: La Tour-du-Pin

Government
  - Mayor (2023–2026): Claire Durand
- Area^{1}: 4.77 km^{2} (1.84 sq mi)
- Elevation: 339 m (1,112 ft)
- Highest elevation: 461 m (1,512 ft)
- Lowest elevation: 309 m (1,014 ft)
- Population (2023): 8,111
  - Density: 1,700/km^{2} (4,400/sq mi)
- Time zone: UTC+01:00 (CET)
  - Summer (DST): UTC+02:00 (CEST)
- INSEE/Postal code: 38509 /38110
- ^{1} French Land Register data, which excludes lakes, ponds, glaciers > 1 km^{2} (0.386 sq mi or 247 acres) and river estuaries.

La Tour-du-Pin (French pronunciation: [la tuʁ dy pɛ̃]; Arpitan: La Tor-du-Pin) is a subprefecture of the Isère department in the Auvergne-Rhône-Alpes region in Southeastern France.

== Geography ==
The Bourbre flows west through the southern part of the commune and crosses the town. The town's lowest point is at 309 m (1,014 ft) and the highest at 461 m (1,512 ft). La Tour-du-Pin railway station is located approximately 500 m to the south-east of the town center.

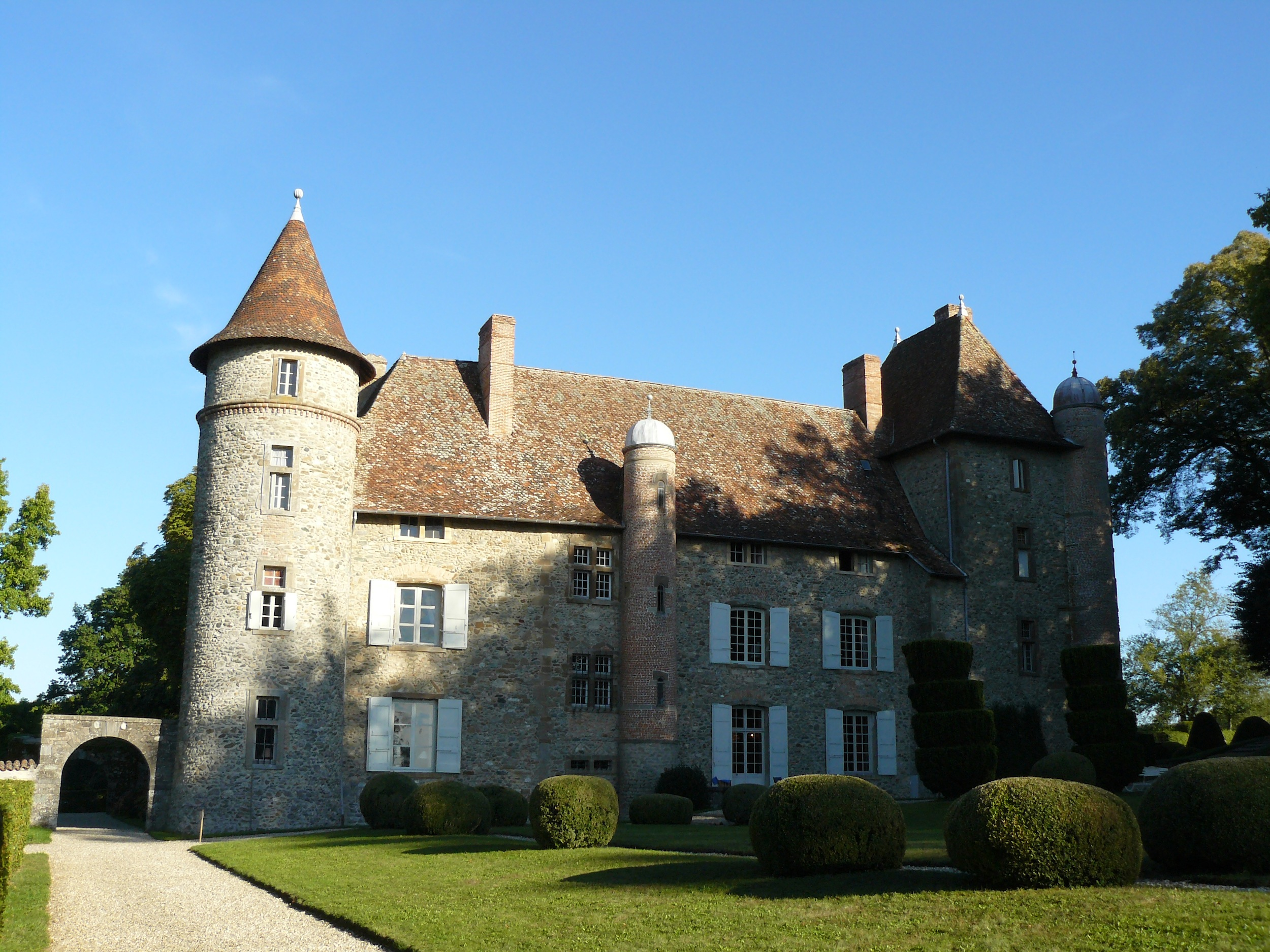
Château de Tournin

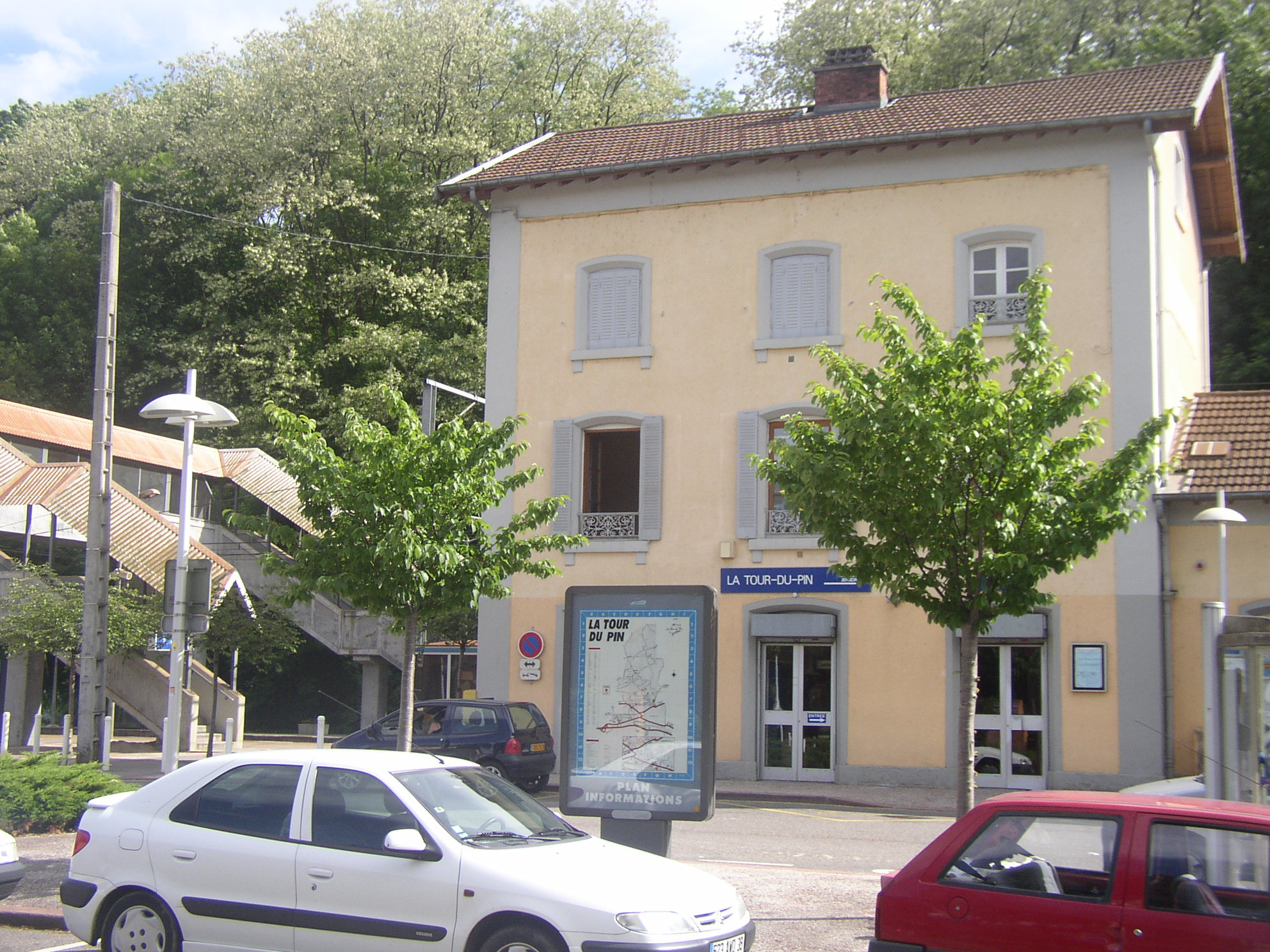
La Tour-du-Pin station

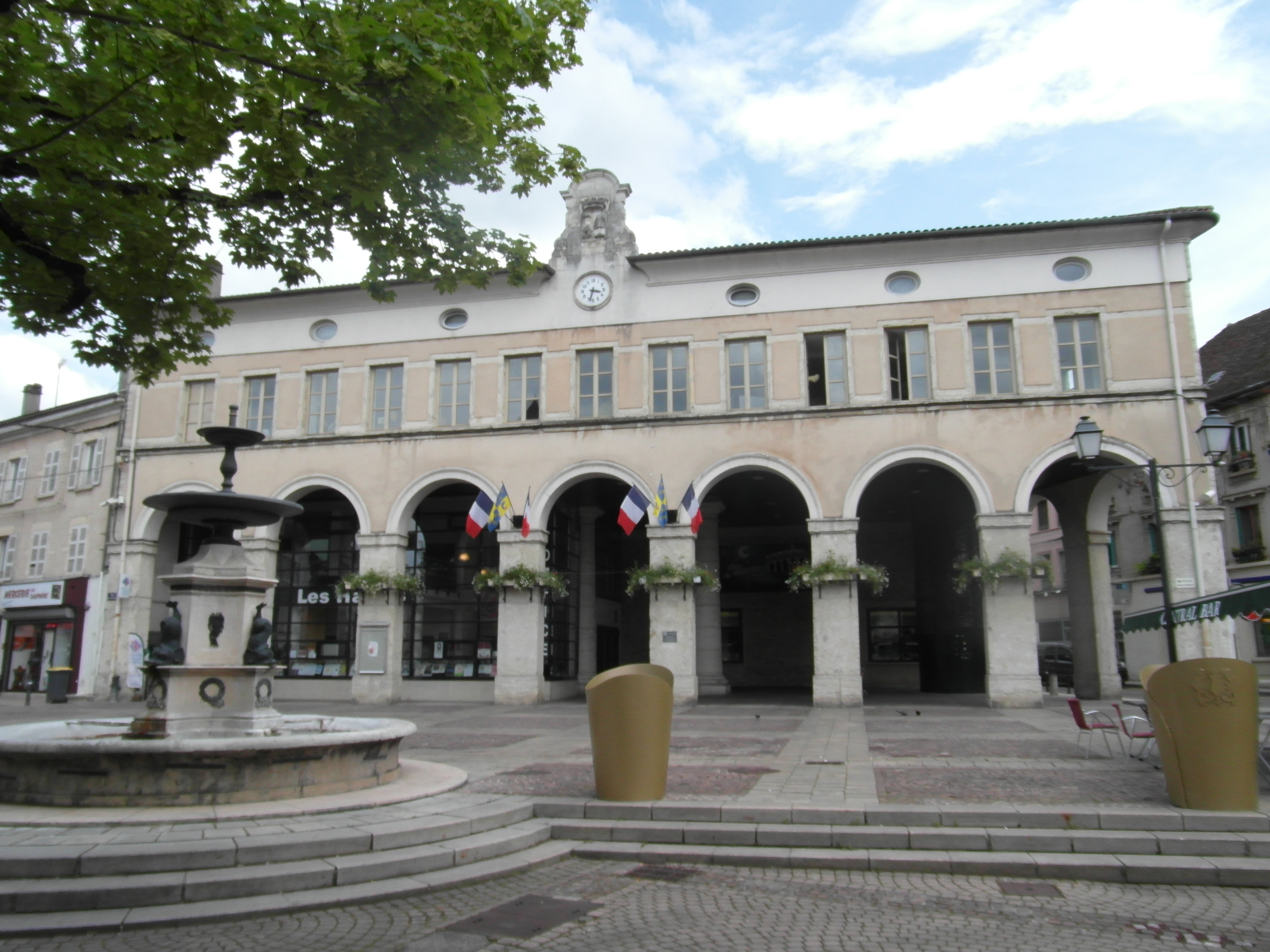
Halles

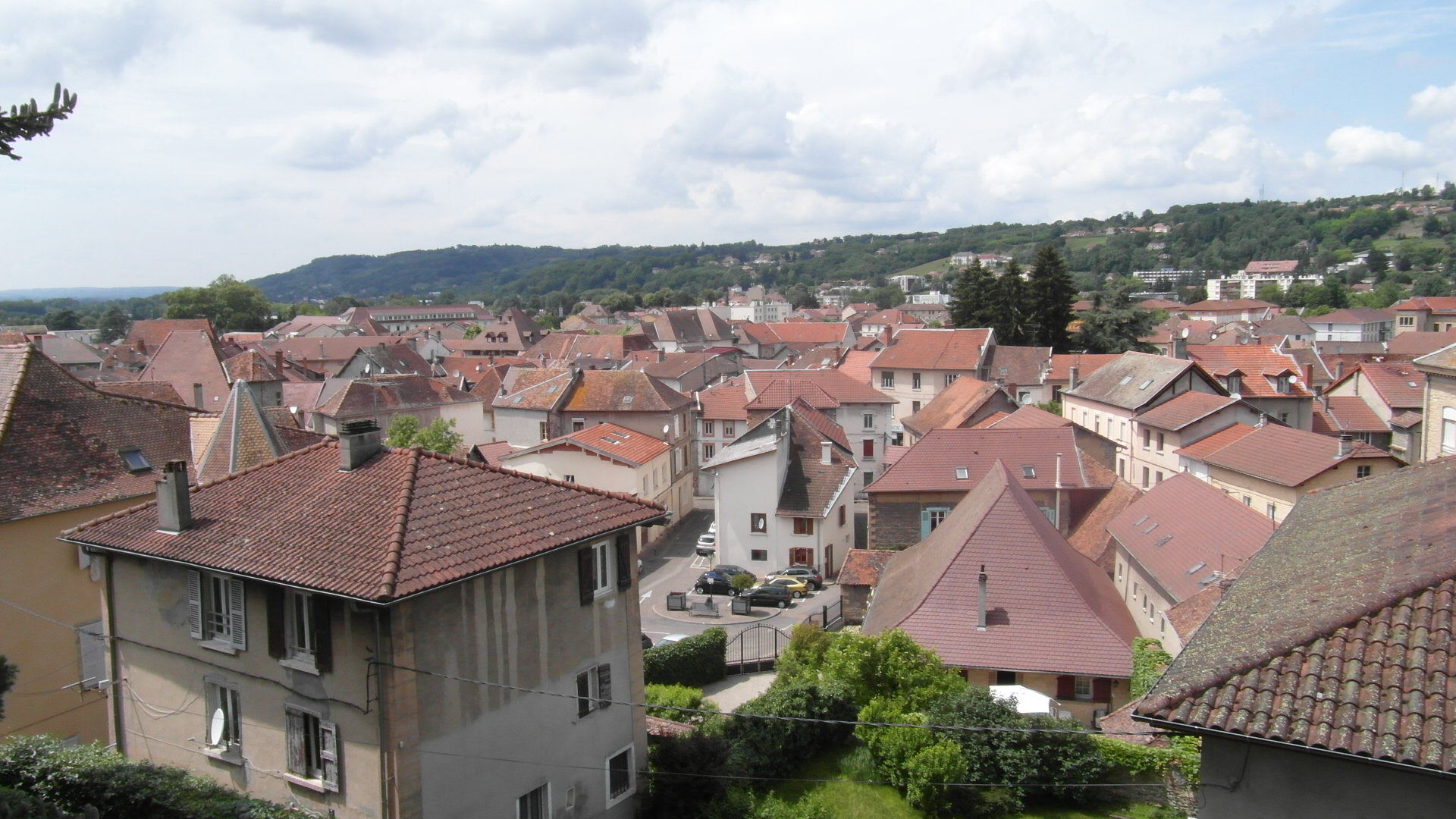
General view

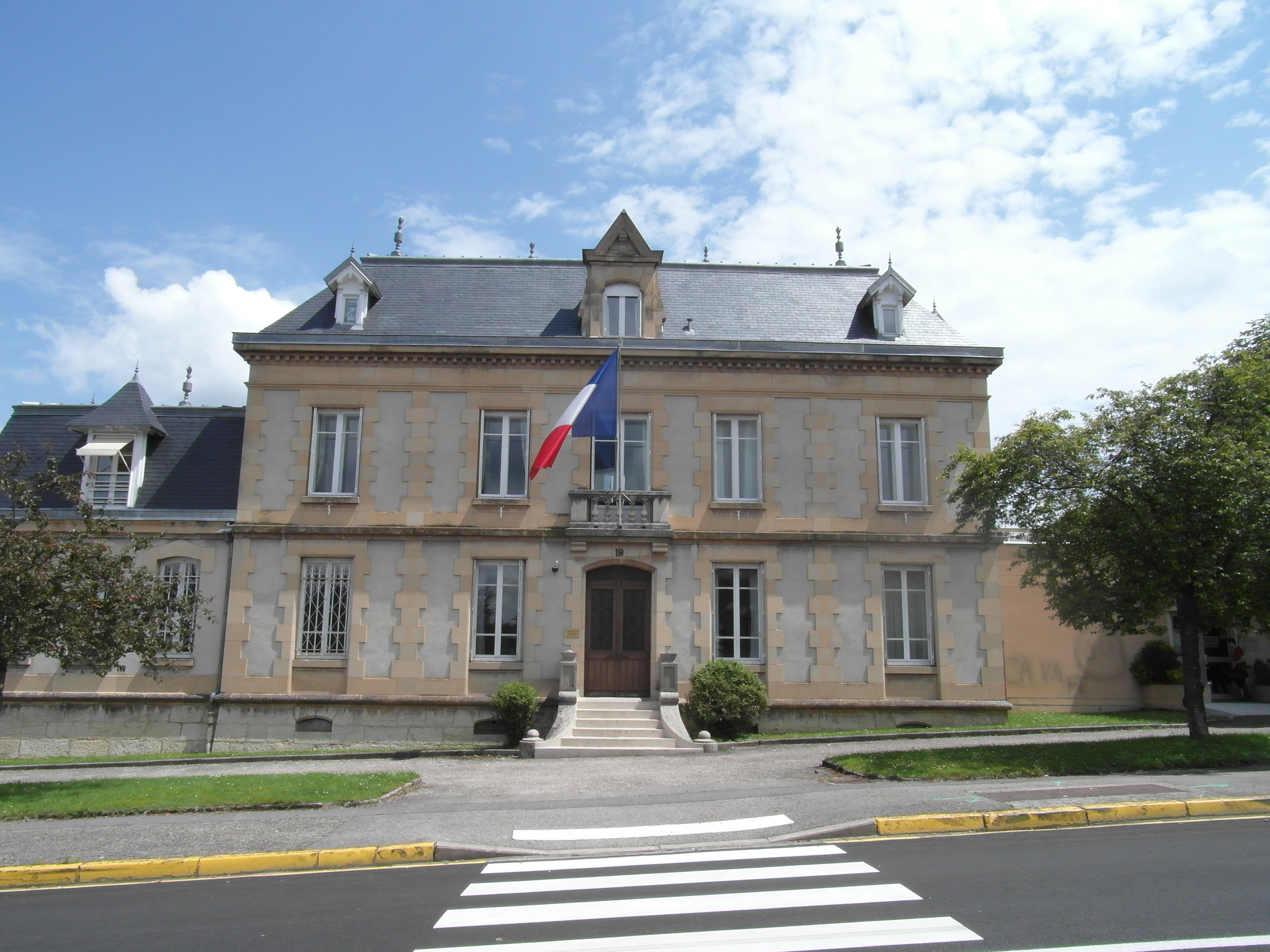
Subprefecture building

== Population and society ==
Historical population

Year	Pop.	±% p.a.
1793	3,098	—
1800	1,139	−13.32%
1806	1,540	+5.16%
1821	1,971	+1.66%
1831	2,334	+1.70%
1836	2,484	+1.25%
1841	2,456	−0.23%
1846	2,665	+1.65%
1851	2,572	−0.71%
1856	2,572	+0.00%
1861	2,699	+0.97%
1866	2,809	+0.80%
1872	2,857	+0.28%
1876	3,165	+2.59%
1881	3,571	+2.44%
1886	3,636	+0.36%
1891	3,520	−0.65%
1896	3,704	+1.02%
1901	3,803	+0.53%

Year	Pop.	±% p.a.
1906	3,985	+0.94%
1911	4,032	+0.23%
1921	3,959	−0.18%
1926	4,451	+2.37%
1931	4,465	+0.06%
1936	4,151	−1.45%
1946	4,117	−0.08%
1954	4,459	+1.00%
1962	4,694	+0.64%
1968	5,649	+3.13%
1975	6,641	+2.34%
1982	6,913	+0.58%
1990	6,770	−0.26%
1999	6,553	−0.36%
2007	7,541	+1.77%
2012	7,927	+1.00%
2017	8,080	+0.38%
2023	8,111	+0.06%

Source: EHESS and INSEE (1968-2023)

=== Education ===
There are three public nursery and elementary schools (École Jean Rostand, École Albert Thevenon, and École Louis Pasteur) and one private nursery and primary school, the École St Joseph. There are also two public middle schools: the Collège Les Dauphins and the Collège Le Calloud, and one private middle school, the Collège St Bruno, there is one public high school too, the Lycée Élie Cartan, and one technical high school for learning of the horticulture.

=== Sport ===
There is a football club (FCTC), a rugby club (RCVT) and a basket-ball club (BVT).

== See also ==
- Communes of the Isère department
