= Biol =

Biol may refer to:

- Abbreviation for Biology
- Biol, a commune of the Isère département, in France
