= Arrondissement of La Tour-du-Pin =

Coordinates: 45°33′47″N 5°26′34″E

La Tour-du-Pin
- Arrondissement
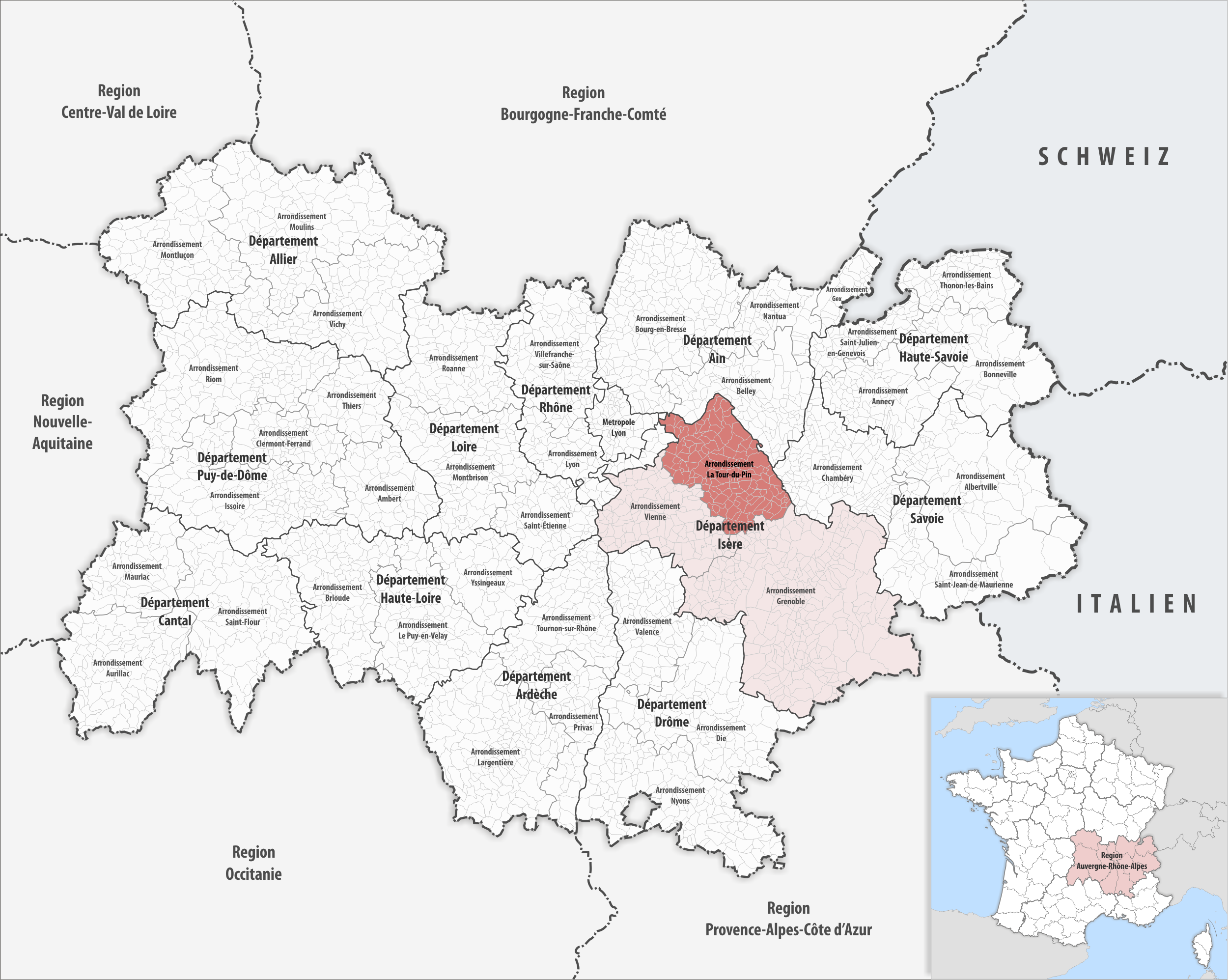
- Location within the region Auvergne-Rhône-Alpes
- Country: France
- Region: Auvergne-Rhône-Alpes
- Department: Isère
- No. of communes: {{{nbcomm}}}
- Area: 1,543.1 km^{2} (595.8 sq mi)
- Population (2023): 320,732
  - Density: 207.85/km^{2} (538.33/sq mi)
- INSEE code: 382

The arrondissement of La Tour-du-Pin is an arrondissement of France in the Isère department in the Auvergne-Rhône-Alpes region. It has 136 communes. Its population is 315,625 (2021), and its area is 1,543.1 km^{2} (595.8 sq mi).

== Composition ==
The communes of the arrondissement of La Tour-du-Pin, and their INSEE codes, are:

1. Les Abrets-en-Dauphiné (38001)
2. Annoisin-Chatelans (38010)
3. Anthon (38011)
4. Aoste (38012)
5. Apprieu (38013)
6. Arandon-Passins (38297)
7. Les Avenières-Veyrins-Thuellin (38022)
8. La Balme-les-Grottes (38026)
9. La Bâtie-Montgascon (38029)
10. Belmont (38038)
11. Bévenais (38042)
12. Bilieu (38043)
13. Biol (38044)
14. Bizonnes (38046)
15. Blandin (38047)
16. Bonnefamille (38048)
17. Le Bouchage (38050)
18. Bourgoin-Jallieu (38053)
19. Bouvesse-Quirieu (38054)
20. Brangues (38055)
21. Burcin (38063)
22. Cessieu (38064)
23. Châbons (38065)
24. Chamagnieu (38067)
25. La Chapelle-de-la-Tour (38076)
26. Charancieu (38080)
27. Charavines (38082)
28. Charette (38083)
29. Charvieu-Chavagneux (38085)
30. Chassignieu (38089)
31. Châteauvilain (38091)
32. Chavanoz (38097)
33. Chélieu (38098)
34. Chèzeneuve (38102)
35. Chimilin (38104)
36. Chozeau (38109)
37. Colombe (38118)
38. Corbelin (38124)
39. Courtenay (38135)
40. Crachier (38136)
41. Crémieu (38138)
42. Creys-Mépieu (38139)
43. Dizimieu (38146)
44. Doissin (38147)
45. Dolomieu (38148)
46. Domarin (38149)
47. Eclose-Badinières (38152)
48. Les Éparres (38156)
49. Eydoche (38159)
50. Faverges-de-la-Tour (38162)
51. Flachères (38167)
52. Four (38172)
53. Frontonas (38176)
54. Le Grand-Lemps (38182)
55. Granieu (38183)
56. Hières-sur-Amby (38190)
57. L'Isle-d'Abeau (38193)
58. Janneyrias (38197)
59. Leyrieu (38210)
60. Massieu (38222)
61. Maubec (38223)
62. Merlas (38228)
63. Meyrié (38230)
64. Montagnieu, Isère (38246)
65. Montalieu-Vercieu (38247)
66. Montcarra (38250)
67. Montferrat (38256)
68. Montrevel, Isère (38257)
69. Moras (38260)
70. Morestel (38261)
71. Nivolas-Vermelle (38276)
72. Optevoz (38282)
73. Oyeu (38287)
74. Panossas (38294)
75. Parmilieu (38295)
76. Le Passage (38296)
77. Le Pont-de-Beauvoisin (38315)
78. Pont-de-Chéruy (38316)
79. Porcieu-Amblagnieu (38320)
80. Pressins (38323)
81. Roche (38339)
82. Rochetoirin (38341)
83. Romagnieu (38343)
84. Ruy-Montceau (38348)
85. Saint-Alban-de-Roche (38352)
86. Saint-Albin-de-Vaulserre (38354)
87. Saint-André-le-Gaz (38357)
88. Saint-Baudille-de-la-Tour (38365)
89. Saint-Bueil (38372)
90. Saint-Chef (38374)
91. Saint-Clair-de-la-Tour (38377)
92. Saint-Didier-de-Bizonnes (38380)
93. Saint-Didier-de-la-Tour (38381)
94. Sainte-Blandine (38369)
95. Saint-Geoire-en-Valdaine (38386)
96. Saint-Hilaire-de-Brens (38392)
97. Saint-Jean-d'Avelanne (38398)
98. Saint-Jean-de-Soudain (38401)
99. Saint-Marcel-Bel-Accueil (38415)
100. Saint-Martin-de-Vaulserre (38420)
101. Saint-Ondras (38434)
102. Saint-Quentin-Fallavier (38449)
103. Saint-Romain-de-Jalionas (38451)
104. Saint-Savin (38455)
105. Saint-Sorlin-de-Morestel (38458)
106. Saint-Sulpice-des-Rivoires (38460)
107. Saint-Victor-de-Cessieu (38464)
108. Saint-Victor-de-Morestel (38465)
109. Salagnon (38467)
110. Satolas-et-Bonce (38475)
111. Sérézin-de-la-Tour (38481)
112. Sermérieu (38483)
113. Siccieu-Saint-Julien-et-Carisieu (38488)
114. Soleymieu (38494)
115. Succieu (38498)
116. Tignieu-Jameyzieu (38507)
117. Torchefelon (38508)
118. La Tour-du-Pin (38509)
119. Trept (38515)
120. Val-de-Virieu (38560)
121. Valencogne (38520)
122. Vasselin (38525)
123. Vaulx-Milieu (38530)
124. Velanne (38531)
125. Vénérieu (38532)
126. Vernas (38535)
127. La Verpillière (38537)
128. Vertrieu (38539)
129. Veyssilieu (38542)
130. Vézeronce-Curtin (38543)
131. Vignieu (38546)
132. Villages du Lac de Paladru (38292)
133. Villefontaine (38553)
134. Villemoirieu (38554)
135. Villette-d'Anthon (38557)
136. Voissant (38564)

== History ==
The arrondissement of La Tour-du-Pin was created in 1800. At the January 2017 reorganisation of the arrondissements of Isère, it gained six communes from the arrondissement of Vienne, and it lost one commune to the arrondissement of Vienne.

As a result of the reorganisation of the cantons of France which came into effect in 2015, the borders of the cantons are no longer related to the borders of the arrondissements. The cantons of the arrondissement of La Tour-du-Pin were, as of January 2015:

1. Bourgoin-Jallieu-Nord
2. Bourgoin-Jallieu-Sud
3. Crémieu
4. Le Grand-Lemps
5. L'Isle-d'Abeau
6. Morestel
7. Le Pont-de-Beauvoisin
8. Saint-Geoire-en-Valdaine
9. La Tour-du-Pin
10. La Verpillière
11. Virieu
