= Saint-Didier-de-Bizonnes =

- Commune
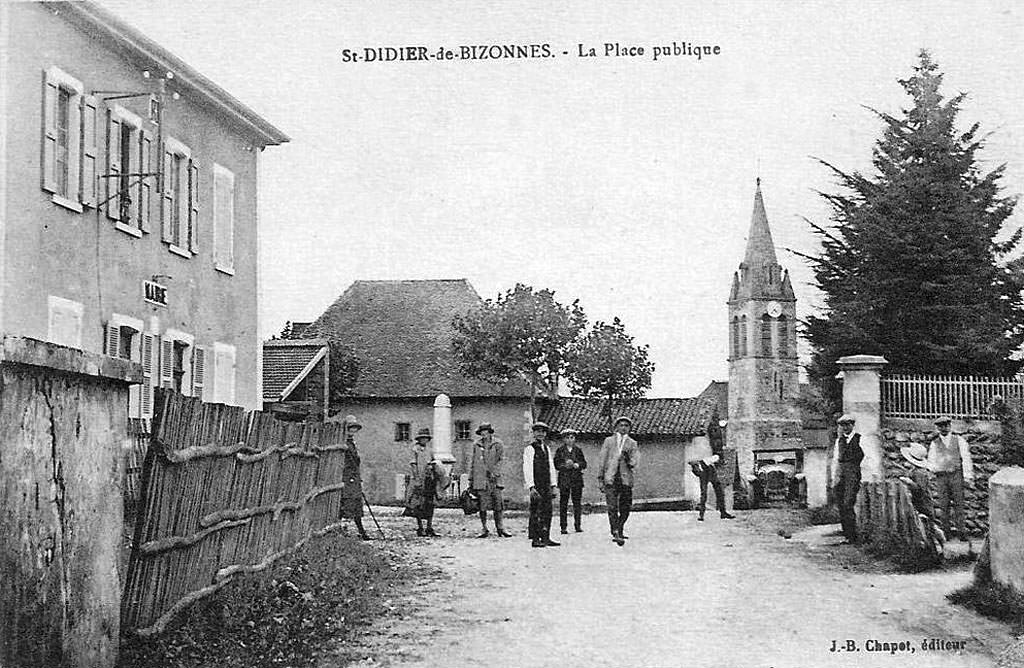
- Saint-Didier-de-Bizonnes at the start of the 20th century
- Location of Saint-Didier-de-Bizonnes
- Location within France Location within Auvergne-Rhône-Alpes
- Coordinates: 45°28′05″N 5°21′06″E
- Country: France
- Region: Auvergne-Rhône-Alpes
- Department: Isère
- Arrondissement: La Tour-du-Pin
- Canton: Le Grand-Lemps
- Intercommunality: Bièvre Est

Government
  - Mayor (2020–2026): Joëlle Anglereaux
- Area^{1}: 7.2 km^{2} (2.8 sq mi)
- Elevation: 530 m (1,740 ft)
- Highest elevation: 647 m (2,123 ft)
- Lowest elevation: 514 m (1,686 ft)
- Population (2023): 341
  - Density: 47/km^{2} (120/sq mi)
- Time zone: UTC+01:00 (CET)
  - Summer (DST): UTC+02:00 (CEST)
- INSEE/Postal code: 38380 /38690
- ^{1} French Land Register data, which excludes lakes, ponds, glaciers > 1 km^{2} (0.386 sq mi or 247 acres) and river estuaries.

Saint-Didier-de-Bizonnes (French pronunciation: [sɛ̃ didje də bizɔn], literally Saint-Didier of Bizonnes) is a commune in the Isère department in southeastern France.

== Population ==
Historical population
Year	Pop.	±% p.a.
1968	181	—
1975	170	−0.89%
1982	147	−2.06%
1990	175	+2.20%
1999	208	+1.94%
2007	241	+1.86%
2012	297	+4.27%
2017	302	+0.33%
2023	341	+2.04%
Source: INSEE

== See also ==
- Communes of the Isère department
