= Montrevel =

Montrevel may refer to:

- Montrevel, Isère, a commune of the French region of Rhône-Alpes
- Montrevel, Jura, a commune of the French region of Franche-Comté
- Montrevel-en-Bresse, a commune of the French region of Rhône-Alpes
