= Apprieu =

- Commune
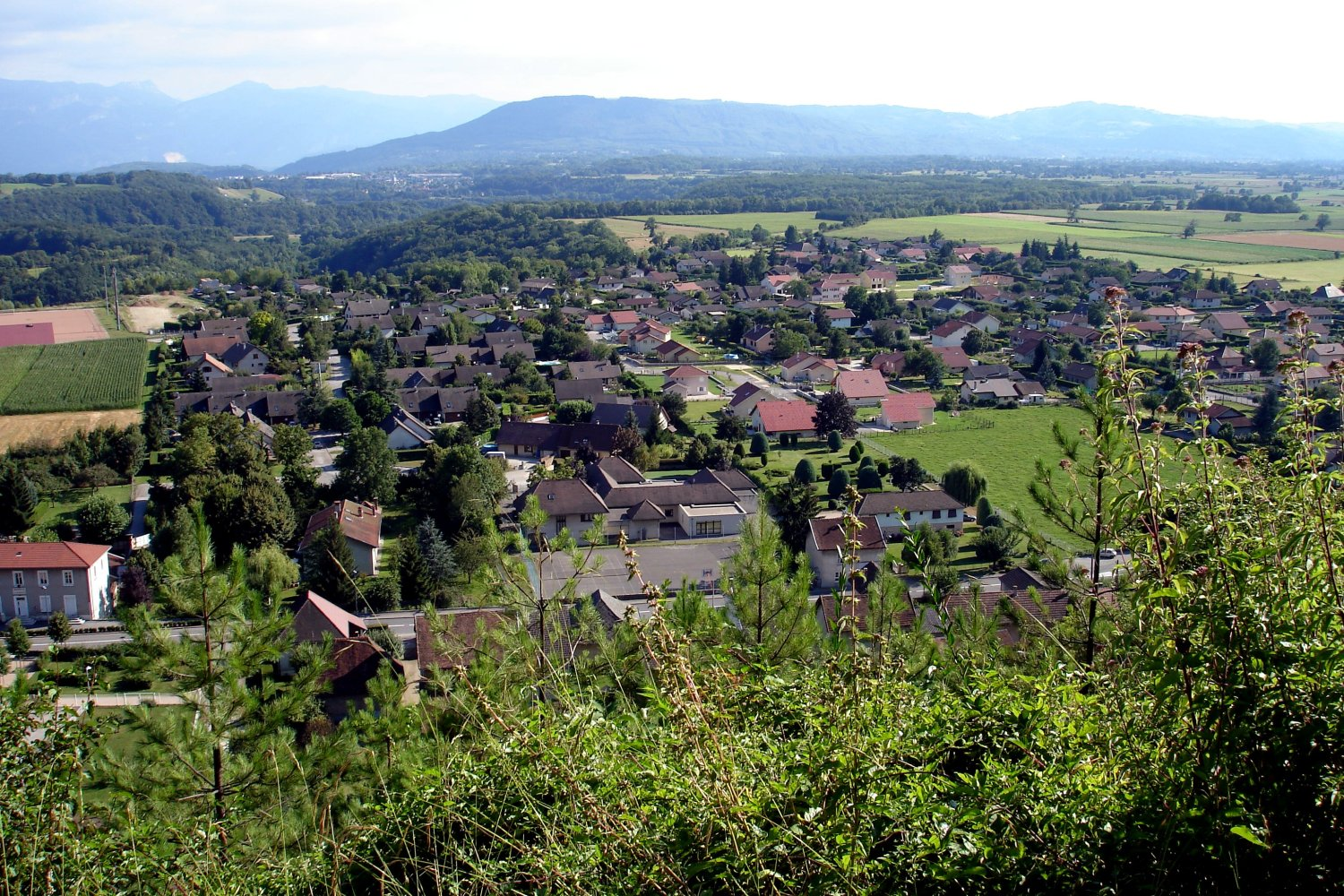
- General View to the South-west

- Coat of arms
- Location of Apprieu
- Location within France Location within Auvergne-Rhône-Alpes
- Coordinates: 45°24′04″N 5°29′31″E
- Country: France
- Region: Auvergne-Rhône-Alpes
- Department: Isère
- Arrondissement: La Tour-du-Pin
- Canton: Le Grand-Lemps
- Intercommunality: Bièvre Est

Government
  - Mayor (2020–2026): Dominique Pallier
- Area^{1}: 15.09 km^{2} (5.83 sq mi)
- Highest elevation: 773 m (2,536 ft)
- Lowest elevation: 371 m (1,217 ft)
- Population (2023): 3,615
  - Density: 239.6/km^{2} (620.5/sq mi)
- Time zone: UTC+01:00 (CET)
  - Summer (DST): UTC+02:00 (CEST)
- INSEE/Postal code: 38013 /38140
- ^{1} French Land Register data, which excludes lakes, ponds, glaciers > 1 km^{2} (0.386 sq mi or 247 acres) and river estuaries.

Apprieu (French pronunciation: [apʁijø]) is a commune in the Isère department in the Auvergne-Rhône-Alpes region of southeastern France.

== Geography ==
Apprieu is located some 60 km east by south-east of Vienne and 12 km north-west of Voiron stretching along the southern slope of a hill originating from a moraine of Alpine glaciers from the last ice age. Access to the commune is by road D520 from Colombe in the west passing through the town and continuing east to La Murette. The A48 autoroute passes through the southern tip of the commune but has no exit until Exit 9 just to the west of the commune. Apart from the town there are also the hamlets of Plan Bois in the north-east and Le Rivier in the south. The commune north of the town is heavily forested while to the south is mostly farmland with forests to a lesser extent.

The Fure river follows the eastern and southern borders of the commune then flows south to join the Morge river at Le Port.

== History ==
Apprieu, from the Latin Apprius - an anagram of "Priapus", the ancient god of fertility associated with the ancient city of Lampsacus near Troy.

=== Heraldry ===
Arms of Apprieu	Blazon: Party per Fesse, in first party per pale: 1 of Gules, a bee of Or; 2 of Gules, two keys the same posed saltirewise; in second Azure, a blast furnace proper masoned in Sable with open arch

== Administration ==
List of Successive Mayors

From	To	Name
2001	2008	Bernard Vial
2008	2014	Georges Ferreri
2014	2026	Dominique Pallier

== Demography ==
The inhabitants of the commune are known as Apprelans or Apprelanes in French.

Historical population

Year	Pop.	±% p.a.
1793	1,297	—
1800	1,439	+1.50%
1806	1,555	+1.30%
1821	1,469	−0.38%
1831	1,480	+0.07%
1836	1,478	−0.03%
1841	1,480	+0.03%
1846	1,811	+4.12%
1851	1,861	+0.55%
1856	1,821	−0.43%
1861	1,764	−0.63%
1866	1,766	+0.02%
1872	1,761	−0.05%
1876	1,893	+1.82%
1881	1,879	−0.15%
1886	1,841	−0.41%
1891	1,777	−0.71%
1896	1,790	+0.15%
1901	1,725	−0.74%

Year	Pop.	±% p.a.
1906	1,724	−0.01%
1911	1,704	−0.23%
1921	1,500	−1.27%
1926	1,588	+1.15%
1931	1,604	+0.20%
1936	1,483	−1.56%
1946	1,493	+0.07%
1954	1,541	+0.40%
1962	1,448	−0.78%
1968	1,478	+0.34%
1975	1,539	+0.58%
1982	1,770	+2.02%
1990	2,426	+4.02%
1999	2,528	+0.46%
2007	2,987	+2.11%
2012	3,154	+1.09%
2017	3,313	+0.99%
2023	3,615	+1.46%

Source: EHESS and INSEE

== Sites and Monuments ==
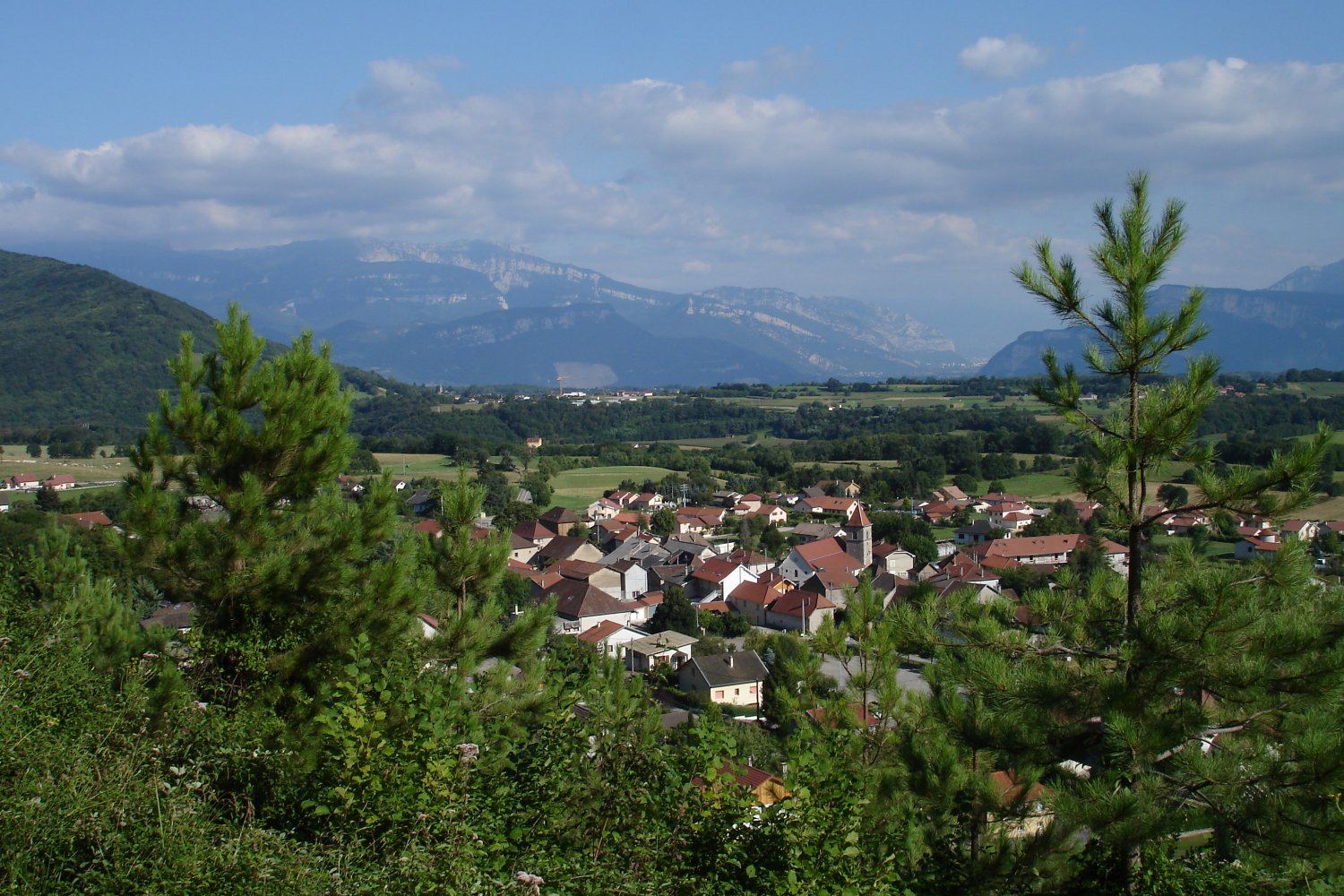
General view to the South-east

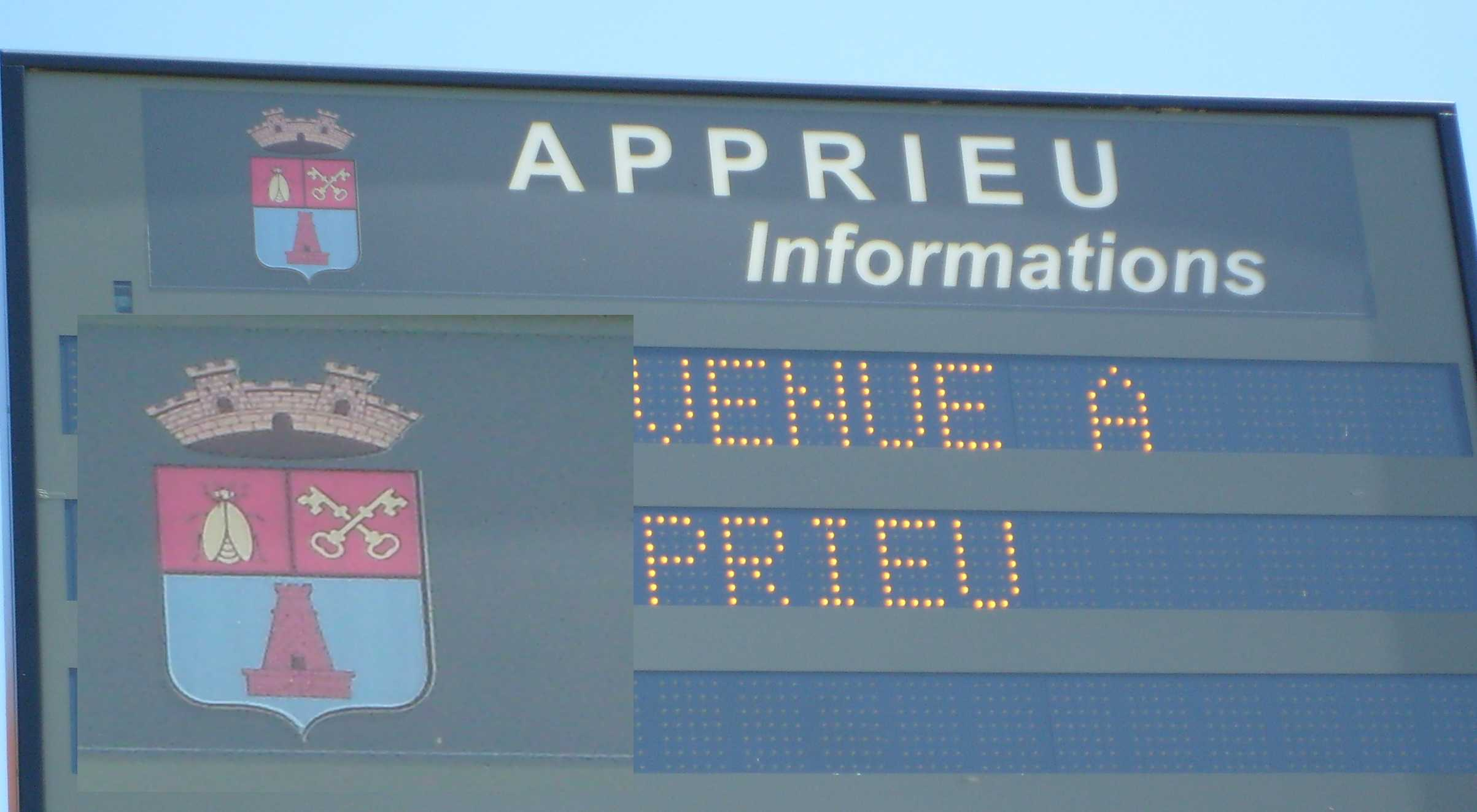
Information Sign

The Forges of Bonpertuis (1859) are registered as an historical monument.

== Notable people linked to the commune ==
The Gourju family settled in Apprieu in 1842 to restart the old forges of Bonpertuis known since 1569 and probably much earlier in the Carthusian period. Alphonse Gourju (ironmaster from Rives), Renage, and Brignoud from the valley of Gresivaudan installed a remarkable puddling furnace at Bonpertuis which is well preserved today. The tradition of ironworking was continued by the Experton family.

Canadian biathlete Yolaine Oddou emigrated to Canada from Apprieu in 1999.

== See also ==
- Communes of the Isère department
