= Izeaux =

- Commune
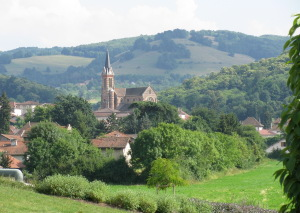
- A general view of Izeaux

- Coat of arms
- Location of Izeaux
- Location within France Location within Auvergne-Rhône-Alpes
- Coordinates: 45°20′07″N 5°25′30″E
- Country: France
- Region: Auvergne-Rhône-Alpes
- Department: Isère
- Arrondissement: Grenoble
- Canton: Le Grand-Lemps
- Intercommunality: Bièvre Est

Government
  - Mayor (2023–2026): Max Barbagallo
- Area^{1}: 15.54 km^{2} (6.00 sq mi)
- Highest elevation: 700 m (2,300 ft)
- Lowest elevation: 405 m (1,329 ft)
- Population (2023): 2,134
  - Density: 137.3/km^{2} (355.7/sq mi)
- Time zone: UTC+01:00 (CET)
  - Summer (DST): UTC+02:00 (CEST)
- INSEE/Postal code: 38194 /38140
- ^{1} French Land Register data, which excludes lakes, ponds, glaciers > 1 km^{2} (0.386 sq mi or 247 acres) and river estuaries.

Izeaux (French pronunciation: [izo]) is a commune in the Isère department in southeastern France.

== Population ==
Historical population

Year	Pop.	±% p.a.
1793	1,134	—
1800	1,212	+0.95%
1806	1,212	+0.00%
1821	1,344	+0.69%
1831	1,474	+0.93%
1836	1,555	+1.08%
1841	1,582	+0.34%
1846	1,706	+1.52%
1851	1,693	−0.15%
1856	1,675	−0.21%
1861	1,777	+1.19%
1866	1,811	+0.38%
1872	1,674	−1.30%
1876	1,684	+0.15%
1881	1,728	+0.52%
1886	1,864	+1.53%
1891	1,754	−1.21%
1896	1,901	+1.62%
1901	1,876	−0.26%

Year	Pop.	±% p.a.
1906	1,741	−1.48%
1911	1,708	−0.38%
1921	1,518	−1.17%
1926	1,603	+1.10%
1931	1,601	−0.02%
1936	1,524	−0.98%
1946	1,384	−0.96%
1954	1,430	+0.41%
1962	1,344	−0.77%
1968	1,353	+0.11%
1975	1,425	+0.74%
1982	1,511	+0.84%
1990	1,798	+2.20%
1999	1,810	+0.07%
2007	2,119	+1.99%
2012	2,123	+0.04%
2017	2,147	+0.23%
2023	2,134	−0.10%

Source: EHESS and INSEE (1968-2023)

== See also ==
- Communes of the Isère department
