= Chélieu =

- Commune
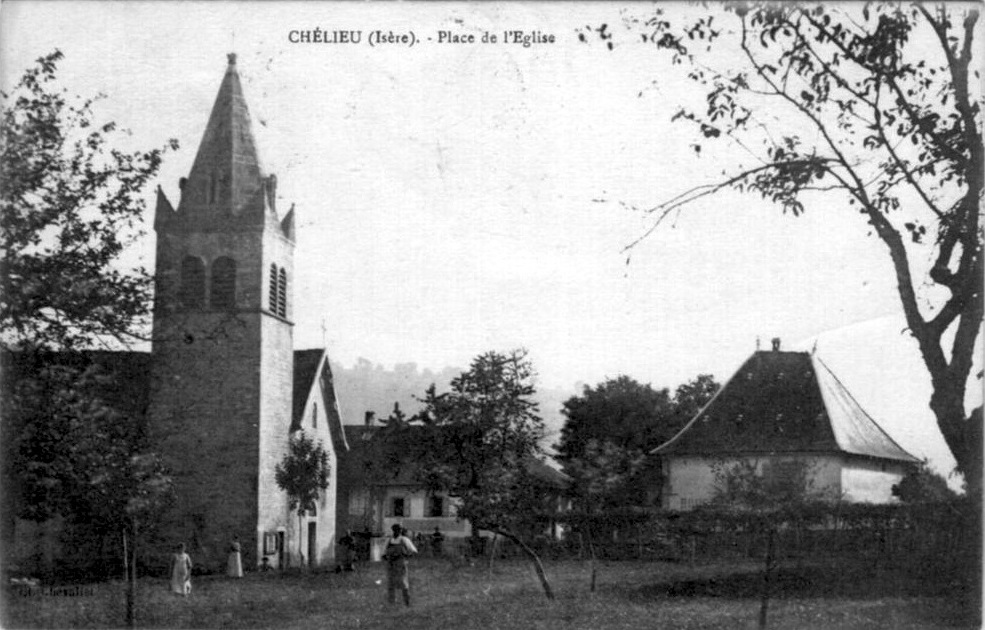
- The church at the start of the 20th century
- Location of Chélieu
- Location within France Location within Auvergne-Rhône-Alpes
- Coordinates: 45°30′46″N 5°28′36″E
- Country: France
- Region: Auvergne-Rhône-Alpes
- Department: Isère
- Arrondissement: La Tour-du-Pin
- Canton: Le Grand-Lemps
- Intercommunality: Les Vals du Dauphiné

Government
  - Mayor (2020–2026): Max Gauthier
- Area^{1}: 10.13 km^{2} (3.91 sq mi)
- Highest elevation: 607 m (1,991 ft)
- Lowest elevation: 374 m (1,227 ft)
- Population (2023): 733
  - Density: 72.4/km^{2} (187/sq mi)
- Time zone: UTC+01:00 (CET)
  - Summer (DST): UTC+02:00 (CEST)
- INSEE/Postal code: 38098 /38730
- ^{1} French Land Register data, which excludes lakes, ponds, glaciers > 1 km^{2} (0.386 sq mi or 247 acres) and river estuaries.

Chélieu (French pronunciation: [ʃeljø]) is a commune in the Isère department in southeastern France.

== Geography ==
The Bourbre flows northeast through the eastern part of the commune and forms part of its northeastern border.

== Population ==
Historical population
Year	Pop.	±% p.a.
1968	378	—
1975	323	−2.22%
1982	368	+1.88%
1990	415	+1.51%
1999	522	+2.58%
2007	642	+2.62%
2012	680	+1.16%
2017	676	−0.12%
2023	733	+1.36%
Source: INSEE

== See also ==
- Communes of the Isère department
