= Flachères =

- Commune
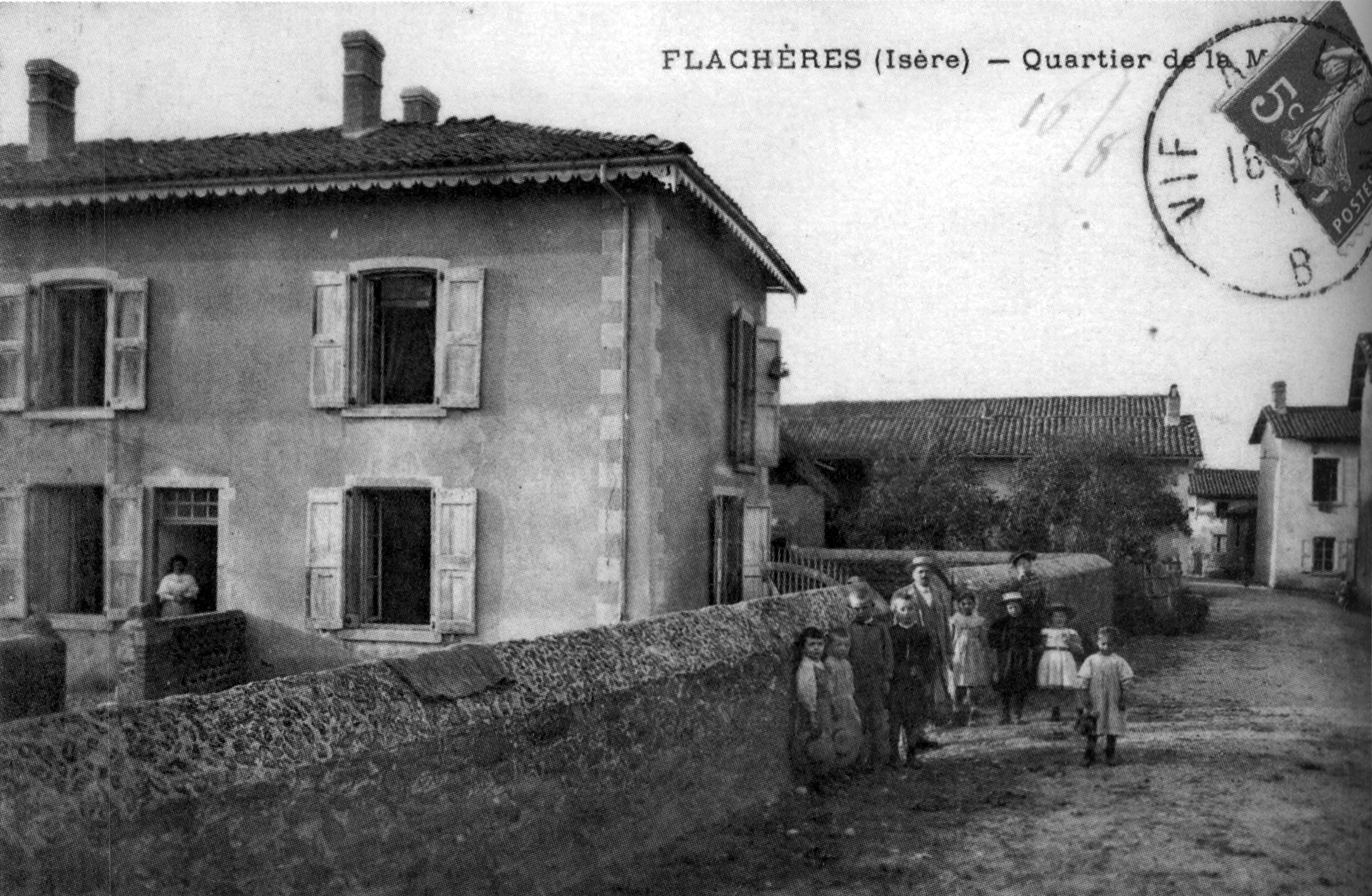
- Flachères in 1913

- Coat of arms
- Location of Flachères
- Location within France Location within Auvergne-Rhône-Alpes
- Coordinates: 45°28′15″N 5°18′51″E
- Country: France
- Region: Auvergne-Rhône-Alpes
- Department: Isère
- Arrondissement: La Tour-du-Pin
- Canton: Le Grand-Lemps
- Intercommunality: Bièvre Est

Government
  - Mayor (2020–2026): Cyrille Madinier
- Area^{1}: 5.94 km^{2} (2.29 sq mi)
- Elevation: 600 m (2,000 ft)
- Highest elevation: 641 m (2,103 ft)
- Lowest elevation: 530 m (1,740 ft)
- Population (2023): 579
  - Density: 97.5/km^{2} (252/sq mi)
- Time zone: UTC+01:00 (CET)
  - Summer (DST): UTC+02:00 (CEST)
- INSEE/Postal code: 38167 /38690
- ^{1} French Land Register data, which excludes lakes, ponds, glaciers > 1 km^{2} (0.386 sq mi or 247 acres) and river estuaries.

Flachères (French pronunciation: [flaʃɛʁ]) is a commune in the Isère department in southeastern France.

== Population ==
Historical population
Year	Pop.	±% p.a.
1968	221	—
1975	216	−0.33%
1982	226	+0.65%
1990	256	+1.57%
1999	301	+1.82%
2007	450	+5.16%
2012	510	+2.53%
2017	524	+0.54%
2023	579	+1.68%
Source: INSEE

== See also ==
- Communes of the Isère department
