= Longechenal =

- Commune
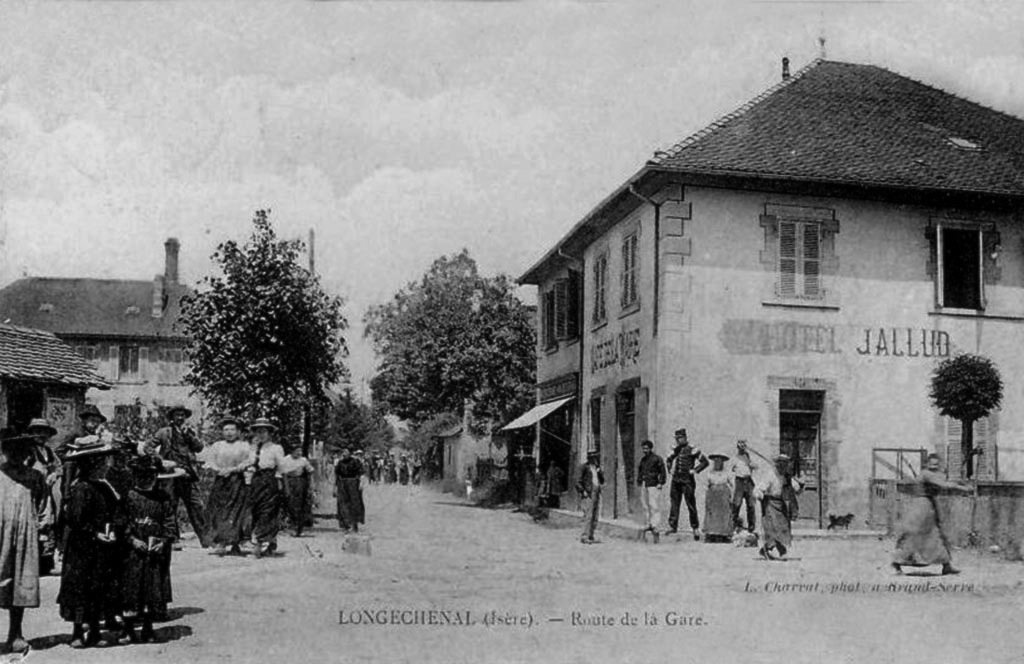
- Longechenal in the early 20th century
- Location of Longechenal
- Location within France Location within Auvergne-Rhône-Alpes
- Coordinates: 45°25′11″N 5°20′54″E
- Country: France
- Region: Auvergne-Rhône-Alpes
- Department: Isère
- Arrondissement: Vienne
- Canton: Le Grand-Lemps
- Intercommunality: Bièvre Isère

Government
  - Mayor (2020–2026): Charles Ferrand
- Area^{1}: 8.12 km^{2} (3.14 sq mi)
- Elevation: 498 m (1,634 ft)
- Highest elevation: 671 m (2,201 ft)
- Lowest elevation: 489 m (1,604 ft)
- Population (2023): 593
  - Density: 73.0/km^{2} (189/sq mi)
- Time zone: UTC+01:00 (CET)
  - Summer (DST): UTC+02:00 (CEST)
- INSEE/Postal code: 38213 /38690
- ^{1} French Land Register data, which excludes lakes, ponds, glaciers > 1 km^{2} (0.386 sq mi or 247 acres) and river estuaries.

Longechenal (French pronunciation: [lɔ̃ʒʃənal]) is a commune in the Isère department in southeastern France.

== Population ==
Historical population
Year	Pop.	±% p.a.
1968	382	—
1975	384	+0.07%
1982	385	+0.04%
1990	417	+1.00%
1999	428	+0.29%
2007	483	+1.52%
2012	585	+3.91%
2017	571	−0.48%
2023	593	+0.63%
Source: INSEE

== See also ==
- Communes of the Isère department
