= Janneyrias =

- Commune
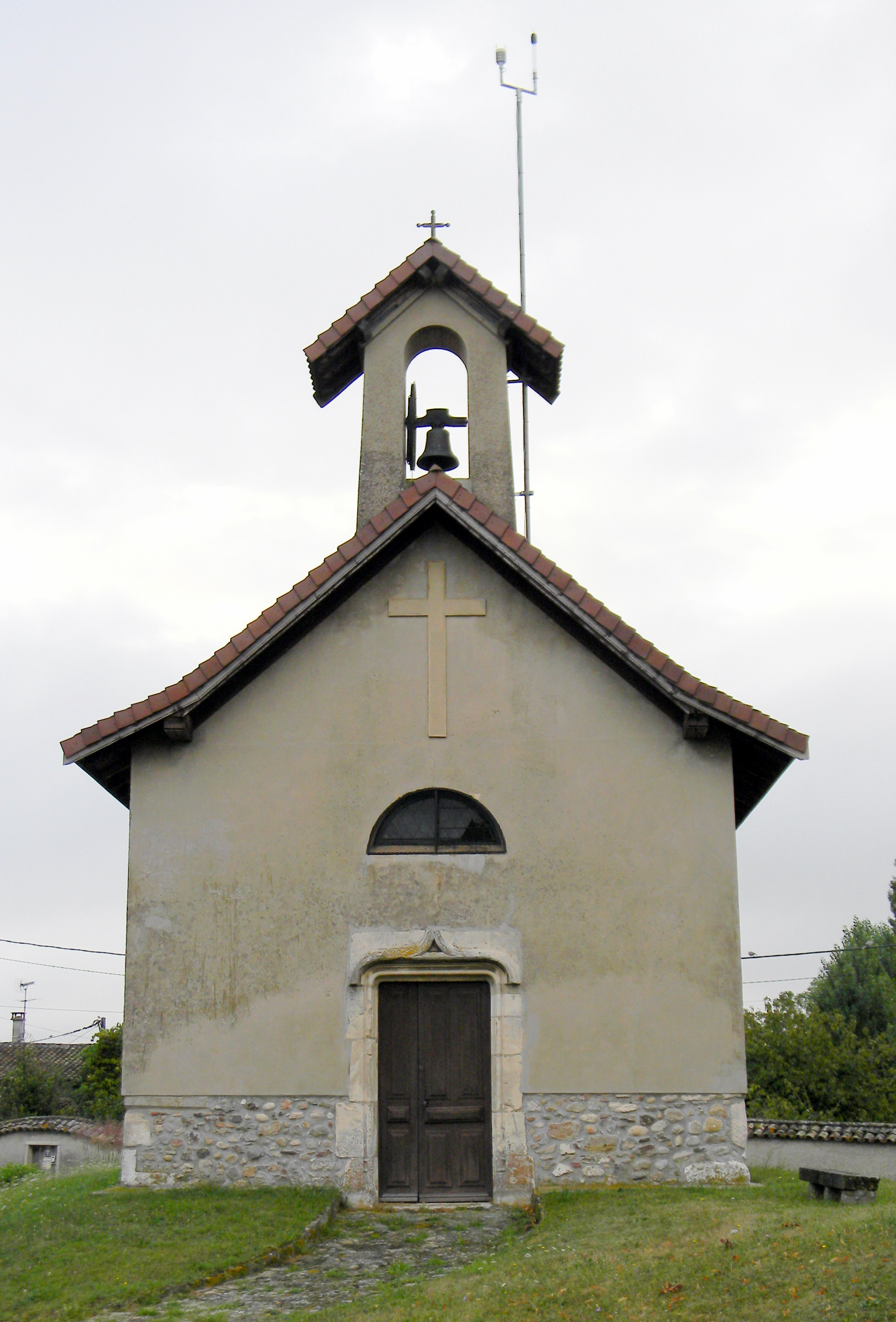
- The chapel of Saint-Ours, in Janneyrias

- Coat of arms
- Location of Janneyrias
- Location within France Location within Auvergne-Rhône-Alpes
- Coordinates: 45°45′10″N 5°06′45″E
- Country: France
- Region: Auvergne-Rhône-Alpes
- Department: Isère
- Arrondissement: La Tour-du-Pin
- Canton: Charvieu-Chavagneux

Government
  - Mayor (2020–2026): Jean-Louis Turmaud
- Area^{1}: 10.52 km^{2} (4.06 sq mi)
- Elevation: 220 m (720 ft)
- Highest elevation: 287 m (942 ft)
- Lowest elevation: 213 m (699 ft)
- Population (2023): 1,896
  - Density: 180.2/km^{2} (466.8/sq mi)
- Time zone: UTC+01:00 (CET)
  - Summer (DST): UTC+02:00 (CEST)
- INSEE/Postal code: 38197 /38280
- ^{1} French Land Register data, which excludes lakes, ponds, glaciers > 1 km^{2} (0.386 sq mi or 247 acres) and river estuaries.

Janneyrias (French pronunciation: [ʒaneʁja]) is a commune in the Isère department in southeastern France.

== Population ==
Historical population
Year	Pop.	±% p.a.
1968	738	—
1975	768	+0.57%
1982	917	+2.57%
1990	1,018	+1.31%
1999	1,168	+1.54%
2007	1,407	+2.35%
2012	1,544	+1.88%
2017	1,829	+3.45%
2023	1,896	+0.60%
Source: INSEE

== See also ==
- Communes of the Isère department
