= Communes of the Isère department =

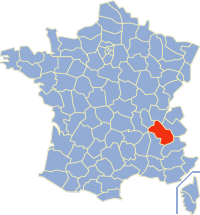

The following is a list of the 512 communes in the French department of Isère.

The communes cooperate in the following intercommunalities (as of 2025):

- Grenoble-Alpes Métropole
- Communauté d'agglomération du Pays Voironnais
- Communauté d'agglomération Porte de l'Isère
- Communauté d'agglomération Vienne Condrieu (partly)
- Communauté de communes Les Balcons du Dauphiné
- Communauté de communes de Bièvre Est
- Communauté de communes Bièvre Isère
- Communauté de communes Cœur de Chartreuse (partly)
- CC Collines Isère Nord Communauté
- Communauté de communes Entre Bièvre et Rhône
- Communauté de communes Le Grésivaudan
- Communauté de communes Lyon Saint-Exupéry en Dauphiné
- Communauté de communes du Massif du Vercors
- Communauté de communes de la Matheysine
- Communauté de communes de l'Oisans
- CC Saint-Marcellin Vercors Isère Communauté
- Communauté de communes du Trièves
- Communauté de communes Les Vals du Dauphiné

INSEE code	Postal code	Commune
38001	38490	Les Abrets-en-Dauphiné
38002	38190	Les Adrets
38003	38150	Agnin
38004	38470	L'Albenc
38005	38114	Allemond
38006	38580	Allevard
38008	38970	Ambel
38009	38150	Anjou
38010	38460	Annoisin-Chatelans
38011	38280	Anthon
38012	38490	Aoste
38013	38140	Apprieu
38297	38510	Arandon-Passins
38015	38440	Artas
38017	38150	Assieu
38018	38680	Auberives-en-Royans
38019	38550	Auberives-sur-Varèze
38020	38142	Auris
38225	38112	Autrans-Méaudre-en-Vercors
38022	38630	Les Avenières-Veyrins-Thuellin
38023	38650	Avignonet
38026	38390	La Balme-les-Grottes
38027	38530	Barraux
38029	38110	La Bâtie-Montgascon
38030	38140	Beaucroissant
38031	38970	Beaufin
38032	38270	Beaufort
38033	38470	Beaulieu
38034	38270	Beaurepaire
38035	38440	Beauvoir-de-Marc
38036	38160	Beauvoir-en-Royans
38037	38270	Bellegarde-Poussieu
38038	38690	Belmont
38039	38190	Bernin
38040	38142	Besse
38041	38160	Bessins
38042	38690	Bévenais
38043	38850	Bilieu
38044	38690	Biol
38045	38330	Biviers
38046	38690	Bizonnes
38047	38730	Blandin
38048	38090	Bonnefamille
38049	38260	Bossieu
38050	38510	Le Bouchage
38051	38150	Bougé-Chambalud
38052	38520	Le Bourg-d'Oisans
38053	38300	Bourgoin-Jallieu
38054	38390	Bouvesse-Quirieu
38055	38510	Brangues
38056	38870	Bressieux
38057	38320	Bresson
38058	38590	Brézins
38059	38320	Brié-et-Angonnes
38060	38590	Brion
38061	38500	La Buisse
38062	38530	La Buissière
38063	38690	Burcin
38064	38110	Cessieu
38065	38690	Châbons
38066	38122	Chalon
38067	38460	Chamagnieu
38068	38800	Champagnier
38069	38260	Champier
38070	38190	Le Champ-près-Froges
38071	38560	Champ-sur-Drac
38567	38410	Chamrousse
38072	38150	Chanas
38073	38740	Chantepérier
38074	38470	Chantesse
38075	38530	Chapareillan
38076	38110	La Chapelle-de-la-Tour
38077	38150	La Chapelle-de-Surieu
38078	38580	La Chapelle-du-Bard
38080	38490	Charancieu
38081	38790	Charantonnay
38082	38850	Charavines
38083	38390	Charette
38084	38140	Charnècles
38085	38230	Charvieu-Chavagneux
38086	38470	Chasselay
38087	38670	Chasse-sur-Rhône
38089	38730	Chassignieu
38090	38650	Château-Bernard
38091	38300	Châteauvilain
38456	38710	Châtel-en-Trièves
38092	38680	Châtelus
38093	38980	Châtenay
38094	38440	Châtonnay
38095	38160	Chatte
38097	38230	Chavanoz
38098	38730	Chélieu
38099	38160	Chevrières
38100	38570	Le Cheylas
38101	38550	Cheyssieu
38102	38300	Chèzeneuve
38103	38930	Chichilianne
38104	38490	Chimilin
38105	38850	Chirens
38106	38220	Cholonge
38107	38121	Chonas-l'Amballan
38108	38680	Choranche
38109	38460	Chozeau
38110	38200	Chuzelles
38111	38640	Claix
38112	38142	Clavans-en-Haut-Oisans
38113	38930	Clelles
38114	38550	Clonas-sur-Varèze
38116	38350	Cognet
38117	38470	Cognin-les-Gorges
38118	38690	Colombe
38120	38190	La Combe-de-Lancey
38124	38630	Corbelin
38126	38700	Corenc
38127	38710	Cornillon-en-Trièves
38128	38970	Corps
38129	38250	Corrençon-en-Vercors
38130	38260	La Côte-Saint-André
38131	38138	Les Côtes-d'Arey
38132	38970	Les Côtes-de-Corps
38133	38500	Coublevie
38134	38122	Cour-et-Buis
38135	38510	Courtenay
38136	38300	Crachier
38137	38210	Cras
38138	38460	Crémieu
38439	38830	Crêts-en-Belledonne
38139	38510	Creys-Mépieu
38140	38920	Crolles
38141	38300	Culin
38253	38860	Les Deux Alpes
38144	38790	Diémoz
38146	38460	Dizimieu
38147	38730	Doissin
38148	38110	Dolomieu
38149	38300	Domarin
38150	38420	Domène
38151	38130	Échirolles
38152	38300	Eclose-Badinières
38153	38360	Engins
38154	38740	Entraigues
38155	38380	Entre-deux-Guiers
38156	38300	Les Éparres
38157	38780	Estrablin
38158	38320	Eybens
38159	38690	Eydoche
38160	38780	Eyzin-Pinet
38161	38260	Faramans
38162	38110	Faverges-de-la-Tour
38166	38530	La Flachère
38167	38690	Flachères
38169	38600	Fontaine
38170	38120	Fontanil-Cornillon
38171	38590	La Forteresse
38172	38080	Four
38173	38142	Le Freney-d'Oisans
38174	38260	La Frette
38175	38190	Froges
38176	38290	Frontonas
38177	38520	La Garde
38179	38610	Gières
38180	38260	Gillonnay
38181	38570	Goncelin
38182	38690	Le Grand-Lemps
38183	38490	Granieu
38184	38540	Grenay
38185	38000	Grenoble
38186	38650	Gresse-en-Vercors
38187	38450	Le Gua
38163	38580	Le Haut-Bréda
38188	38320	Herbeys
38189	38540	Heyrieux
38190	38118	Hières-sur-Amby
38191	38750	Huez
38192	38570	Hurtières
38193	38080	L'Isle-d'Abeau
38194	38140	Izeaux
38195	38160	Izeron
38197	38280	Janneyrias
38198	38270	Jarcieu
38199	38200	Jardin
38200	38560	Jarrie
38203	38220	Laffrey
38204	38930	Lalley
38205	38250	Lans-en-Vercors
38207	38350	Lavaldens
38206	38190	Laval-en-Belledonne
38208	38710	Lavars
38209	38270	Lentiol
38210	38460	Leyrieu
38211	38440	Lieudieu
38212	38220	Livet-et-Gavet
38213	38690	Longechenal
38214	38660	Lumbin
38215	38200	Luzinay
38216	38470	Malleval-en-Vercors
38217	38350	Marcieu
38218	38260	Marcilloles
38219	38270	Marcollin
38221	38980	Marnans
38222	38620	Massieu
38223	38300	Maubec
38224	38350	Mayres-Savel
38226	38710	Mens
38228	38620	Merlas
38229	38240	Meylan
38230	38300	Meyrié
38231	38440	Meyrieu-les-Étangs
38232	38440	Meyssiez
38235	38450	Miribel-Lanchâtre
38236	38380	Miribel-les-Échelles
38237	38142	Mizoën
38238	38440	Moidieu-Détourbe
38239	38430	Moirans
38240	38270	Moissieu-sur-Dolon
38241	38970	Monestier-d'Ambel
38242	38650	Monestier-de-Clermont
38243	38930	Le Monestier-du-Percy
38244	38122	Monsteroux-Milieu
38245	38160	Montagne
38246	38110	Montagnieu
38247	38390	Montalieu-Vercieu
38248	38210	Montaud
38249	38330	Montbonnot-Saint-Martin
38250	38890	Montcarra
38252	38220	Montchaboud
38254	38770	Monteynard
38255	38940	Montfalcon
38256	38620	Montferrat
38257	38690	Montrevel
38258	38120	Mont-Saint-Martin
38259	38122	Montseveroux
38260	38460	Moras
38261	38510	Morestel
38263	38210	Morette
38264	38350	La Morte
38265	38770	La Motte-d'Aveillans
38266	38770	La Motte-Saint-Martin
38267	38260	Mottier
38268	38580	Le Moutaret
38269	38350	La Mure
38270	38140	La Murette
38271	38420	Murianette
38272	38160	Murinais
38273	38350	Nantes-en-Ratier
38276	38300	Nivolas-Vermelle
38277	38450	Notre-Dame-de-Commiers
38278	38470	Notre-Dame-de-l'Osier
38279	38220	Notre-Dame-de-Mésage
38280	38144	Notre-Dame-de-Vaulx
38281	38360	Noyarey
38282	38460	Optevoz
38283	38350	Oris-en-Rattier
38284	38260	Ornacieux-Balbins
38285	38520	Ornon
38286	38520	Oulles
38287	38690	Oyeu
38288	38780	Oytier-Saint-Oblas

INSEE code	Postal code	Commune
38289	38114	Oz
38290	38270	Pact
38291	38260	Pajay
38294	38460	Panossas
38295	38390	Parmilieu
38296	38490	Le Passage
38298	38550	Le Péage-de-Roussillon
38299	38970	Pellafol
38300	38260	Penol
38301	38930	Percy
38303	38570	La Pierre
38304	38119	Pierre-Châtel
38307	38270	Pisieu
38308	38590	Plan
38395	38660	Plateau-des-Petites-Roches
38309	38320	Poisat
38310	38210	Poliénas
38311	38260	Pommier-de-Beaurepaire
38313	38350	Ponsonnas
38314	38530	Pontcharra
38315	38480	Le Pont-de-Beauvoisin
38316	38230	Pont-de-Chéruy
38317	38800	Le Pont-de-Claix
38319	38680	Pont-en-Royans
38318	38780	Pont-Évêque
38320	38390	Porcieu-Amblagnieu
38479	38260	Porte-des-Bonnevaux
38321	38710	Prébois
38322	38680	Presles
38323	38480	Pressins
38324	38270	Primarette
38325	38120	Proveysieux
38326	38350	Prunières
38328	38950	Quaix-en-Chartreuse
38329	38970	Quet-en-Beaumont
38330	38470	Quincieu
38331	38140	Réaumont
38332	38140	Renage
38333	38680	Rencurel
38334	38420	Revel
38335	38270	Revel-Tourdan
38336	38121	Reventin-Vaugris
38337	38140	Rives
38338	38210	La Rivière
38339	38090	Roche
38340	38370	Les Roches-de-Condrieu
38341	38110	Rochetoirin
38342	38650	Roissard
38343	38480	Romagnieu
38344	38150	Roussillon
38345	38470	Rovon
38346	38440	Royas
38347	38940	Roybon
38348	38300	Ruy-Montceau
38349	38550	Sablons
38351	38300	Saint-Agnin-sur-Bion
38352	38080	Saint-Alban-de-Roche
38353	38370	Saint-Alban-du-Rhône
38354	38480	Saint-Albin-de-Vaulserre
38355	38650	Saint-Andéol
38356	38680	Saint-André-en-Royans
38357	38490	Saint-André-le-Gaz
38359	38160	Saint-Antoine-l'Abbaye
38360	38160	Saint-Appolinard
38361	38350	Saint-Arey
38362	38960	Saint-Aupre
38363	38270	Saint-Barthélemy
38364	38220	Saint-Barthélemy-de-Séchilienne
38365	38118	Saint-Baudille-de-la-Tour
38366	38710	Saint-Baudille-et-Pipet
38368	38140	Saint-Blaise-du-Buis
38370	38840	Saint-Bonnet-de-Chavagne
38372	38620	Saint-Bueil
38373	38500	Saint-Cassien
38374	38890	Saint-Chef
38375	38520	Saint-Christophe-en-Oisans
38376	38380	Saint-Christophe-sur-Guiers
38377	38110	Saint-Clair-de-la-Tour
38378	38370	Saint-Clair-du-Rhône
38379	38940	Saint-Clair-sur-Galaure
38380	38690	Saint-Didier-de-Bizonnes
38381	38110	Saint-Didier-de-la-Tour
38350	38190	Sainte-Agnès
38358	38440	Sainte-Anne-sur-Gervonde
38369	38110	Sainte-Blandine
38382	38120	Saint-Égrève
38414	38970	Sainte-Luce
38417	38660	Sainte-Marie-d'Alloix
38418	38660	Sainte-Marie-du-Mont
38383	38960	Saint-Étienne-de-Crossey
38384	38590	Saint-Étienne-de-Saint-Geoirs
38386	38620	Saint-Geoire-en-Valdaine
38387	38590	Saint-Geoirs
38388	38450	Saint-Georges-de-Commiers
38389	38790	Saint-Georges-d'Espéranche
38390	38470	Saint-Gervais
38391	38650	Saint-Guillaume
38392	38460	Saint-Hilaire-de-Brens
38393	38260	Saint-Hilaire-de-la-Côte
38394	38840	Saint-Hilaire-du-Rosier
38396	38350	Saint-Honoré
38397	38330	Saint-Ismier
38398	38480	Saint-Jean-d'Avelanne
38399	38440	Saint-Jean-de-Bournay
38400	38430	Saint-Jean-de-Moirans
38401	38110	Saint-Jean-de-Soudain
38402	38220	Saint-Jean-de-Vaulx
38403	38710	Saint-Jean-d'Hérans
38404	38420	Saint-Jean-le-Vieux
38405	38134	Saint-Joseph-de-Rivière
38406	38122	Saint-Julien-de-l'Herms
38408	38540	Saint-Just-Chaleyssin
38409	38680	Saint-Just-de-Claix
38410	38840	Saint-Lattier
38412	38380	Saint-Laurent-du-Pont
38413	38350	Saint-Laurent-en-Beaumont
38415	38080	Saint-Marcel-Bel-Accueil
38416	38160	Saint-Marcellin
38419	38930	Saint-Martin-de-Clelles
38115	38650	Saint-Martin-de-la-Cluze
38420	38480	Saint-Martin-de-Vaulserre
38421	38400	Saint-Martin-d'Hères
38422	38410	Saint-Martin-d'Uriage
38423	38950	Saint-Martin-le-Vinoux
38424	38930	Saint-Maurice-en-Trièves
38425	38550	Saint-Maurice-l'Exil
38426	38530	Saint-Maximin
38427	38590	Saint-Michel-de-Saint-Geoirs
38428	38350	Saint-Michel-en-Beaumont
38429	38650	Saint-Michel-les-Portes
38430	38190	Saint-Mury-Monteymond
38431	38330	Saint-Nazaire-les-Eymes
38432	38500	Saint-Nicolas-de-Macherin
38433	38250	Saint-Nizier-du-Moucherotte
38434	38490	Saint-Ondras
38436	38760	Saint-Paul-de-Varces
38437	38140	Saint-Paul-d'Izeaux
38438	38650	Saint-Paul-lès-Monestier
38440	38870	Saint-Pierre-de-Bressieux
38442	38380	Saint-Pierre-de-Chartreuse
38443	38160	Saint-Pierre-de-Chérennes
38444	38350	Saint-Pierre-de-Méaroz
38445	38220	Saint-Pierre-de-Mésage
38446	73670	Saint-Pierre-d'Entremont
38448	38370	Saint-Prim
38449	38070	Saint-Quentin-Fallavier
38450	38210	Saint-Quentin-sur-Isère
38451	38460	Saint-Romain-de-Jalionas
38452	38150	Saint-Romain-de-Surieu
38453	38160	Saint-Romans
38454	38160	Saint-Sauveur
38455	38300	Saint-Savin
38457	38870	Saint-Siméon-de-Bressieux
38458	38510	Saint-Sorlin-de-Morestel
38459	38200	Saint-Sorlin-de-Vienne
38460	38620	Saint-Sulpice-des-Rivoires
38462	38119	Saint-Théoffrey
38463	38160	Saint-Vérand
38464	38110	Saint-Victor-de-Cessieu
38465	38510	Saint-Victor-de-Morestel
38466	38660	Saint-Vincent-de-Mercuze
38467	38890	Salagnon
38468	38150	Salaise-sur-Sanne
38469	38970	La Salette-Fallavaux
38470	38350	La Salle-en-Beaumont
38471	38700	Le Sappey-en-Chartreuse
38472	38700	Sarcenas
38473	38260	Sardieu
38474	38360	Sassenage
38475	38290	Satolas-et-Bonce
38476	38440	Savas-Mépin
38478	38220	Séchilienne
38480	38780	Septème
38481	38300	Sérézin-de-la-Tour
38483	38510	Sermérieu
38484	38200	Serpaize
38275	38470	Serre-Nerpol
38485	38170	Seyssinet-Pariset
38486	38180	Seyssins
38487	38200	Seyssuel
38488	38460	Siccieu-Saint-Julien-et-Carisieu
38489	38350	Siévoz
38490	38590	Sillans
38492	38650	Sinard
38494	38460	Soleymieu
38495	38840	La Sône
38496	38150	Sonnay
38497	38350	Sousville
38498	38300	Succieu
38407	38134	La Sure en Chartreuse
38499	38350	Susville
38500	38470	Têche
38501	38570	Tencin
38503	38660	La Terrasse
38504	38570	Theys
38505	38260	Thodure
38507	38230	Tignieu-Jameyzieu
38508	38690	Torchefelon
38509	38110	La Tour-du-Pin
38511	38660	Le Touvet
38512	38300	Tramolé
38513	38650	Treffort
38514	38710	Tréminis
38515	38460	Trept
38516	38700	La Tronche
38517	38210	Tullins
38518	38740	Valbonnais
38560	38730	Val-de-Virieu
38519	38540	Valencin
38520	38730	Valencogne
38521	38350	La Valette
38522	38740	Valjouffrey
38523	38470	Varacieux
38524	38760	Varces-Allières-et-Risset
38525	38890	Vasselin
38526	38470	Vatilieu
38527	38114	Vaujany
38528	38410	Vaulnaveys-le-Bas
38529	38410	Vaulnaveys-le-Haut
38530	38090	Vaulx-Milieu
38531	38620	Velanne
38532	38460	Vénérieu
38533	38610	Venon
38535	38460	Vernas
38536	38150	Vernioz
38537	38290	La Verpillière
38538	38420	Le Versoud
38539	38390	Vertrieu
38540	38113	Veurey-Voroize
38542	38460	Veyssilieu
38543	38510	Vézeronce-Curtin
38544	38200	Vienne
38545	38450	Vif
38546	38890	Vignieu
38292	38850	Villages du Lac de Paladru
38547	38190	Villard-Bonnot
38548	38250	Villard-de-Lans
38549	38520	Villard-Notre-Dame
38550	38114	Villard-Reculas
38551	38520	Villard-Reymond
38552	38119	Villard-Saint-Christophe
38553	38090	Villefontaine
38554	38460	Villemoirieu
38555	38440	Villeneuve-de-Marc
38556	38150	Ville-sous-Anjou
38557	38280	Villette-d'Anthon
38558	38200	Villette-de-Vienne
38559	38470	Vinay
38561	38980	Viriville
38562	38220	Vizille
38563	38500	Voiron
38564	38620	Voissant
38565	38340	Voreppe
38566	38210	Vourey
