= Chassignieu =

- Commune
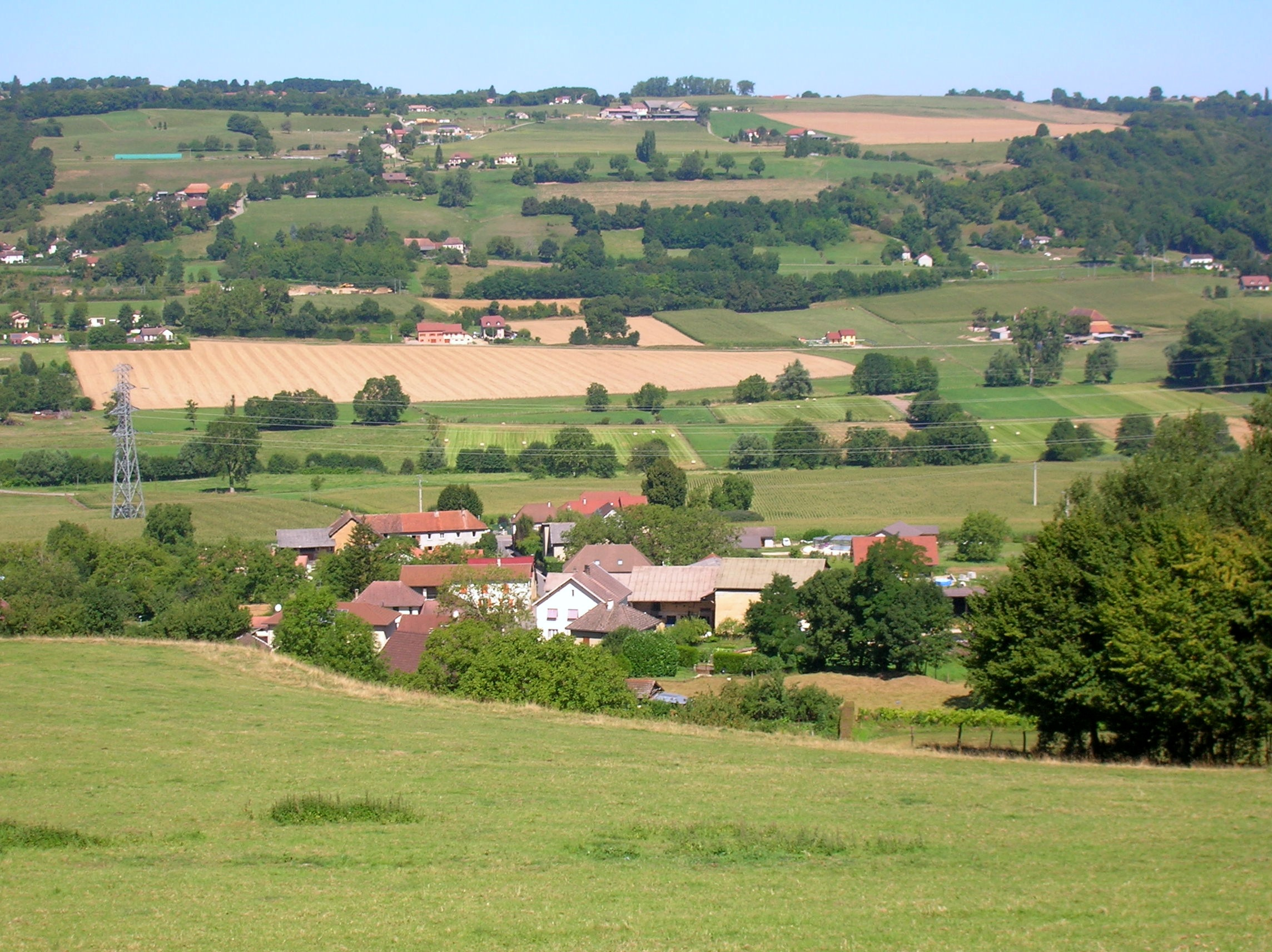
- A general view of Chassignieu
- Location of Chassignieu
- Location within France Location within Auvergne-Rhône-Alpes
- Coordinates: 45°30′04″N 5°30′19″E
- Country: France
- Region: Auvergne-Rhône-Alpes
- Department: Isère
- Arrondissement: La Tour-du-Pin
- Canton: Le Grand-Lemps

Government
  - Mayor (2020–2026): Jean-Marc Bouvet
- Area^{1}: 5.17 km^{2} (2.00 sq mi)
- Highest elevation: 607 m (1,991 ft)
- Lowest elevation: 373 m (1,224 ft)
- Population (2023): 225
  - Density: 43.5/km^{2} (113/sq mi)
- Time zone: UTC+01:00 (CET)
  - Summer (DST): UTC+02:00 (CEST)
- INSEE/Postal code: 38089 /38730
- ^{1} French Land Register data, which excludes lakes, ponds, glaciers > 1 km^{2} (0.386 sq mi or 247 acres) and river estuaries.

Chassignieu (French pronunciation: [ʃasiɲø]) is a commune in the Isère department in southeastern France.

== Geography ==
The Bourbre forms the commune's northwestern border. There is an old and abandoned castle next to the village, the Château de Bellegarde.

== Population ==
Historical population
Year	Pop.	±% p.a.
1968	239	—
1975	198	−2.65%
1982	190	−0.59%
1990	188	−0.13%
1999	192	+0.23%
2007	201	+0.57%
2012	202	+0.10%
2017	232	+2.81%
2023	225	−0.51%
Source: INSEE

== See also ==
- Communes of the Isère department
