= Frontonas =

- Commune
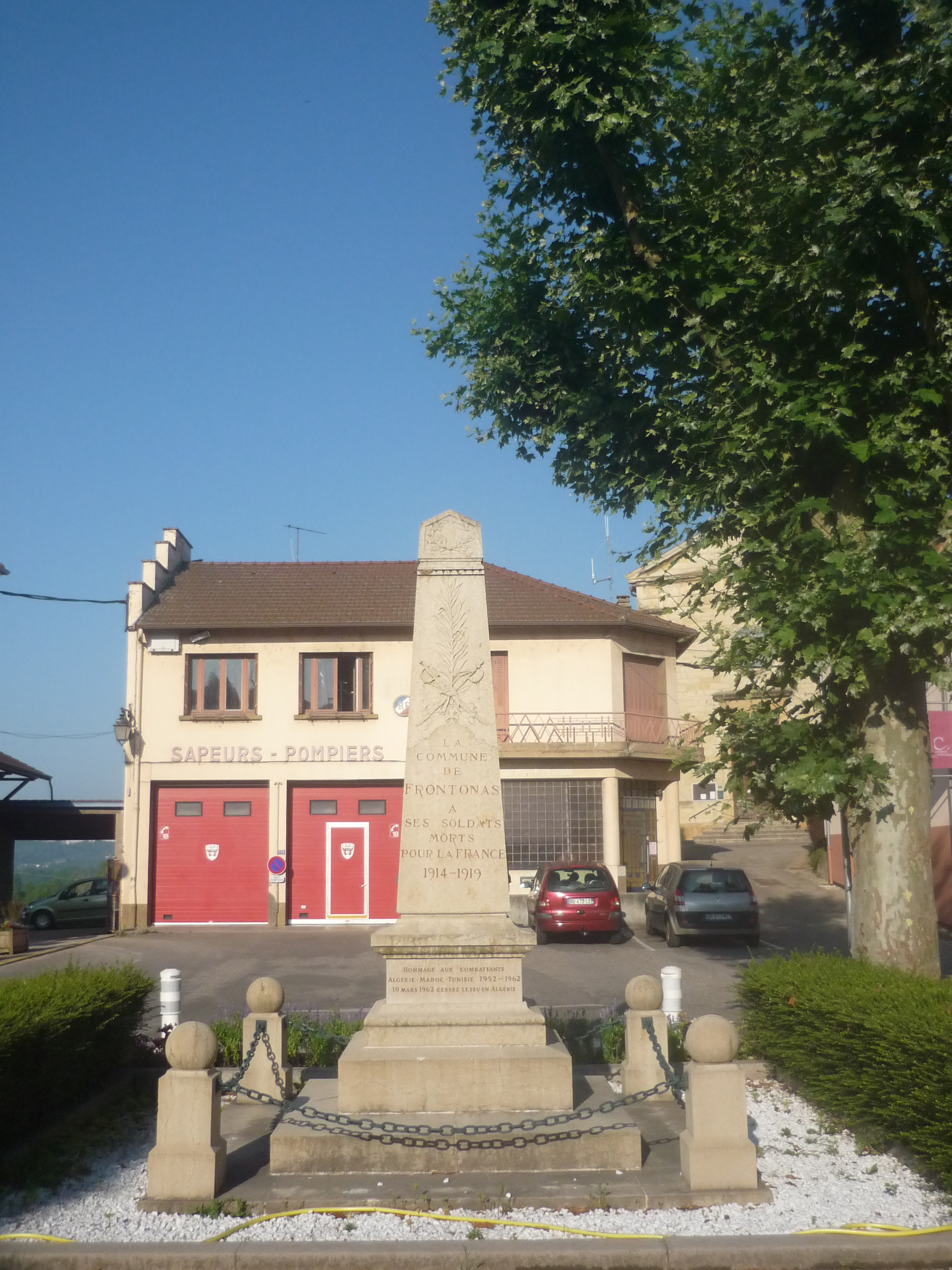
- War memorial and fire station
- Location of Frontonas
- Location within France Location within Auvergne-Rhône-Alpes
- Coordinates: 45°38′59″N 5°11′05″E
- Country: France
- Region: Auvergne-Rhône-Alpes
- Department: Isère
- Arrondissement: La Tour-du-Pin
- Canton: La Verpillière

Government
  - Mayor (2020–2026): Annick Merle
- Area^{1}: 12.65 km^{2} (4.88 sq mi)
- Elevation: 230 m (750 ft)
- Highest elevation: 401 m (1,316 ft)
- Lowest elevation: 207 m (679 ft)
- Population (2023): 2,123
  - Density: 167.8/km^{2} (434.7/sq mi)
- Time zone: UTC+01:00 (CET)
  - Summer (DST): UTC+02:00 (CEST)
- INSEE/Postal code: 38176 /38290
- ^{1} French Land Register data, which excludes lakes, ponds, glaciers > 1 km^{2} (0.386 sq mi or 247 acres) and river estuaries.

Frontonas is a commune in the Isère department in southeastern France.

== Population ==
Historical population

Year	Pop.	±% p.a.
1793	625	—
1800	650	+0.56%
1806	575	−2.02%
1821	751	+1.80%
1831	958	+2.46%
1836	989	+0.64%
1841	1,064	+1.47%
1846	1,055	−0.17%
1851	1,100	+0.84%
1856	1,135	+0.63%
1861	1,157	+0.38%
1866	1,182	+0.43%
1872	1,137	−0.64%
1876	1,080	−1.28%
1881	1,061	−0.35%
1886	978	−1.62%
1891	965	−0.27%
1896	938	−0.57%
1901	905	−0.71%

Year	Pop.	±% p.a.
1906	840	−1.48%
1911	748	−2.29%
1921	712	−0.49%
1926	715	+0.08%
1931	691	−0.68%
1936	678	−0.38%
1946	695	+0.25%
1954	667	−0.51%
1962	757	+1.59%
1968	711	−1.04%
1975	927	+3.86%
1982	1,129	+2.86%
1990	1,379	+2.53%
1999	1,714	+2.45%
2007	1,829	+0.82%
2012	1,956	+1.35%
2017	2,069	+1.13%
2023	2,123	+0.43%

Source: EHESS and INSEE (1968-2023)

== See also ==
- Communes of the Isère department
