= Montrevel, Isère =

Montrevel
- Commune
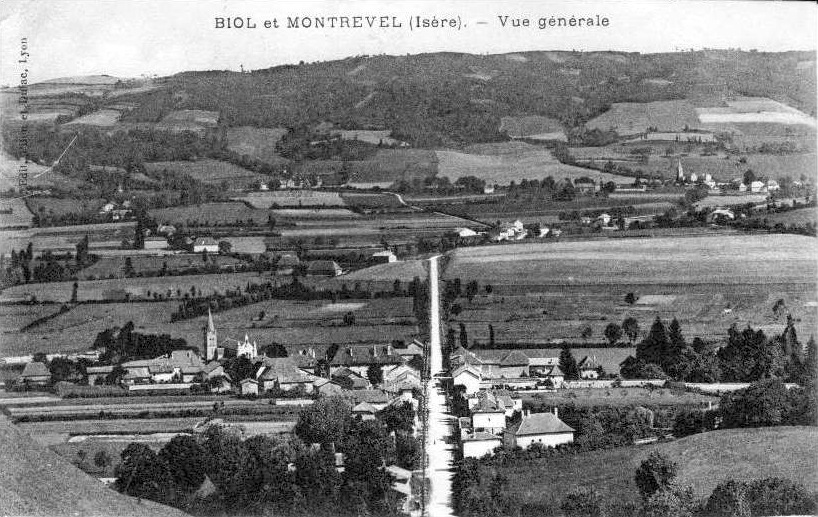
- Biol and Montrevel in 1912
- Location of Montrevel
- Location within France Location within Auvergne-Rhône-Alpes
- Coordinates: 45°28′47″N 5°24′10″E
- Country: France
- Region: Auvergne-Rhône-Alpes
- Department: Isère
- Arrondissement: La Tour-du-Pin
- Canton: Le Grand-Lemps

Government
  - Mayor (2020–2026): Daniel Vitte
- Area^{1}: 9.37 km^{2} (3.62 sq mi)
- Elevation: 510 m (1,670 ft)
- Highest elevation: 705 m (2,313 ft)
- Lowest elevation: 441 m (1,447 ft)
- Population (2023): 452
  - Density: 48.2/km^{2} (125/sq mi)
- Time zone: UTC+01:00 (CET)
  - Summer (DST): UTC+02:00 (CEST)
- INSEE/Postal code: 38257 /38690
- ^{1} French Land Register data, which excludes lakes, ponds, glaciers > 1 km^{2} (0.386 sq mi or 247 acres) and river estuaries.

Montrevel is a commune in the Isère department in southeastern France.

== Population ==
Historical population
Year	Pop.	±% p.a.
1968	245	—
1975	246	+0.06%
1982	233	−0.77%
1990	262	+1.48%
1999	346	+3.14%
2007	452	+3.40%
2012	465	+0.57%
2017	451	−0.61%
2023	452	+0.04%
Source: INSEE

== See also ==
- Communes of the Isère department
