= Saint-Ondras =

- Commune
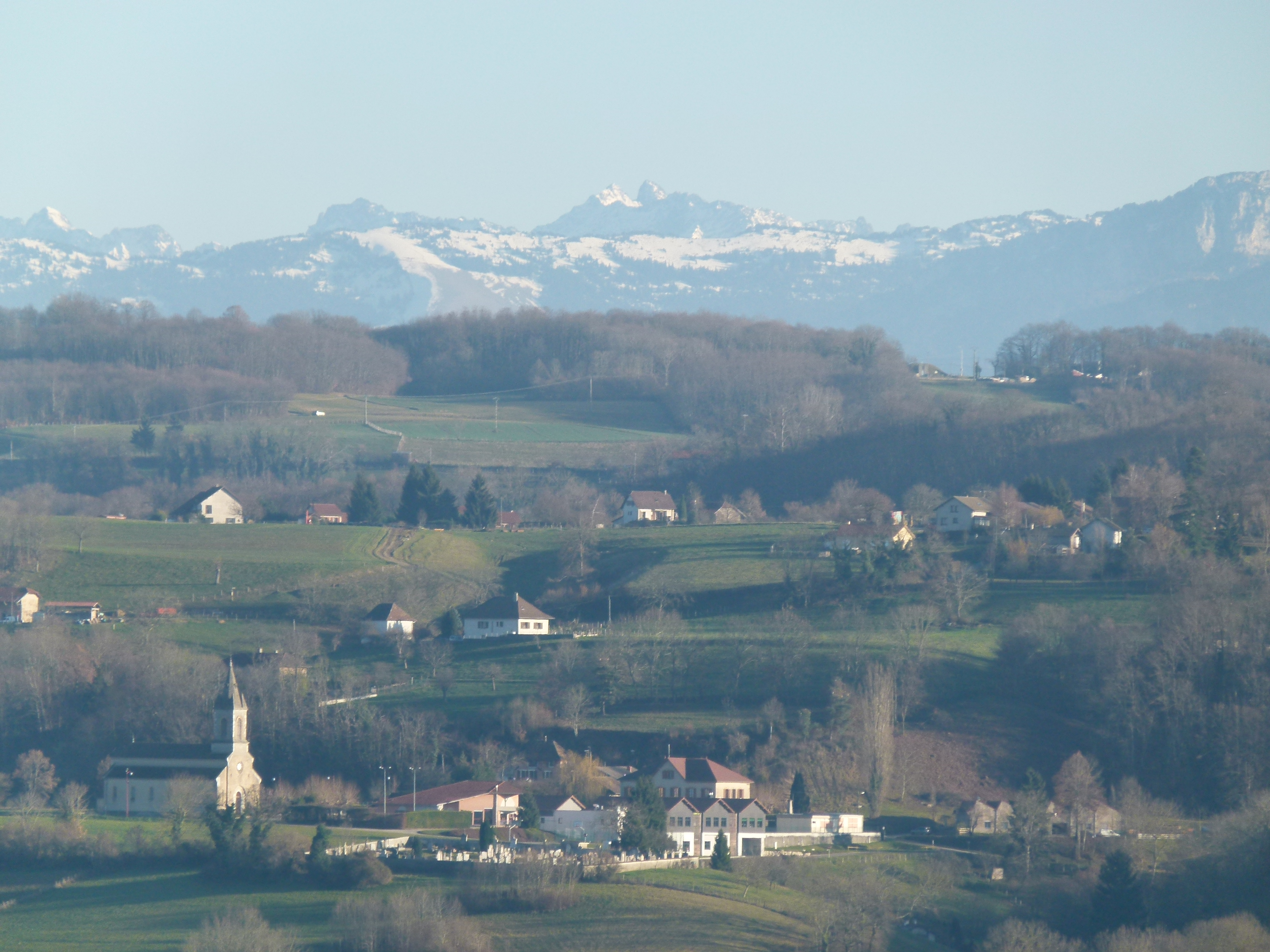
- A general view of Saint-Ondras
- Location of Saint-Ondras
- Location within France Location within Auvergne-Rhône-Alpes
- Coordinates: 45°31′07″N 5°32′52″E
- Country: France
- Region: Auvergne-Rhône-Alpes
- Department: Isère
- Arrondissement: La Tour-du-Pin
- Canton: Le Grand-Lemps

Government
  - Mayor (2022–2026): Michel Cleyet-Merle
- Area^{1}: 8.15 km^{2} (3.15 sq mi)
- Elevation: 410 m (1,350 ft)
- Highest elevation: 626 m (2,054 ft)
- Lowest elevation: 361 m (1,184 ft)
- Population (2023): 668
  - Density: 82.0/km^{2} (212/sq mi)
- Time zone: UTC+01:00 (CET)
  - Summer (DST): UTC+02:00 (CEST)
- INSEE/Postal code: 38434 /38490
- ^{1} French Land Register data, which excludes lakes, ponds, glaciers > 1 km^{2} (0.386 sq mi or 247 acres) and river estuaries.

Saint-Ondras is a commune in the Isère department in southeastern France.

== Population ==
Historical population
Year	Pop.	±% p.a.
1968	336	—
1975	307	−1.28%
1982	362	+2.38%
1990	478	+3.54%
1999	496	+0.41%
2007	567	+1.69%
2012	612	+1.54%
2017	640	+0.90%
2023	668	+0.72%
Source: INSEE

== Geography ==
The Bourbre forms the commune's northwestern border.

== See also ==
- Communes of the Isère department
