= Optevoz =

- Commune
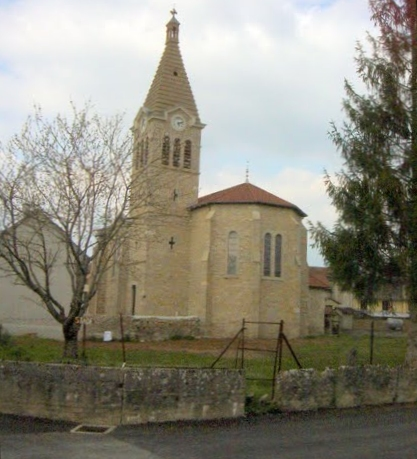
- The church of Optevoz
- Location of Optevoz
- Location within France Location within Auvergne-Rhône-Alpes
- Coordinates: 45°45′10″N 5°19′56″E
- Country: France
- Region: Auvergne-Rhône-Alpes
- Department: Isère
- Arrondissement: La Tour-du-Pin
- Canton: Morestel
- Intercommunality: Les Balcons du Dauphiné

Government
  - Mayor (2020–2026): Joseph Quiles
- Area^{1}: 12 km^{2} (4.6 sq mi)
- Highest elevation: 415 m (1,362 ft)
- Lowest elevation: 280 m (920 ft)
- Population (2023): 875
  - Density: 73/km^{2} (190/sq mi)
- Time zone: UTC+01:00 (CET)
  - Summer (DST): UTC+02:00 (CEST)
- INSEE/Postal code: 38282 /38460
- ^{1} French Land Register data, which excludes lakes, ponds, glaciers > 1 km^{2} (0.386 sq mi or 247 acres) and river estuaries.

Optevoz (French pronunciation: [ɔptəvo]) is a commune in the Isère department in southeastern France.

== Toponymy ==
As with many polysyllabic Arpitan toponyms or anthroponyms, the final -x marks oxytonic stress (on the last syllable), whereas the final -z indicates paroxytonic stress (on the penultimate syllable) and should not be pronounced, although in French it is often mispronounced due to hypercorrection.

== Population ==
Historical population
Year	Pop.	±% p.a.
1968	263	—
1975	260	−0.16%
1982	334	+3.64%
1990	455	+3.94%
1999	530	+1.71%
2007	664	+2.86%
2012	785	+3.40%
2017	843	+1.44%
2023	875	+0.62%
Source: INSEE

== See also ==
- Communes of the Isère department
