= Saint-Martin-de-Vaulserre =

- Commune
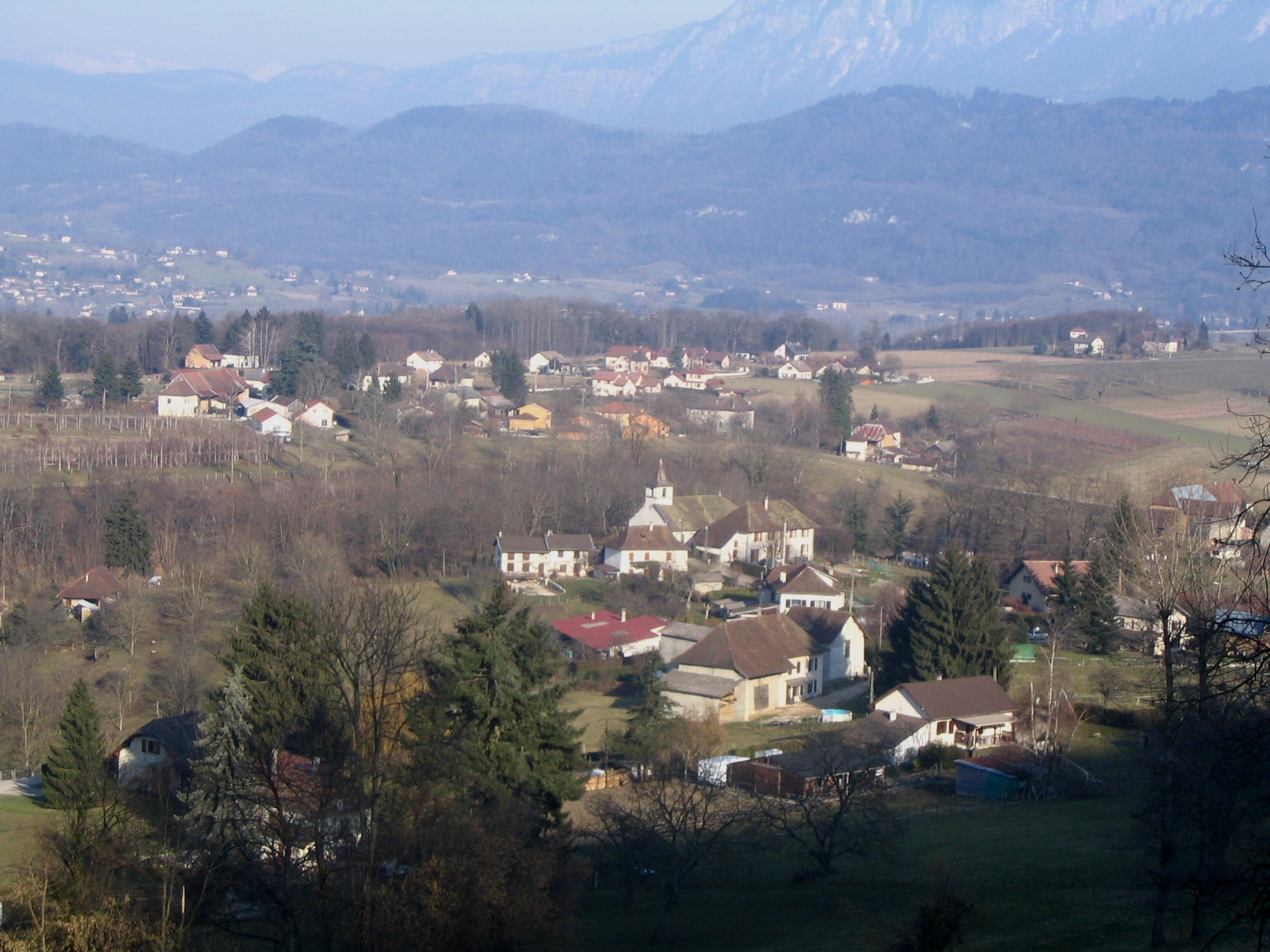
- A general view of Saint-Martin-de-Vaulserre
- Location of Saint-Martin-de-Vaulserre
- Location within France Location within Auvergne-Rhône-Alpes
- Coordinates: 45°29′41″N 5°41′00″E
- Country: France
- Region: Auvergne-Rhône-Alpes
- Department: Isère
- Arrondissement: La Tour-du-Pin
- Canton: Chartreuse-Guiers

Government
  - Mayor (2020–2026): Michel Reynaud
- Area^{1}: 3.92 km^{2} (1.51 sq mi)
- Elevation: 320 m (1,050 ft)
- Highest elevation: 584 m (1,916 ft)
- Lowest elevation: 320 m (1,050 ft)
- Population (2023): 246
  - Density: 62.8/km^{2} (163/sq mi)
- Time zone: UTC+01:00 (CET)
  - Summer (DST): UTC+02:00 (CEST)
- INSEE/Postal code: 38420 /38480
- ^{1} French Land Register data, which excludes lakes, ponds, glaciers > 1 km^{2} (0.386 sq mi or 247 acres) and river estuaries.

Saint-Martin-de-Vaulserre (French pronunciation: [sɛ̃ maʁtɛ̃ də volsɛʁ]) is a commune in the Isère department in southeastern France.

== Population ==
Historical population
Year	Pop.	±% p.a.
1968	164	—
1975	134	−2.84%
1982	155	+2.10%
1990	191	+2.64%
1999	208	+0.95%
2007	227	+1.10%
2012	255	+2.35%
2017	260	+0.39%
2023	246	−0.92%
Source: INSEE

== See also ==
- Communes of the Isère department
