= Vasselin =

- Commune
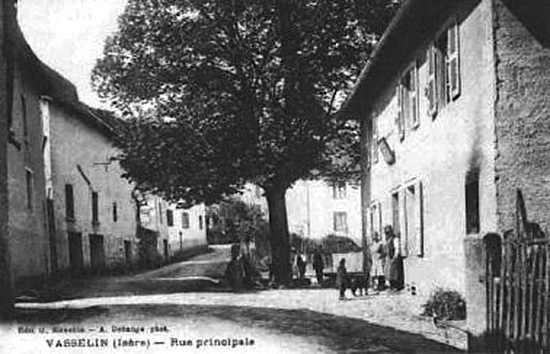
- Vasselin at the start of the 20th century

- Coat of arms
- Location of Vasselin
- Location within France Location within Auvergne-Rhône-Alpes
- Coordinates: 45°37′54″N 5°27′18″E
- Country: France
- Region: Auvergne-Rhône-Alpes
- Department: Isère
- Arrondissement: La Tour-du-Pin
- Canton: Morestel

Government
  - Mayor (2020–2026): Jean-Yves Roux
- Area^{1}: 3.85 km^{2} (1.49 sq mi)
- Elevation: 267 m (876 ft)
- Highest elevation: 450 m (1,480 ft)
- Lowest elevation: 221 m (725 ft)
- Population (2023): 458
  - Density: 119/km^{2} (308/sq mi)
- Time zone: UTC+01:00 (CET)
  - Summer (DST): UTC+02:00 (CEST)
- INSEE/Postal code: 38525 /38890
- ^{1} French Land Register data, which excludes lakes, ponds, glaciers > 1 km^{2} (0.386 sq mi or 247 acres) and river estuaries.

Vasselin (French pronunciation: [vaslɛ̃]) is a commune in the Isère department in southeastern France.

== Population ==
Historical population
Year	Pop.	±% p.a.
1968	160	—
1975	171	+0.95%
1982	202	+2.41%
1990	239	+2.12%
1999	300	+2.56%
2007	383	+3.10%
2012	469	+4.13%
2017	474	+0.21%
2023	458	−0.57%
Source: INSEE

== See also ==
- Communes of the Isère department
