= Bévenais =

- Commune
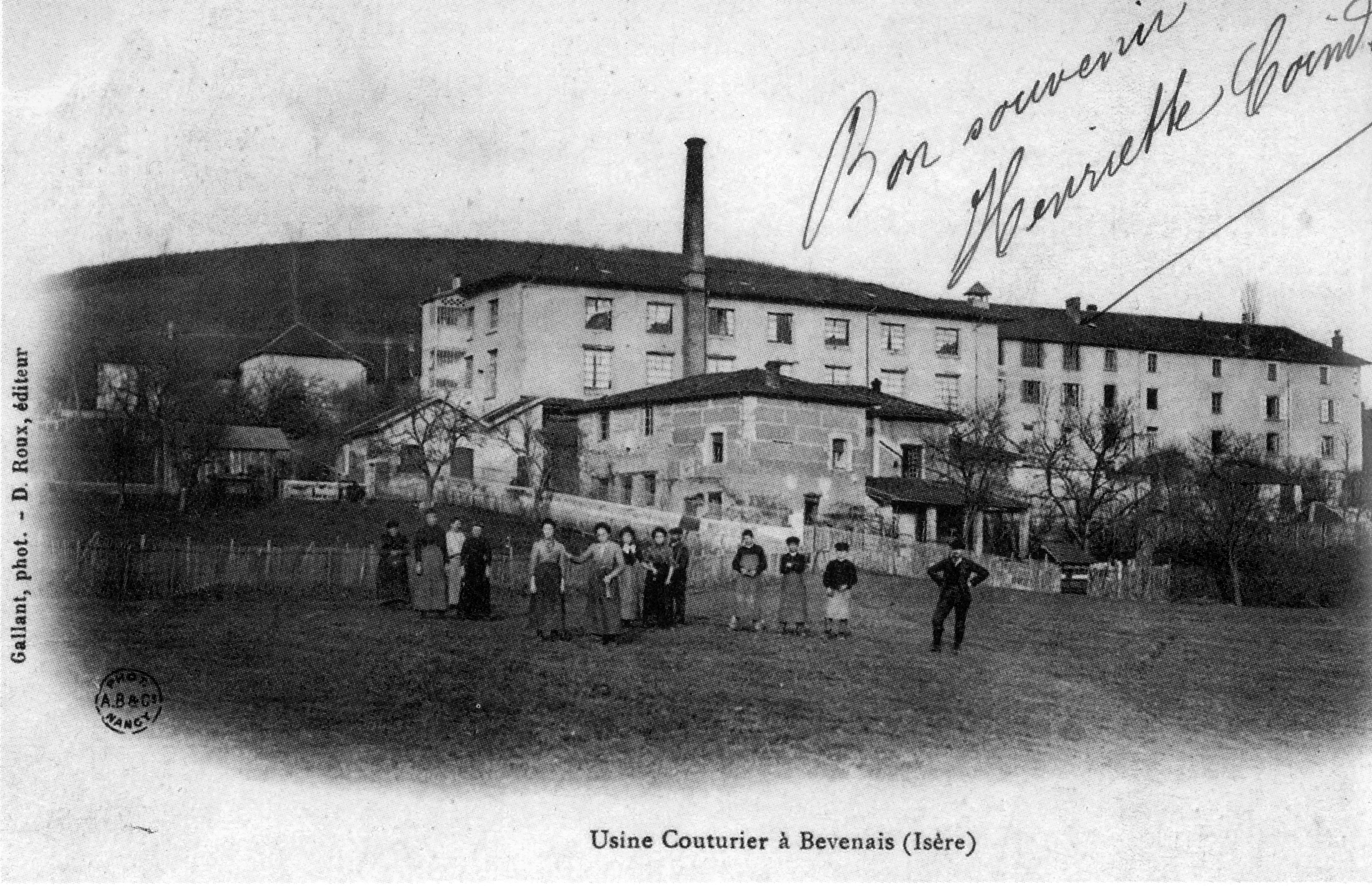
- A clothes factory in 1904
- Location of Bévenais
- Location within France Location within Auvergne-Rhône-Alpes
- Coordinates: 45°23′56″N 5°23′25″E
- Country: France
- Region: Auvergne-Rhône-Alpes
- Department: Isère
- Arrondissement: La Tour-du-Pin
- Canton: Le Grand-Lemps

Government
  - Mayor (2020–2026): Pierre Caron
- Area^{1}: 14.08 km^{2} (5.44 sq mi)
- Elevation: 436 m (1,430 ft)
- Highest elevation: 705 m (2,313 ft)
- Lowest elevation: 426 m (1,398 ft)
- Population (2023): 1,049
  - Density: 74.50/km^{2} (193.0/sq mi)
- Time zone: UTC+01:00 (CET)
  - Summer (DST): UTC+02:00 (CEST)
- INSEE/Postal code: 38042 /38690
- ^{1} French Land Register data, which excludes lakes, ponds, glaciers > 1 km^{2} (0.386 sq mi or 247 acres) and river estuaries.

Bévenais (French pronunciation: [bevnɛ]) is a commune in the Isère department in southeastern France.

== Population ==
Historical population
Year	Pop.	±% p.a.
1968	456	—
1975	435	−0.67%
1982	598	+4.65%
1990	628	+0.61%
1999	641	+0.23%
2007	827	+3.24%
2012	954	+2.90%
2017	1,008	+1.11%
2023	1,049	+0.67%
Source: INSEE

== See also ==
- Communes of the Isère department
