= Blandin =

- Commune
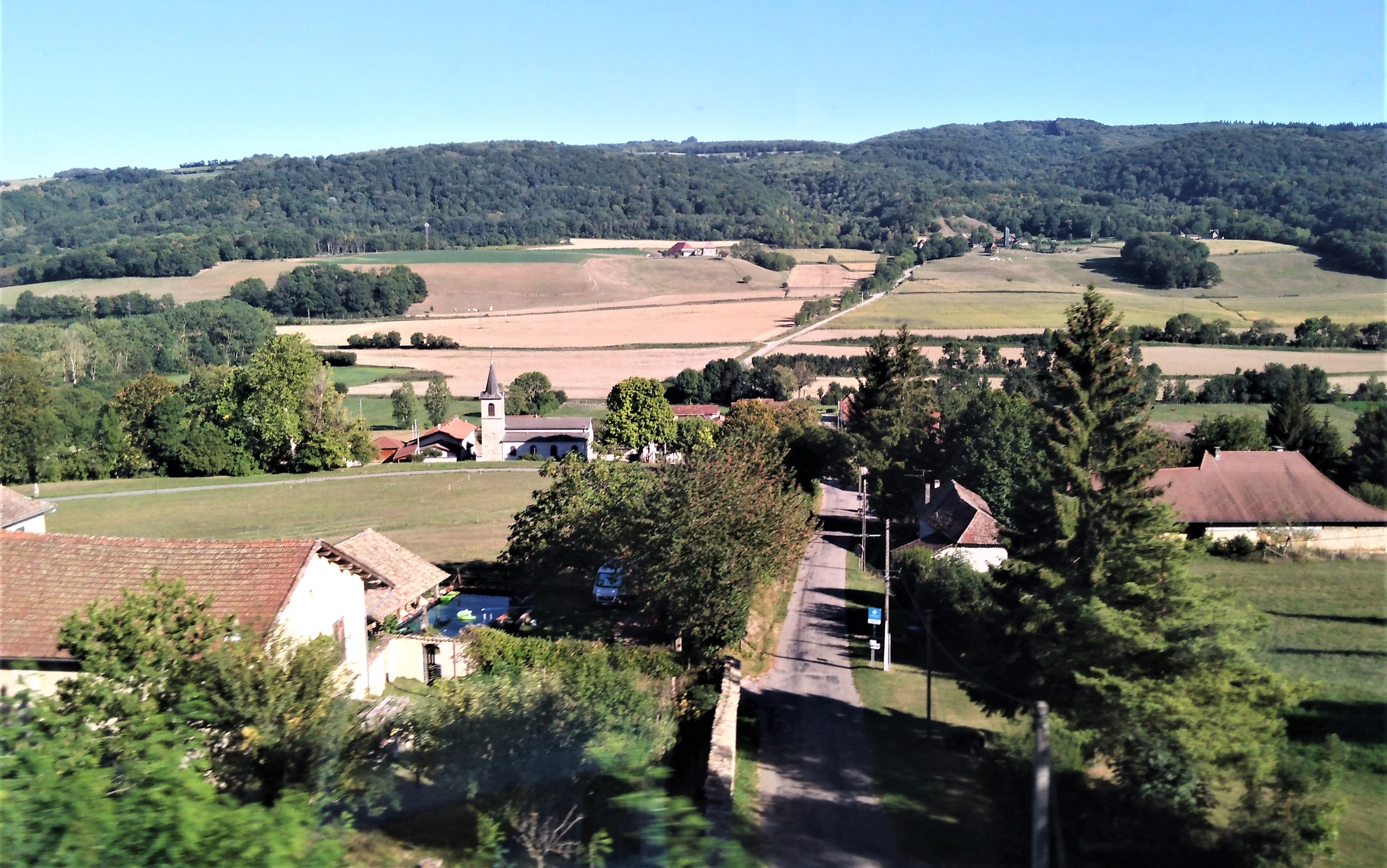
- A view of Blandin
- Location of Blandin
- Location within France Location within Auvergne-Rhône-Alpes
- Coordinates: 45°28′15″N 5°26′53″E
- Country: France
- Region: Auvergne-Rhône-Alpes
- Department: Isère
- Arrondissement: La Tour-du-Pin
- Canton: Le Grand-Lemps

Government
  - Mayor (2020–2026): Corinne Magnin
- Area^{1}: 4.26 km^{2} (1.64 sq mi)
- Elevation: 410 m (1,350 ft)
- Highest elevation: 664 m (2,178 ft)
- Lowest elevation: 387 m (1,270 ft)
- Population (2023): 158
  - Density: 37.1/km^{2} (96.1/sq mi)
- Time zone: UTC+01:00 (CET)
  - Summer (DST): UTC+02:00 (CEST)
- INSEE/Postal code: 38047 /38730
- ^{1} French Land Register data, which excludes lakes, ponds, glaciers > 1 km^{2} (0.386 sq mi or 247 acres) and river estuaries.

Blandin (French pronunciation: [blɑ̃dɛ̃]) is a commune in the Isère department in the Auvergne-Rhône-Alpes region in Southeastern France.

== Geography ==
Blandin was established in 1801 from Virieu. Blandin is located 25 km (15.5 mi) from Voiron and 14 km (8.6 mi) from La Tour-du-Pin. The Bourbre forms the commune's eastern border.

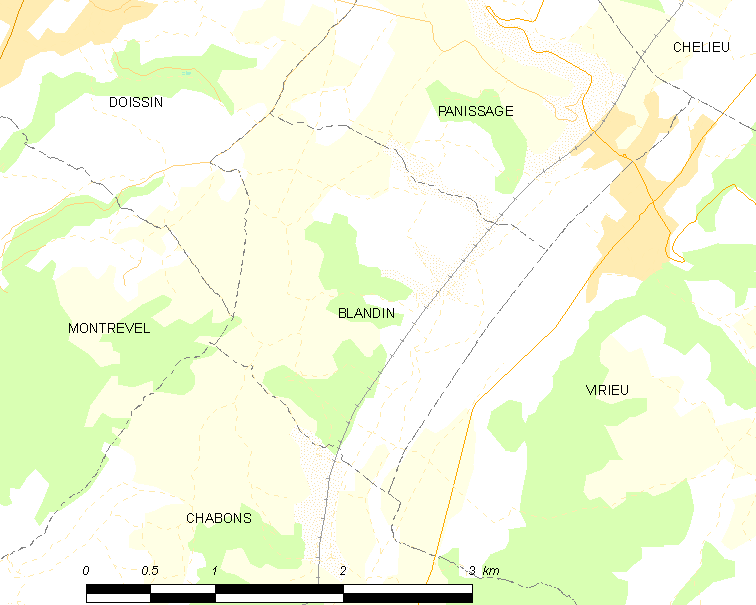
Map of the commune

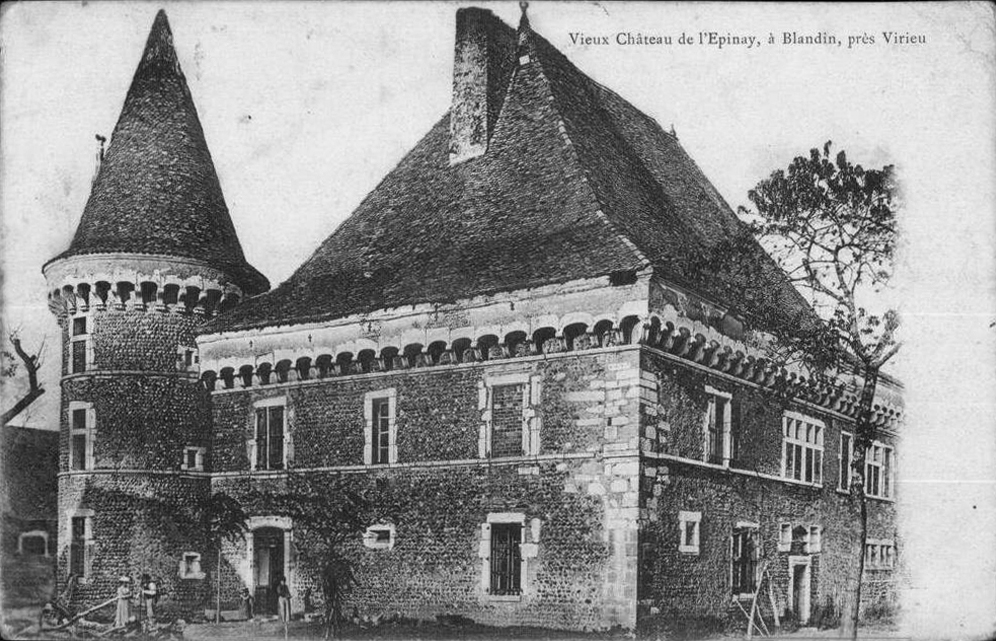
Château de l'Épinay in 1905

== Population ==
Its inhabitants are known as Blandinois (masculine) and Blandinoises (feminine) in French.

Historical population

Year	Pop.	±% p.a.
1800	162	—
1821	209	+1.22%
1846	217	+0.15%
1872	226	+0.16%
1901	180	−0.78%
1926	152	−0.67%
1946	143	−0.30%
1962	139	−0.18%
1968	144	+0.59%

Year	Pop.	±% p.a.
1975	117	−2.92%
1982	124	+0.83%
1990	133	+0.88%
1999	122	−0.95%
2007	147	+2.36%
2012	135	−1.69%
2017	145	+1.44%
2023	158	+1.44%

Source: EHESS and INSEE (1968–2023)

== See also ==
- Communes of the Isère department
