= Belmont, Isère =

Belmont
- Commune
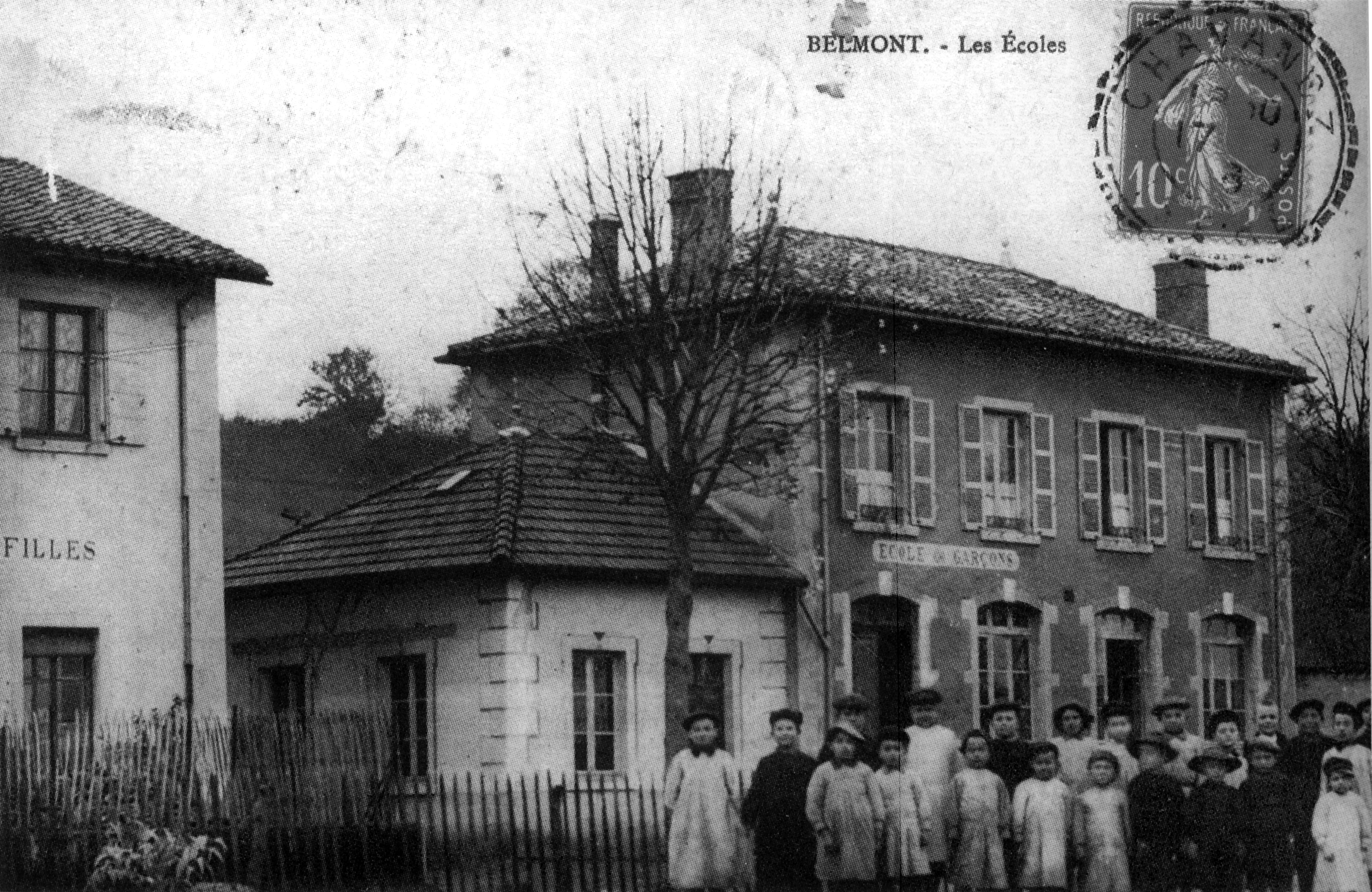
- The schools in 1910
- Location of Belmont
- Location within France Location within Auvergne-Rhône-Alpes
- Coordinates: 45°28′28″N 5°21′52″E
- Country: France
- Region: Auvergne-Rhône-Alpes
- Department: Isère
- Arrondissement: La Tour-du-Pin
- Canton: Le Grand-Lemps

Government
  - Mayor (2023–2026): Bernard Evrard
- Area^{1}: 6.51 km^{2} (2.51 sq mi)
- Elevation: 550 m (1,800 ft)
- Highest elevation: 662 m (2,172 ft)
- Lowest elevation: 455 m (1,493 ft)
- Population (2023): 636
  - Density: 97.7/km^{2} (253/sq mi)
- Time zone: UTC+01:00 (CET)
  - Summer (DST): UTC+02:00 (CEST)
- INSEE/Postal code: 38038 /38690
- ^{1} French Land Register data, which excludes lakes, ponds, glaciers > 1 km^{2} (0.386 sq mi or 247 acres) and river estuaries.

Belmont (French pronunciation: [bɛlmɔ̃]) is a commune in the Isère department in southeastern France.

== Population ==
Historical population
Year	Pop.	±% p.a.
1968	196	—
1975	172	−1.85%
1982	199	+2.10%
1990	214	+0.91%
1999	266	+2.45%
2007	416	+5.75%
2012	499	+3.71%
2017	598	+3.69%
2023	636	+1.03%
Source: INSEE

== See also ==
- Communes of the Isère department
