= Eydoche =

- Commune
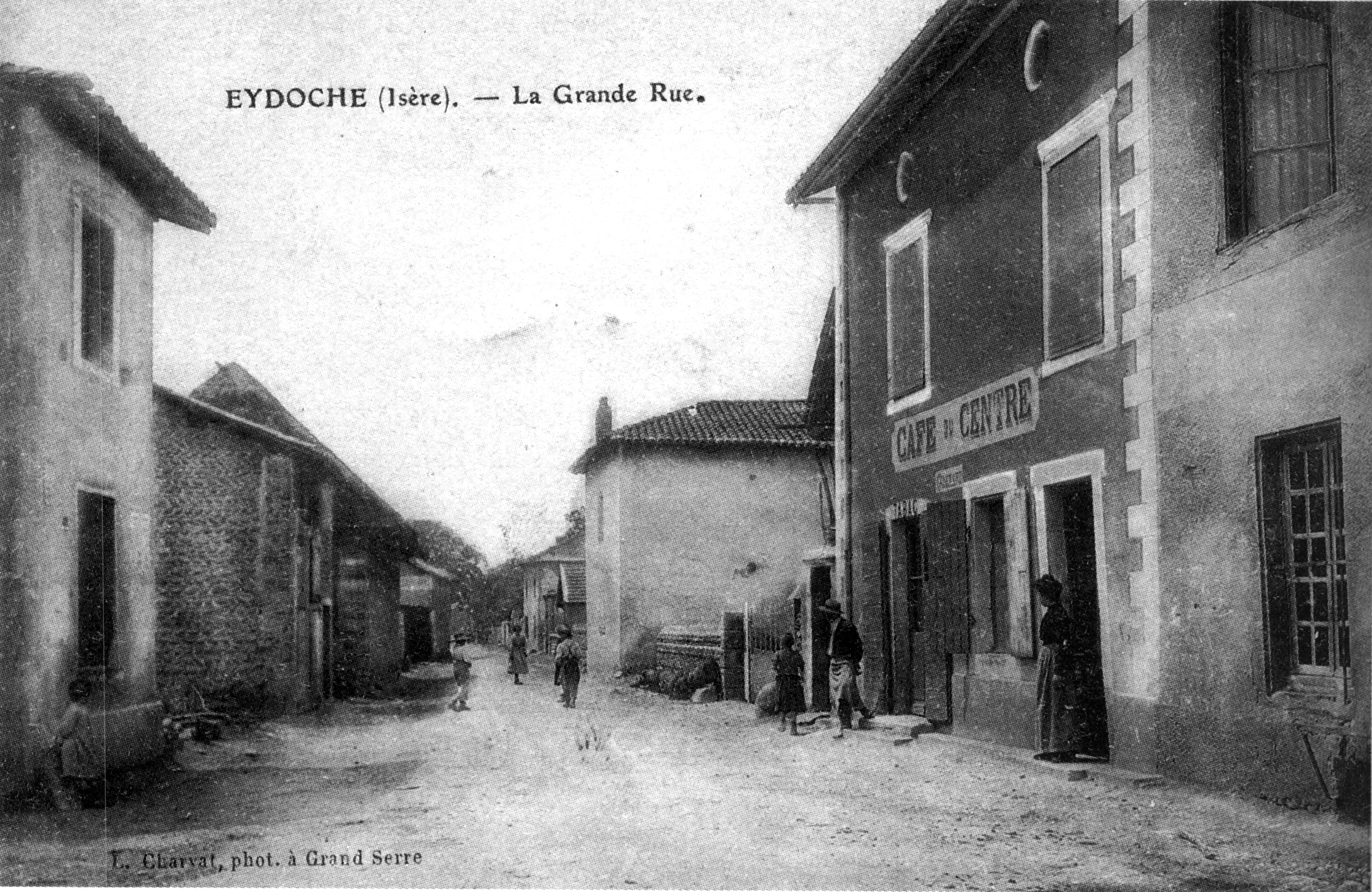
- The main road in 1920
- Location of Eydoche
- Location within France Location within Auvergne-Rhône-Alpes
- Coordinates: 45°26′32″N 5°19′54″E
- Country: France
- Region: Auvergne-Rhône-Alpes
- Department: Isère
- Arrondissement: La Tour-du-Pin
- Canton: Le Grand-Lemps
- Intercommunality: Bièvre Est

Government
  - Mayor (2020–2026): Catherine Ronco
- Area^{1}: 5.58 km^{2} (2.15 sq mi)
- Elevation: 510 m (1,670 ft)
- Highest elevation: 629 m (2,064 ft)
- Lowest elevation: 493 m (1,617 ft)
- Population (2023): 543
  - Density: 97.3/km^{2} (252/sq mi)
- Time zone: UTC+01:00 (CET)
  - Summer (DST): UTC+02:00 (CEST)
- INSEE/Postal code: 38159 /38690
- ^{1} French Land Register data, which excludes lakes, ponds, glaciers > 1 km^{2} (0.386 sq mi or 247 acres) and river estuaries.

Eydoche (French pronunciation: [edɔʃ]) is a commune in the Isère department in southeastern France. It lies about 45 minutes from Grenoble on the former Route de Lyon, between Champier and Longchenal.

== Population ==
Historical population
| Year | Pop. | ±% p.a. |
|---|---|---|
| 1968 | 312 | — |
| 1975 | 302 | −0.46% |
| 1982 | 267 | −1.74% |
| 1990 | 307 | +1.76% |
| 1999 | 331 | +0.84% |
| 2007 | 432 | +3.38% |
| 2012 | 501 | +3.01% |
| 2017 | 533 | +1.25% |
| 2023 | 543 | +0.31% |
Source: INSEE

== Economy ==
Eydoche is a farming community, mostly dairy cattle, wheat and corn, with pastoral views. There used to be a fabric mill where very intricate jacquard fabrics were made. Many of the factory's retirees still live in the village. There is a former stone grinding mill owned by the Jullien family, where members of the family still live. Both the fabric and grinding mills were originally powered by water wheels fed from a "ruisseau" or stream.

In recent years a woodworking factory has been established. There is also a trucking company.

== Sights ==
There is the village "place" with the ancient church facing the "Monument des Morts" - with the names of soldiers lost during World War I and World War II. Many of the residents of Eydoche were active in the Resistance during World War II.

The walled cemetery is a short walk from the church.

== See also ==
- Communes of the Isère department
