= Doissin =

- Commune
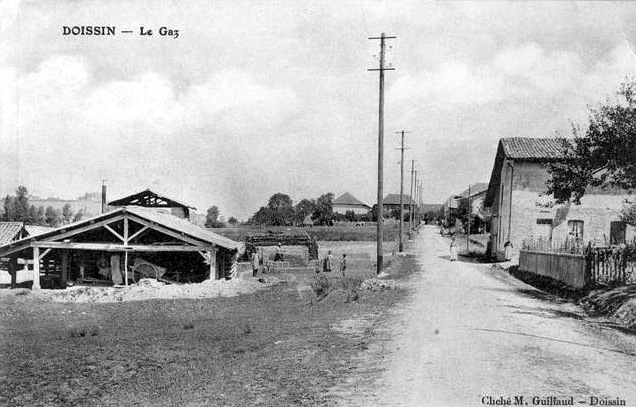
- Doissin in 1912

- Coat of arms
- Location of Doissin
- Location within France Location within Auvergne-Rhône-Alpes
- Coordinates: 45°30′01″N 5°25′28″E
- Country: France
- Region: Auvergne-Rhône-Alpes
- Department: Isère
- Arrondissement: La Tour-du-Pin
- Canton: Le Grand-Lemps

Government
  - Mayor (2020–2026): Véronique Seychelles
- Area^{1}: 8.45 km^{2} (3.26 sq mi)
- Highest elevation: 661 m (2,169 ft)
- Lowest elevation: 411 m (1,348 ft)
- Population (2023): 876
  - Density: 104/km^{2} (269/sq mi)
- Time zone: UTC+01:00 (CET)
  - Summer (DST): UTC+02:00 (CEST)
- INSEE/Postal code: 38147 /38730
- ^{1} French Land Register data, which excludes lakes, ponds, glaciers > 1 km^{2} (0.386 sq mi or 247 acres) and river estuaries.

Doissin (French pronunciation: [dwasɛ̃]) is a commune in the department of Isère in southeastern France.

== Geography ==
The main villages are: Bouis, Eynoud, Le Lutheau, Le Rousset, Trièves and Marquisière.

== Transportation ==
The nearest airport is GNB - Grenoble Saint Geoirs, located 16.7 km southwest of Doissin. The larger international airport LYS - Lyon Saint Exupery is 35.8 km northwest.

== Population ==
Historical population
Year	Pop.	±% p.a.
1968	406	—
1975	394	−0.43%
1982	461	+2.27%
1990	581	+2.93%
1999	616	+0.65%
2007	788	+3.13%
2012	858	+1.72%
2017	881	+0.53%
2023	876	−0.09%
Source: INSEE

== See also ==
- Communes of the Isère department
