= Oyeu =

- Commune
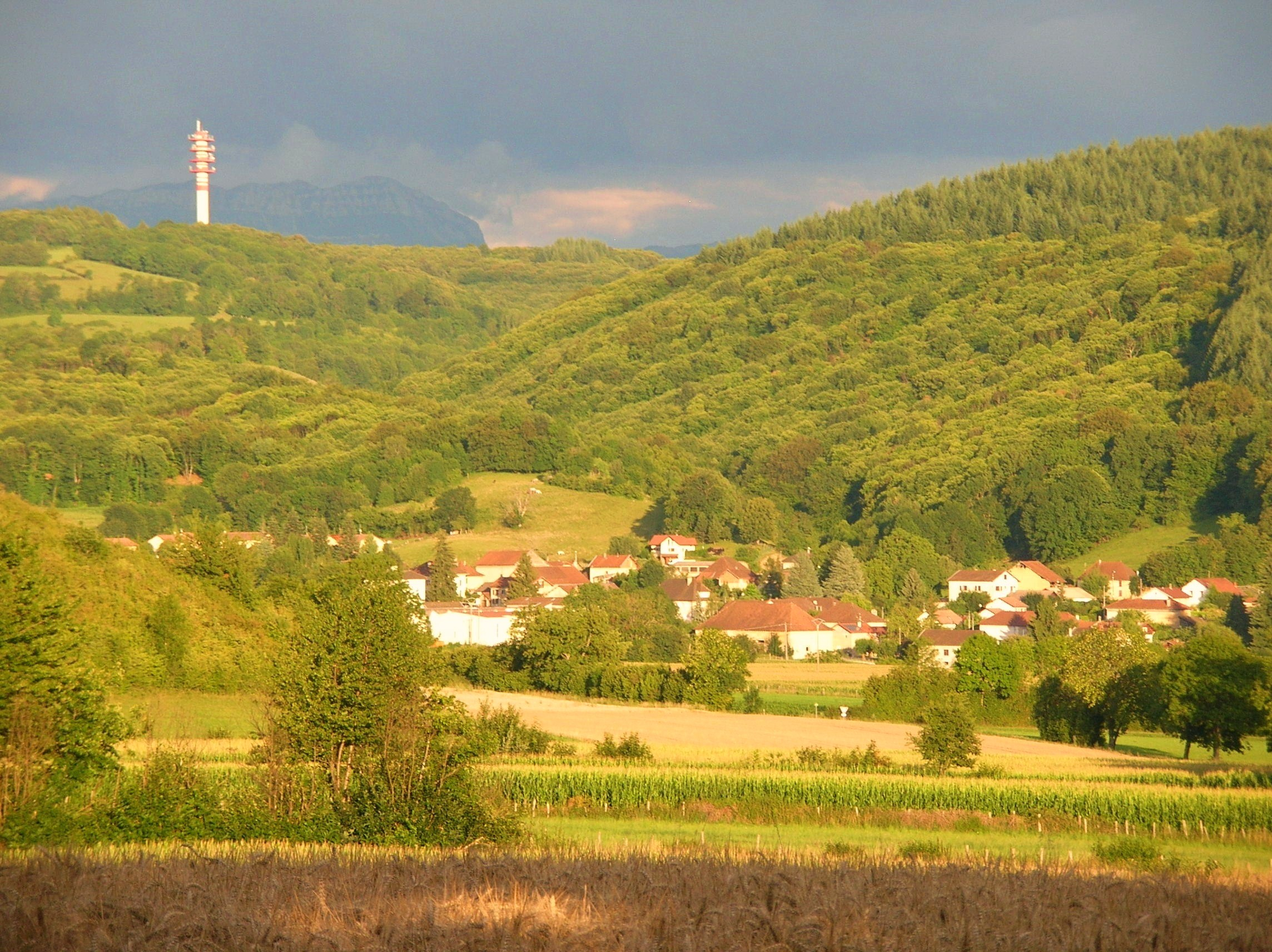
- The village of Oyeu

- Coat of arms
- Location of Oyeu
- Location within France Location within Auvergne-Rhône-Alpes
- Coordinates: 45°25′22″N 5°28′31″E
- Country: France
- Region: Auvergne-Rhône-Alpes
- Department: Isère
- Arrondissement: La Tour-du-Pin
- Canton: Le Grand-Lemps
- Intercommunality: Bièvre Est

Government
  - Mayor (2022–2026): Christophe Benoit
- Area^{1}: 13.69 km^{2} (5.29 sq mi)
- Highest elevation: 771 m (2,530 ft)
- Lowest elevation: 516 m (1,693 ft)
- Population (2023): 1,106
  - Density: 80.79/km^{2} (209.2/sq mi)
- Time zone: UTC+01:00 (CET)
  - Summer (DST): UTC+02:00 (CEST)
- INSEE/Postal code: 38287 /38690
- ^{1} French Land Register data, which excludes lakes, ponds, glaciers > 1 km^{2} (0.386 sq mi or 247 acres) and river estuaries.

Oyeu (French pronunciation: [ɔjø]) is a commune in the Isère department in southeastern France.

== Population ==
Historical population
Year	Pop.	±% p.a.
1968	532	—
1975	553	+0.55%
1982	556	+0.08%
1990	643	+1.83%
1999	754	+1.79%
2007	887	+2.05%
2012	915	+0.62%
2017	1,006	+1.91%
2023	1,106	+1.59%
Source: INSEE

== See also ==
- Communes of the Isère department
