= Valencogne =

- Commune
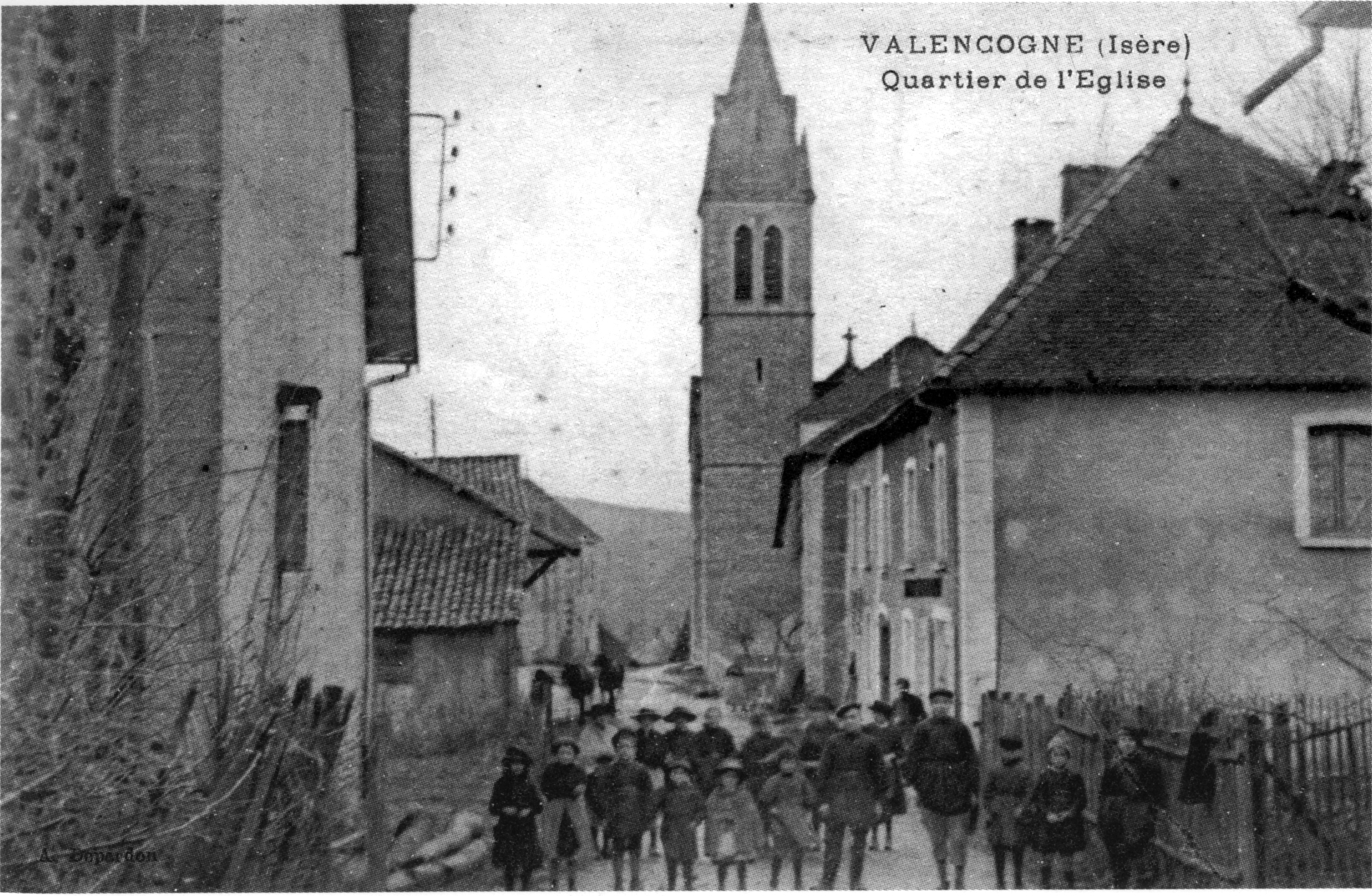
- Valencogne in 1910
- Location of Valencogne
- Location within France Location within Auvergne-Rhône-Alpes
- Coordinates: 45°30′00″N 5°32′27″E
- Country: France
- Region: Auvergne-Rhône-Alpes
- Department: Isère
- Arrondissement: La Tour-du-Pin
- Canton: Le Grand-Lemps

Government
  - Mayor (2020–2026): Julien Ventura
- Area^{1}: 7.55 km^{2} (2.92 sq mi)
- Elevation: 650 m (2,130 ft)
- Highest elevation: 680 m (2,230 ft)
- Lowest elevation: 516 m (1,693 ft)
- Population (2023): 666
  - Density: 88.2/km^{2} (228/sq mi)
- Time zone: UTC+01:00 (CET)
  - Summer (DST): UTC+02:00 (CEST)
- INSEE/Postal code: 38520 /38730
- ^{1} French Land Register data, which excludes lakes, ponds, glaciers > 1 km^{2} (0.386 sq mi or 247 acres) and river estuaries.

Valencogne (French pronunciation: [valɑ̃kɔɲ]) is a commune in the Isère department in southeastern France.

== Population ==
Historical population
Year	Pop.	±% p.a.
1968	328	—
1975	326	−0.09%
1982	317	−0.40%
1990	410	+3.27%
1999	458	+1.24%
2007	574	+2.86%
2012	622	+1.62%
2017	689	+2.07%
2023	666	−0.56%
Source: INSEE

== See also ==
- Communes of the Isère department
