= Colombe, Isère =

Colombe
- Commune
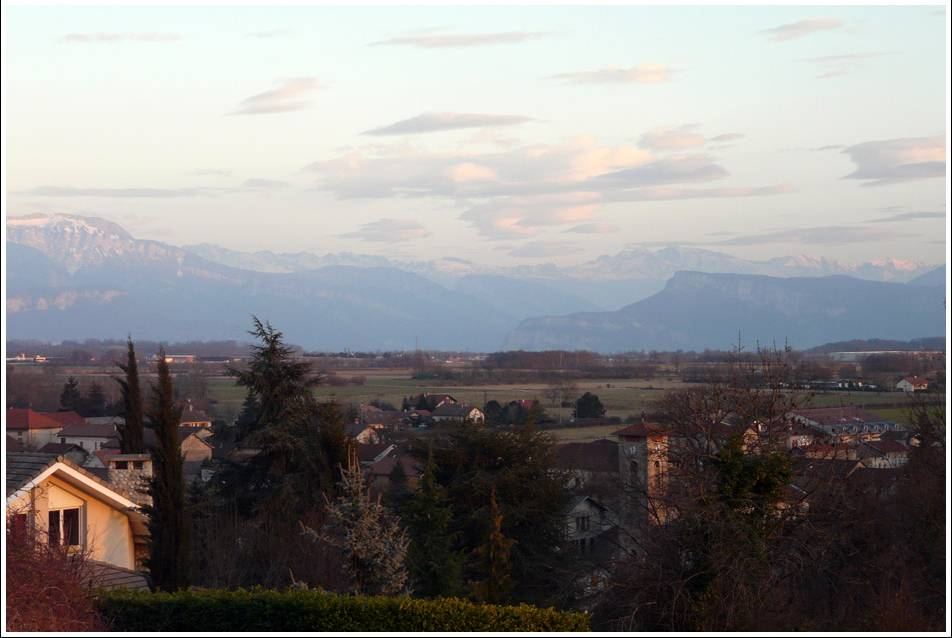
- A general view of Colombe

- Coat of arms
- Location of Colombe
- Location within France Location within Auvergne-Rhône-Alpes
- Coordinates: 45°23′59″N 5°27′01″E
- Country: France
- Region: Auvergne-Rhône-Alpes
- Department: Isère
- Arrondissement: La Tour-du-Pin
- Canton: Le Grand-Lemps
- Intercommunality: Bièvre Est

Government
  - Mayor (2020–2026): Martine Jacquin
- Area^{1}: 13.23 km^{2} (5.11 sq mi)
- Elevation: 480 m (1,570 ft)
- Highest elevation: 738 m (2,421 ft)
- Lowest elevation: 448 m (1,470 ft)
- Population (2023): 1,890
  - Density: 143/km^{2} (370/sq mi)
- Time zone: UTC+01:00 (CET)
  - Summer (DST): UTC+02:00 (CEST)
- INSEE/Postal code: 38118 /38690
- ^{1} French Land Register data, which excludes lakes, ponds, glaciers > 1 km^{2} (0.386 sq mi or 247 acres) and river estuaries.

Colombe (French pronunciation: [kɔlɔ̃b]) is a commune in the Isère department in southeastern France.

== Population ==
Historical population
Year	Pop.	±% p.a.
1968	644	—
1975	724	+1.69%
1982	857	+2.44%
1990	1,171	+3.98%
1999	1,434	+2.28%
2007	1,446	+0.10%
2012	1,470	+0.33%
2017	1,574	+1.38%
2023	1,890	+3.10%
Source: INSEE

== See also ==
- Communes of the Isère department
