= Bizonnes =

- Commune
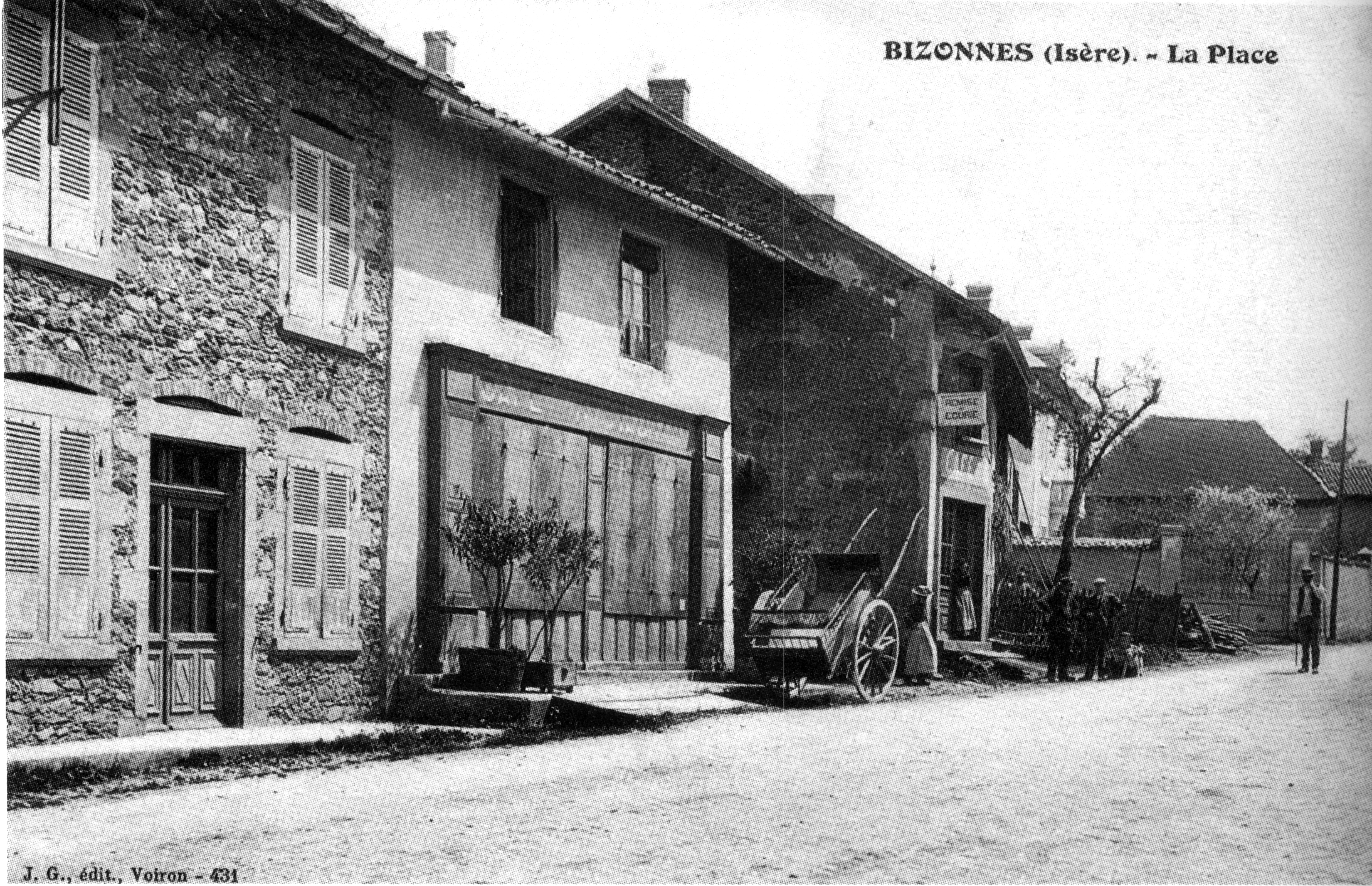
- The village square in 1910
- Location of Bizonnes
- Location within France Location within Auvergne-Rhône-Alpes
- Coordinates: 45°27′21″N 5°22′52″E
- Country: France
- Region: Auvergne-Rhône-Alpes
- Department: Isère
- Arrondissement: La Tour-du-Pin
- Canton: Le Grand-Lemps
- Intercommunality: Bièvre Est

Government
  - Mayor (2020–2026): René Gallifet
- Area^{1}: 11.04 km^{2} (4.26 sq mi)
- Elevation: 630 m (2,070 ft)
- Highest elevation: 642 m (2,106 ft)
- Lowest elevation: 529 m (1,736 ft)
- Population (2023): 1,028
  - Density: 93.12/km^{2} (241.2/sq mi)
- Time zone: UTC+01:00 (CET)
  - Summer (DST): UTC+02:00 (CEST)
- INSEE/Postal code: 38046 /38690
- ^{1} French Land Register data, which excludes lakes, ponds, glaciers > 1 km^{2} (0.386 sq mi or 247 acres) and river estuaries.

Bizonnes (French pronunciation: [bizɔn]) is a commune in the Isère department in southeastern France. The closest airport to Bizonnes is Grenoble Airport (10 km).

== Geography ==
Bizonnes is located 20 miles from Bourgoin-Jallieu and 18 km from Voiron.

== Population ==
Historical population
Year	Pop.	±% p.a.
1968	564	—
1975	584	+0.50%
1982	609	+0.60%
1990	623	+0.28%
1999	629	+0.11%
2007	702	+1.38%
2012	876	+4.53%
2017	963	+1.91%
2023	1,028	+1.09%
Source: INSEE

== See also ==
- Communes of the Isère department
