= Canton of Le Grand-Lemps =

Division of Eastern France

Coordinates: 45.40°N 5.42°E

The canton of Le Grand-Lemps is an administrative division of the Isère department, eastern France. Its borders were modified at the French canton reorganisation which came into effect in March 2015. Its seat is in Le Grand-Lemps.

It consists of the following communes:

1. Apprieu
2. Belmont
3. Bévenais
4. Bilieu
5. Biol
6. Bizonnes
7. Blandin
8. Burcin
9. Châbons
10. Charavines
11. Chassignieu
12. Chélieu
13. Chirens
14. Colombe
15. Doissin
16. Eydoche
17. Flachères
18. Le Grand-Lemps
19. Izeaux
20. Longechenal
21. Massieu
22. Montferrat
23. Montrevel
24. Oyeu
25. Saint-Didier-de-Bizonnes
26. Saint-Ondras
27. Saint-Sulpice-des-Rivoires
28. Val-de-Virieu
29. Valencogne
30. Villages du Lac de Paladru
