= Biol, Isère =

Biol
- Commune
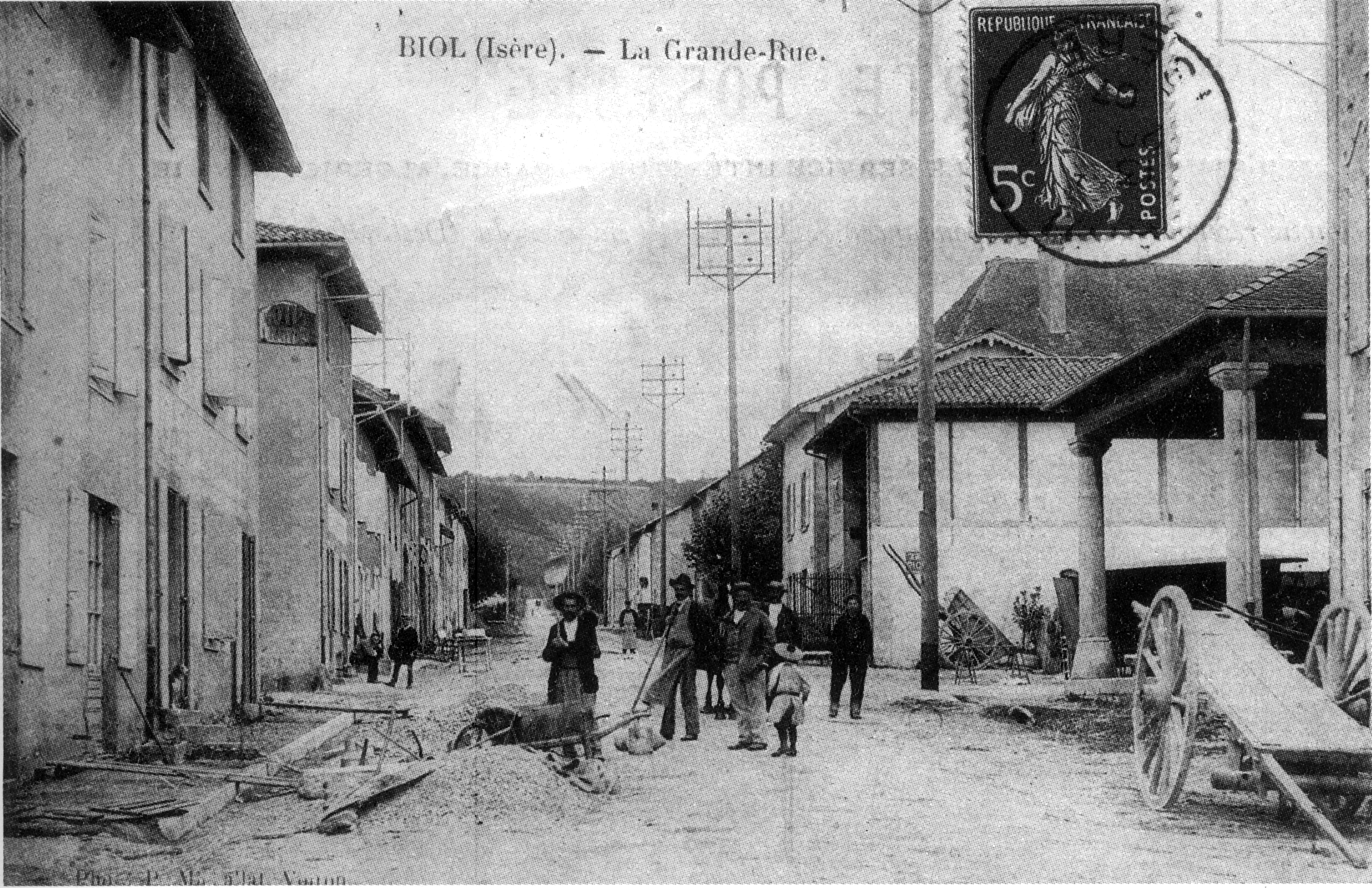
- The main road in 1908
- Location of Biol
- Location within France Location within Auvergne-Rhône-Alpes
- Coordinates: 45°29′33″N 5°23′10″E
- Country: France
- Region: Auvergne-Rhône-Alpes
- Department: Isère
- Arrondissement: La Tour-du-Pin
- Canton: Le Grand-Lemps

Government
  - Mayor (2020–2026): Patrick Belmont
- Area^{1}: 15.51 km^{2} (5.99 sq mi)
- Highest elevation: 691 m (2,267 ft)
- Lowest elevation: 438 m (1,437 ft)
- Population (2023): 1,594
  - Density: 102.8/km^{2} (266.2/sq mi)
- Time zone: UTC+01:00 (CET)
  - Summer (DST): UTC+02:00 (CEST)
- INSEE/Postal code: 38044 /38690
- ^{1} French Land Register data, which excludes lakes, ponds, glaciers > 1 km^{2} (0.386 sq mi or 247 acres) and river estuaries.

Biol (French pronunciation: [bjɔl]) is a commune in the Isère department in southeastern France.

== Population ==
Historical population
Year	Pop.	±% p.a.
1968	810	—
1975	774	−0.65%
1982	972	+3.31%
1990	1,025	+0.67%
1999	1,203	+1.80%
2007	1,311	+1.08%
2012	1,410	+1.47%
2017	1,419	+0.13%
2023	1,594	+1.96%
Source: INSEE

== See also ==
- Communes of the Isère department
