= Bouvesse-Quirieu =

- Commune
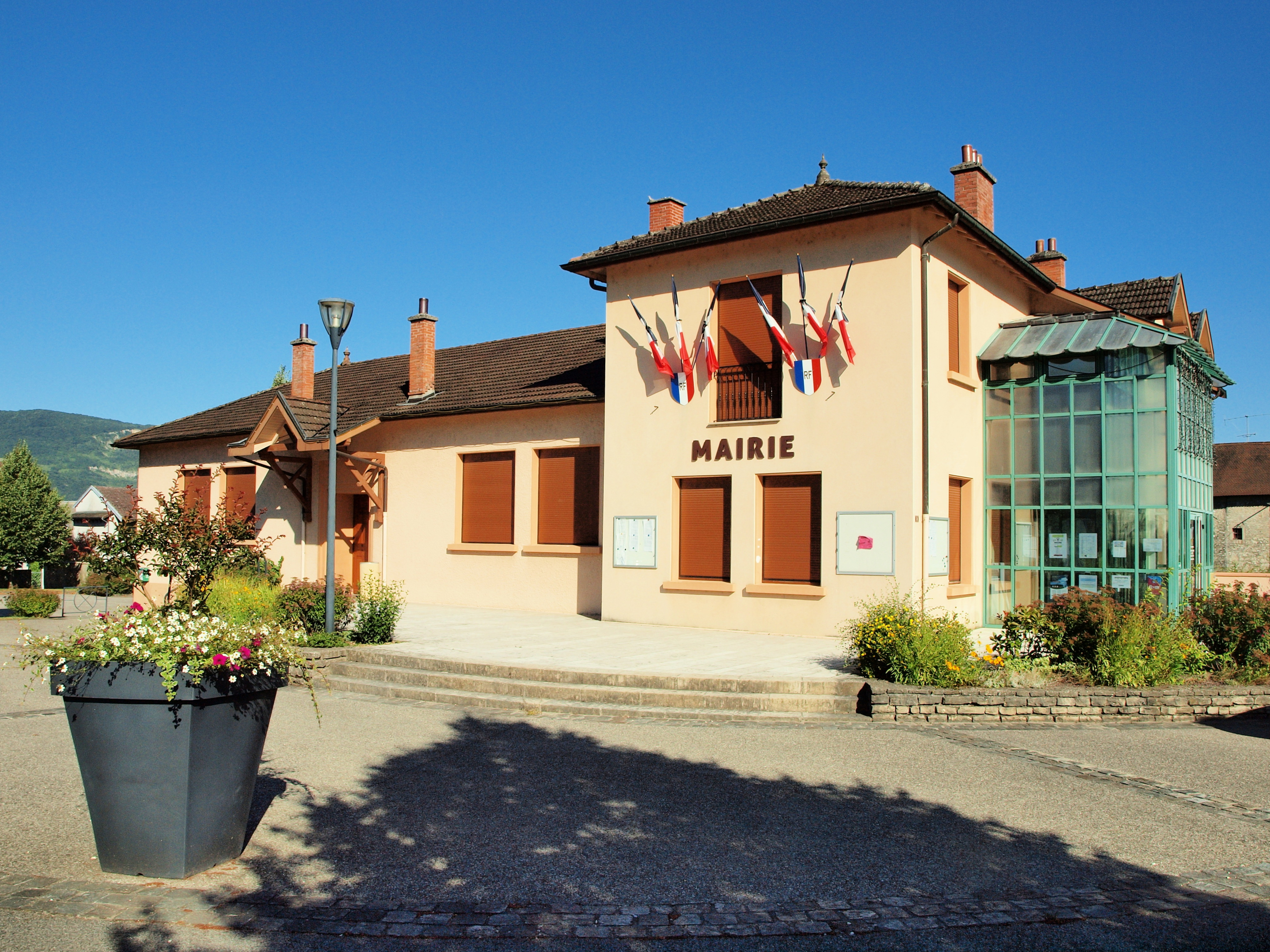
- The town hall in Bouvesse-Quirieu
- Location of Bouvesse-Quirieu
- Location within France Location within Auvergne-Rhône-Alpes
- Coordinates: 45°47′46″N 5°24′55″E
- Country: France
- Region: Auvergne-Rhône-Alpes
- Department: Isère
- Arrondissement: La Tour-du-Pin
- Canton: Morestel

Government
  - Mayor (2020–2026): Frédéric Gonzalez
- Area^{1}: 17.51 km^{2} (6.76 sq mi)
- Highest elevation: 338 m (1,109 ft)
- Lowest elevation: 200 m (660 ft)
- Population (2023): 1,524
  - Density: 87.04/km^{2} (225.4/sq mi)
- Time zone: UTC+01:00 (CET)
  - Summer (DST): UTC+02:00 (CEST)
- INSEE/Postal code: 38054 /38390
- ^{1} French Land Register data, which excludes lakes, ponds, glaciers > 1 km^{2} (0.386 sq mi or 247 acres) and river estuaries.

Bouvesse-Quirieu (French pronunciation: [buvɛs kiʁjø]) is a commune in the Isère department in southeastern France.

== Population ==
The inhabitants of Bouvesse-Quirieu are called Bouvessards in French.

Historical population

Year	Pop.	±% p.a.
1793	585	—
1800	546	−0.98%
1821	649	+0.83%
1831	723	+1.09%
1846	1,059	+2.58%
1851	1,076	+0.32%
1861	1,117	+0.37%
1872	1,017	−0.85%
1881	1,044	+0.29%
1891	1,176	+1.20%
1901	1,062	−1.01%
1911	1,002	−0.58%
1921	924	−0.81%

Year	Pop.	±% p.a.
1931	1,180	+2.48%
1946	912	−1.70%
1954	866	−0.64%
1962	926	+0.84%
1968	1,039	+1.94%
1975	1,038	−0.01%
1982	1,067	+0.39%
1990	998	−0.83%
1999	970	−0.32%
2007	1,306	+3.79%
2012	1,458	+2.23%
2017	1,512	+0.73%
2023	1,524	+0.13%

Source: EHESS and INSEE

=== Historical population movements ===
Since the first known census in 1793, the population has slowly increased until it passed the threshold of 1000 inhabitants around the 1840s. From 1840 until the beginning of the First World War, the population remained stable at around 1000. Then, between the census of 1911 and 1921, the number of inhabitants fell from 1002 to 924. It increased again until it reached its highest level in 1931, with 1180 inhabitants. The next census, carried out in 1946, one year after the end of the Second World War, again recorded a significant drop in population, to 912. It was not until the 1968 census that the number of inhabitants passed the 1000 mark again. It was not until 2007 that a real demographic growth could be recorded, with the population rising from 998 inhabitants in 1999 to 1306 in 2007 and 1512 in 2017.

We can clearly see how the Two World Wars took their death tool on Bouvesse Quirieu with the decrease of 1921 and 1946 censuses. However, it is interesting to note that the Napoleonic Wars, which happened between 1803 and 1805 apparently didn't impacted number of inhabitants of Bouvesse-Quirieu; quite the opposite in fact, population increased by +0.83% between 1800 and 1821.

== Geography ==
=== Situation and description ===
Bouvesse-Quirieu is a modest rural commune situated in a hilly region. The village stands at an altitude of 220 m and is located about 30 km north-east of Bourgoin-Jallieu, in the northern part of the Isère department.

=== Geology ===
The "Oxfordian siliceous sponges of the Bouvesse quarry" are a remarkable geological site of 55.12 hectares located in the communes of Bouvesse-Quirieu and Montalieu-Vercieu. In 2014, this formation of bedded limestone of palaeontological interest was classified as "two stars" in the "Inventory of Geological Heritage".

=== Neighbouring municipalities ===
Bouvesse-Quirieu is bordered by Montalieu-Vercieu, Charette, Courtenay and Creys-Mépieu, in Isère, and by Briord, Montagnieu and Serrières-de-Briord on the other side of the Rhône, in the Ain department.

=== Climate ===
The northern part of the department of Isère is made up of plains with a temperate climate and low plateaus and hills with a slightly harsher climate. Due to the low relief, air masses from the north and south circulate easily.

The territory also experiences a lot of persistent fog in the most rural areas in the Rhone valley, as well as in the water areas surrounding the towns and various hamlets.

== Urbanism ==
=== Typology ===
Bouvesse-Quirieu is a rural commune, as it is one of the communes with low or very low density, according to the Insee communal density grid. The commune is also out of the attraction of the cities.

=== Land use ===
The land use of the municipality, as shown by the European biophysical land use database Corine Land Cover (CLC), is marked by the importance of agricultural land (56.9% in 2018), which is nevertheless decreasing compared to 1990 (58.6%). The detailed breakdown in 2018 is as follows: forests (23.6%), arable land (21.6%), heterogeneous agricultural areas (19%), grasslands (16.3%), urbanised areas (6.3%), mines, landfill sites and building sites (5.9%), industrial or commercial areas and communication networks (3.3%), continental waters (2.3%), shrubby and/or herbaceous vegetation (1.5%)7.

The IGN also provides an online tool that allows the comparison of the evolution over time of the land use of the municipality (or of territories at different scales). Several periods are accessible in the form of maps or aerial photos: the Cassini map (18th century), the staff map (1820-1866) and the current period (1950 to the present).

=== Villages - Hamlets ===
The commune has many hamlets: Enieu, Marlieu, Quirieu, Le Bayard, Le Port-de-Quirieu, Chavannes, Chogne, Annolieu and Cruvières. It also has a few places such as La Rivoire, Clos Gilet, Les Usines, Le Boissonnet, Grange-Neuve.

== Natural hazards and risks ==
The entire territory of the commune of Bouvesse-Quirieu is located in seismicity zone n°3 (on a scale of 1 to 5), like most of the communes in its geographical sector.

== See also ==
- Communes of the Isère department
