= La Balme-les-Grottes =

- Commune
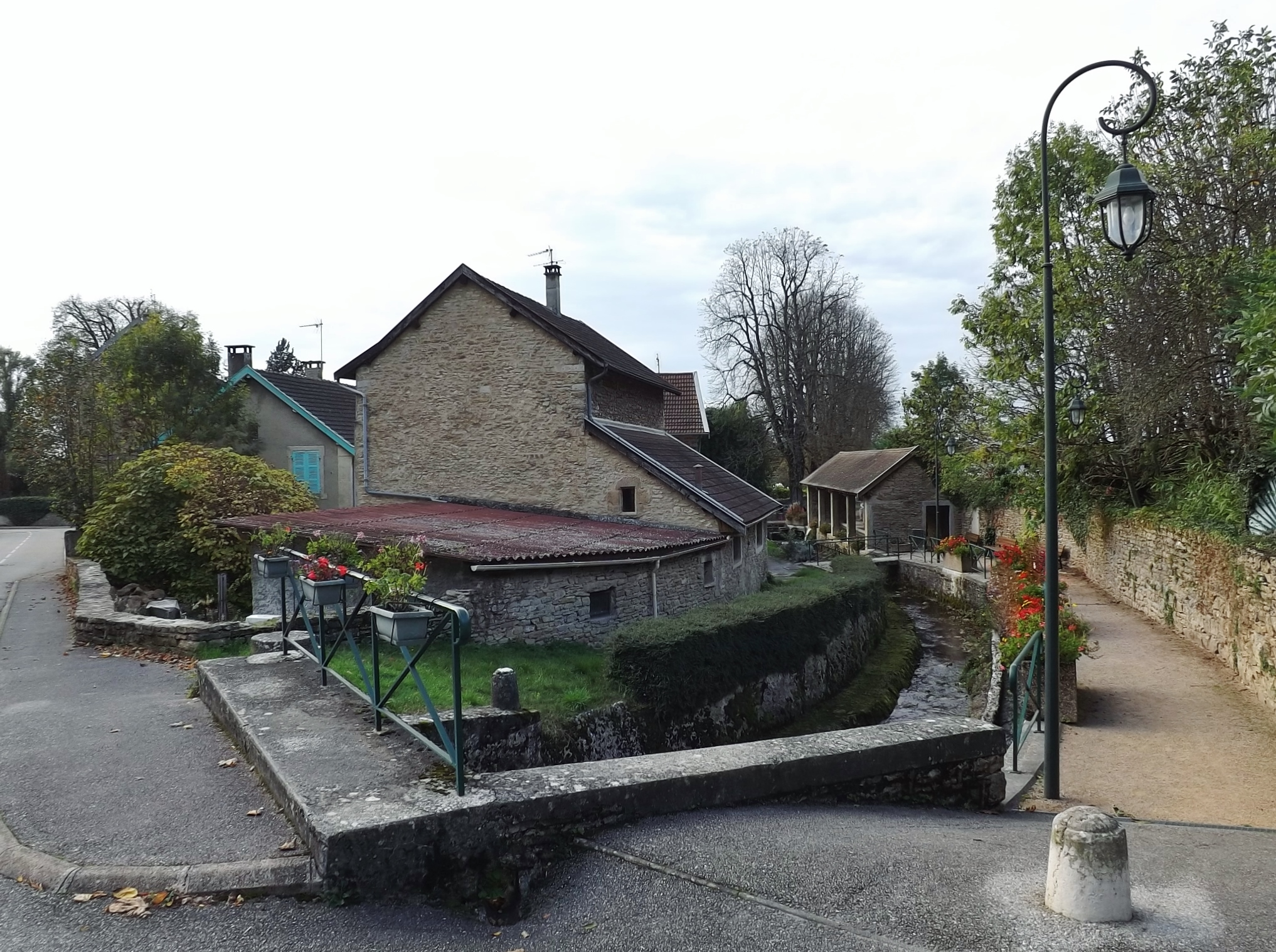
- The Lavoir (Public laundry)

- Coat of arms
- Location of La Balme-les-Grottes
- Location within France Location within Auvergne-Rhône-Alpes
- Coordinates: 45°51′12″N 5°20′13″E
- Country: France
- Region: Auvergne-Rhône-Alpes
- Department: Isère
- Arrondissement: La Tour-du-Pin
- Canton: Morestel
- Intercommunality: Les Balcons du Dauphiné

Government
  - Mayor (2020–2026): Jean-Pierre Berthelot
- Area^{1}: 14.61 km^{2} (5.64 sq mi)
- Elevation: 210 m (690 ft)
- Highest elevation: 383 m (1,257 ft)
- Lowest elevation: 192 m (630 ft)
- Population (2023): 1,146
  - Density: 78.44/km^{2} (203.2/sq mi)
- Time zone: UTC+01:00 (CET)
  - Summer (DST): UTC+02:00 (CEST)
- INSEE/Postal code: 38026 /38390
- ^{1} French Land Register data, which excludes lakes, ponds, glaciers > 1 km^{2} (0.386 sq mi or 247 acres) and river estuaries.

La Balme-les-Grottes (French pronunciation: [la balm le ɡʁɔt]) is a commune in the Isère department in the Auvergne-Rhône-Alpes region of south-eastern France.

== Geography ==
La Balme-des-Grottes is located some 32 km east by north-east of Lyon and 11 km south of Ambérieu-en-Bugey on the right bank of the Rhône. The Rhône also forms the departmental border between Isère and Ain. Access to the commune is by the D65 road from Leyrieu in the south which passes through the length of the commune and the village and continues north to join the D1075 west of Vertrieu. The D52B branches from the D65 in the commune and goes south to Saint-Baudille-de-la-Tour. The D52C also branches from the D65 at the same intersection and goes south-east to Charette. The commune is mixed forest and farmland with dense forests in the north-east.

The Rhône river forms the entire western border of the commune with no crossing points anywhere in the commune. The commune is covered by a network of canals linked to the Rhône and the Ruisseau de Laye which is a minor loop of the Rhône.

=== Neighbouring communes and villages ===
Source:

== History ==
Neanderthal men from the Middle Paleolithic period left flint tools and food scraps in the La Balme caves. Around 15000/13000 BC, in the late Upper Paleolithic, Cro-Magnon hunters did the same in the shelter of the cave: flints and bones of reindeer, ibex, aurochs, and horses have been found.

From about 4000 BC, Neolithic farmers colonised the region leaving their polished axes, flints, and pots in Louvaresse and Travers. Collective graves and vases have also been found in the cave from that time. It was especially at the end of the Bronze Age that they left very important remains (1250-950 BC): numerous tombs with cremation urns and animal offerings have been found in crevices and under boulders in a large part of the cave. It is an underground necropolis of the Urnfield culture notable for its wealth of ceramic vases.

Part of the archaeological material from all eras is displayed in the Heritage House at Hières-sur-Amby where it was sent in 1985 by the excavators.

=== Heraldry ===
Arms of La Balme-les-Grottes	The official status of the blazon remains to be determined. Blazon: Party per bend sinister wavy, at first Argent a dolphin Azure; at second Vert, an entry to a cave Argent charged with a church proper of 3 levels with the sinister wall mouvant windows open and a slope proper mouvant to dexter, over a path in bend sinister of Azure mouvant to base, with another path in bend sinister proper to dexter mouvant to base, in chief wavy of Azure; at the bend sinister wavy debruised by a bend sinister wavy of Azure charged with 6 ribbands wavy of Argent.

== Administration ==
List of Successive Mayors

From	To	Name
2001	2014	Didier Chapit
2014	2020	Martine Gabeure
2020	2026	Jean-Pierre Berthelot

== Demography ==
The inhabitants of the commune are known as Balmolans or Balmolanes in French.

Historical population

Year	Pop.	±% p.a.
1793	514	—
1821	654	+0.86%
1846	892	+1.25%
1872	759	−0.62%
1901	461	−1.70%
1926	384	−0.73%
1946	330	−0.75%
1962	426	+1.61%
1968	393	−1.33%

Year	Pop.	±% p.a.
1975	438	+1.56%
1982	531	+2.79%
1990	588	+1.28%
1999	675	+1.54%
2007	887	+3.47%
2012	936	+1.08%
2017	1,060	+2.52%
2023	1,146	+1.31%

Source: EHESS and INSEE

== Economy ==
- BioMérieux

== Culture and heritage ==
=== Civil heritage ===
The commune has many buildings and sites that are registered as historical monuments:

- Houses (16th-20th century)
- The Town Hall / School at Route de Lagneu (1882)
- The Chateau de Salette (13th century). The remaining buildings of the former Carthusian monastery of Salette. The facades and roofs of the chateau are from the 19th century. In October 1299 Dauphin Humbert I of Viennois founded a monastery for women of which three buildings remain. During the French Revolution the monastery was sold and is home for some time to an earthenware factory. The chateau was built around 1870-1880 and preserves some decorations from that time.
- The Chateau d'Amblérieu (ruins) (14th century)
- The War Memorial (20th century)
- Mills (17th-20th century)
- A Lavoir (Public laundry) (1879)
- The Chateau de La Serve (1818)
- The Chateau Delphinal (13th century)

=== Religious heritage ===
The commune has several religious buildings and structures that are registered as historical monuments:

- A Wayside Cross at Rue des Grottes (17th century)
- The Favre family Tomb (20th century)
- The Tomb of Eudoxie Gigard (19th century)
- The Péricaud family Tomb (19th century)
- The Cemetery (1865)
- The Priory of Notre-Dame (1660)
- The Chapel of Notre-Dame of the Grotto (12th century) The Chapel contains a large number of items that are registered as historical objects.
- The Parish Church of Saint Peter (12th century) The Church contains a large number of items that are registered as historical objects.

=== Environmental heritage ===
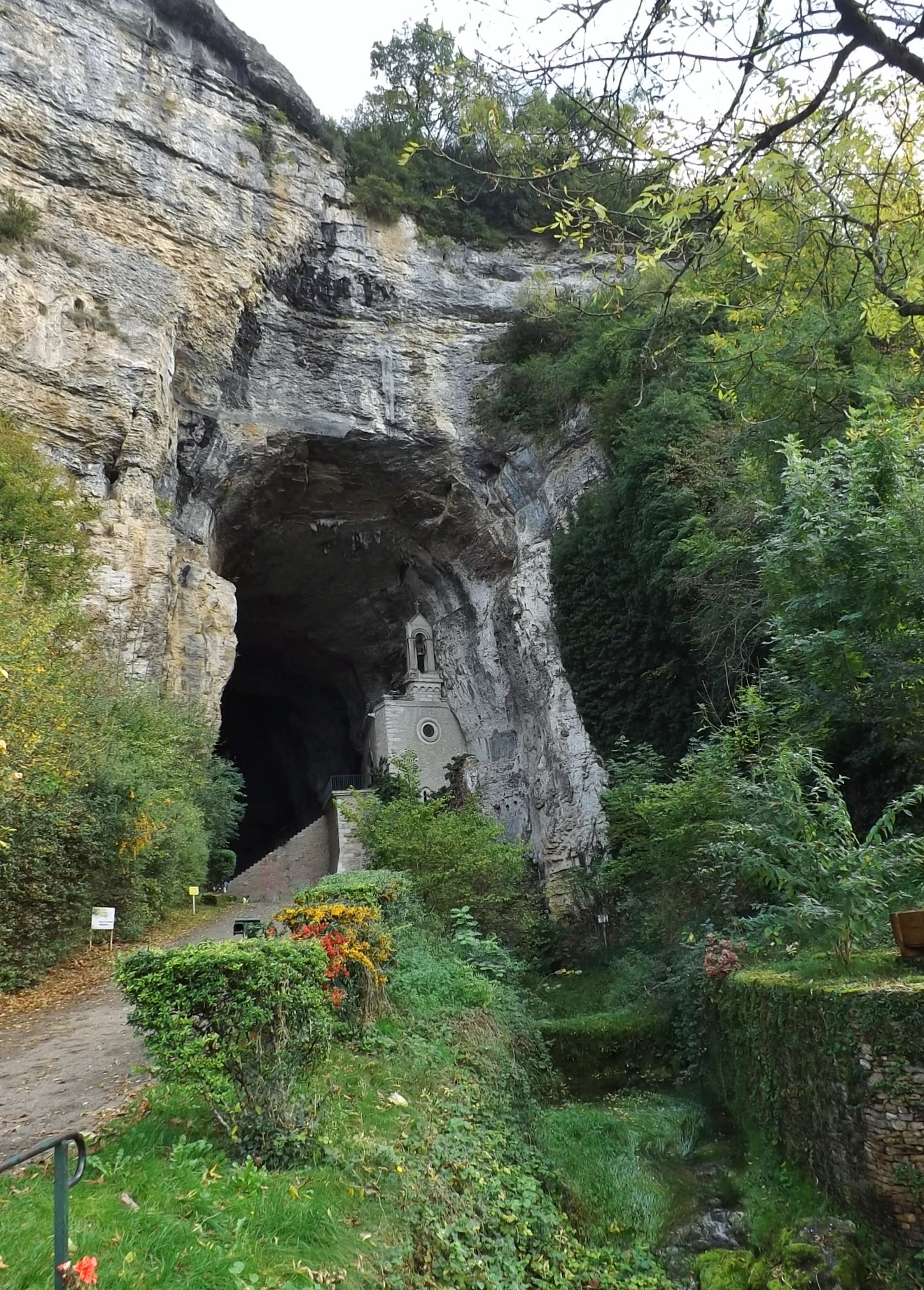
The entrance to the Cave

- The Grotte de La Balme (La Balme Cave) is one of the Seven Wonders of Dauphiné. It is a formation of an "amphitheatre of small basins". The caves were a hideout for Louis Mandrin. They were visited by François I and contain an apocryphal portrait of him. The caves contain several items that are registered as historical objects:
  - A Sarcophagus (Gallo-Roman)
  - A Funeral Stele (Gallo-Roman)
  - A Commemorative Plaque (Gallo-Roman)

== Notable people linked to the commune ==
- Laurent Clerc, founder of the first school for the Deaf in North America, born on 26 December 1785 in La Balme-les-Grottes.
- Jean Roux, priest of La Balme, left a pre-Revolutionary "Journal" of great interest.

== See also ==
- Communes of the Isère department
