= Passins =

Commune in Isère, France

- Part of Arandon-Passins
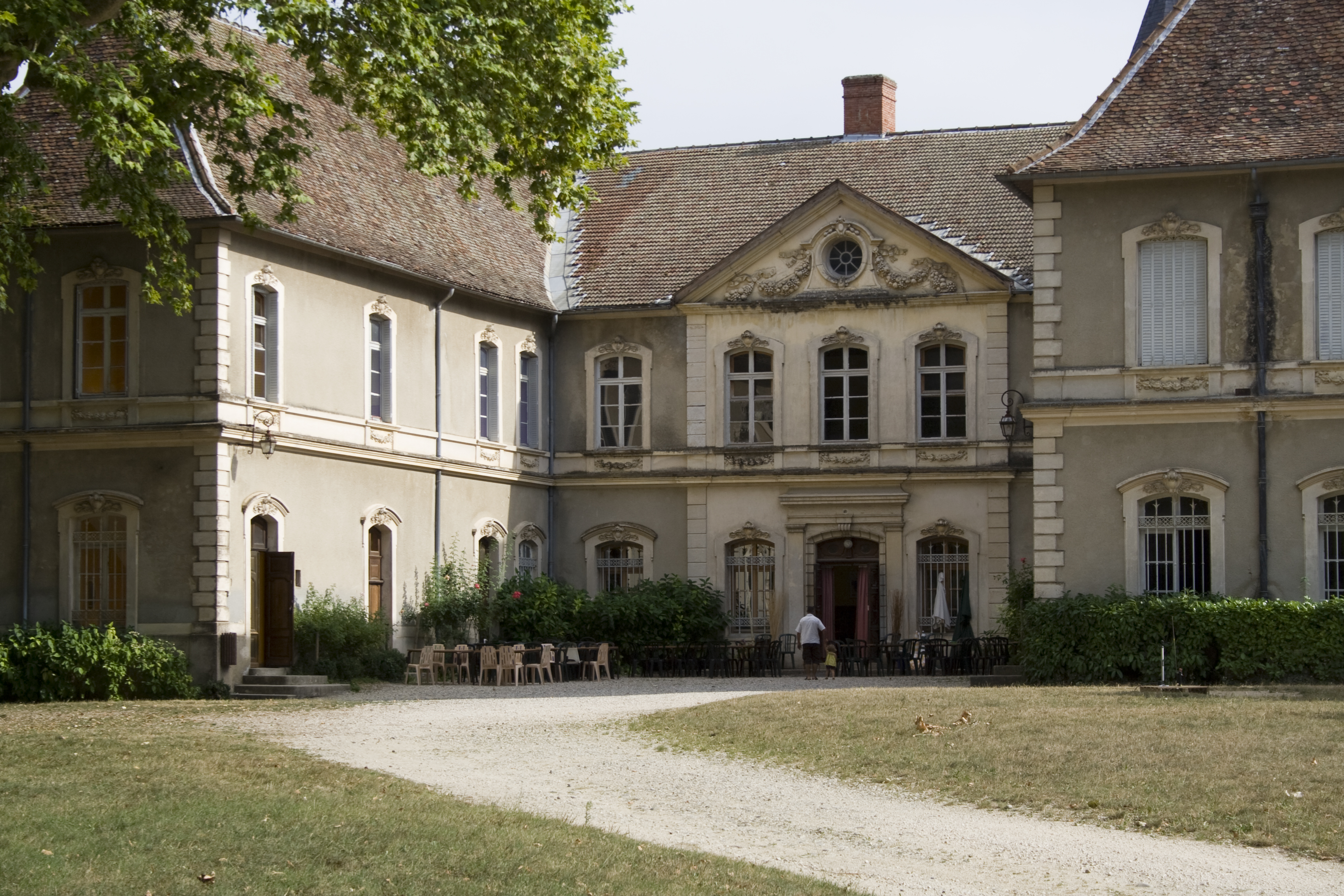
- Montolivet chateau
- Location of Passins
- Location within France Location within Auvergne-Rhône-Alpes
- Coordinates: 45°41′19″N 5°25′49″E
- Country: France
- Region: Auvergne-Rhône-Alpes
- Department: Isère
- Arrondissement: La Tour-du-Pin
- Canton: Morestel
- Commune: Arandon-Passins
- Area^{1}: 13.92 km^{2} (5.37 sq mi)
- Elevation: 270 m (890 ft)
- Highest elevation: 377 m (1,237 ft)
- Lowest elevation: 210 m (690 ft)
- Population (2022): 1,171
  - Density: 84.12/km^{2} (217.9/sq mi)
- Time zone: UTC+01:00 (CET)
  - Summer (DST): UTC+02:00 (CEST)
- Postal code: 38510
- ^{1} French Land Register data, which excludes lakes, ponds, glaciers > 1 km^{2} (0.386 sq mi or 247 acres) and river estuaries.

Passins (French pronunciation: [pasɛ̃]) is a former commune in the Isère department in southeastern France. On 1 January 2017, it was merged into the new commune Arandon-Passins.

== Population ==
Historical population

Year	Pop.	±% p.a.
1793	839	—
1821	850	+0.05%
1846	1,153	+1.23%
1872	1,083	−0.24%
1901	862	−0.78%
1926	665	−1.03%
1946	532	−1.11%
1962	478	−0.67%

Year	Pop.	±% p.a.
1968	443	−1.26%
1975	437	−0.19%
1982	569	+3.84%
1990	608	+0.83%
1999	696	+1.51%
2006	882	+3.44%
2022	1,171	+1.79%

Source: EHESS and INSEE

== See also ==
- Communes of the Isère department
