= Arandon =

Commune in Isère, France

- Part of Arandon-Passins
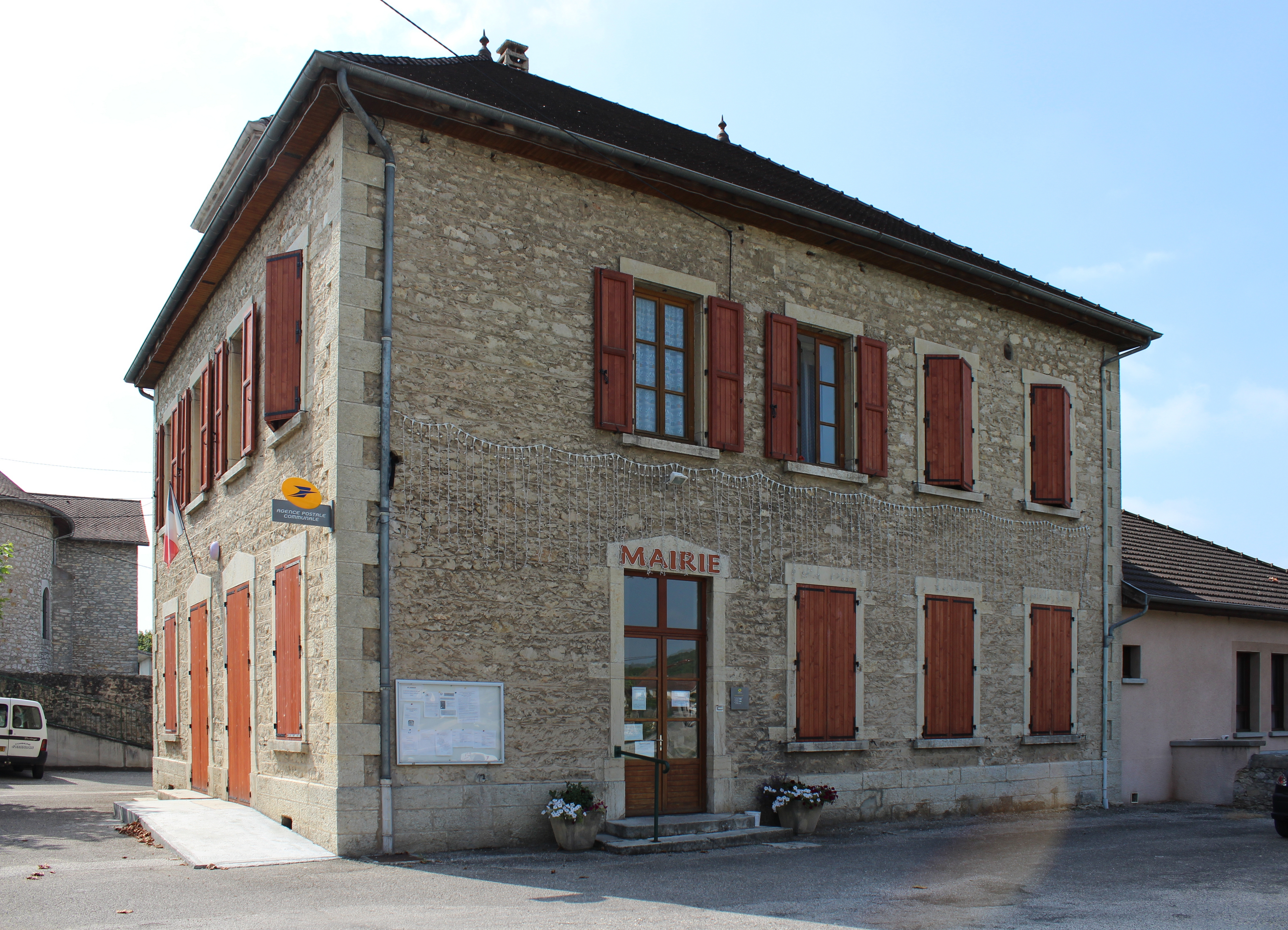
- Arandon - Mairie
- Location of Arandon
- Location within France Location within Auvergne-Rhône-Alpes
- Coordinates: 45°42′42″N 5°25′48″E
- Country: France
- Region: Auvergne-Rhône-Alpes
- Department: Isère
- Arrondissement: La Tour-du-Pin
- Canton: Morestel
- Commune: Arandon-Passins
- Area^{1}: 12.22 km^{2} (4.72 sq mi)
- Highest elevation: 292 m (958 ft)
- Lowest elevation: 212 m (696 ft)
- Population (2022): 687
  - Density: 56.2/km^{2} (146/sq mi)
- Time zone: UTC+01:00 (CET)
  - Summer (DST): UTC+02:00 (CEST)
- Postal code: 38510
- ^{1} French Land Register data, which excludes lakes, ponds, glaciers > 1 km^{2} (0.386 sq mi or 247 acres) and river estuaries.

Arandon (French pronunciation: [aʁɑ̃dɔ̃]) is a former commune in the Isère department in the Auvergne-Rhône-Alpes region of southeastern France. On 1 January 2017, it was merged into the new commune Arandon-Passins.

== History ==
During World War II, the town was the site of a French internment camp holding both French and foreign Jews as well as non-French internees.

== Population ==
Historical population
Year	Pop.	±% p.a.
1962	422	—
1968	388	−1.39%
1975	426	+1.34%
1982	391	−1.22%
1990	398	+0.22%
1999	405	+0.19%
2006	523	+3.72%
2022	687	+1.72%
Source: EHESS and INSEE

== See also ==
- Communes of the Isère department
