= Sorlin =

Sorlin may refer to:

People:

- Olivier Sorlin (born 1979), French football midfielder, currently playing for PAOK F.C. of Thessaloniki

Places:

- Montmelas-Saint-Sorlin
- Saint-Sorlin, Rhône
- Saint-Sorlin-d'Arves
- Saint-Sorlin-de-Conac
- Saint-Sorlin-de-Morestel
- Saint-Sorlin-de-Vienne
- Saint-Sorlin-en-Bugey
- Saint-Sorlin-en-Valloire
