= Saint-Victor-de-Morestel =

- Commune
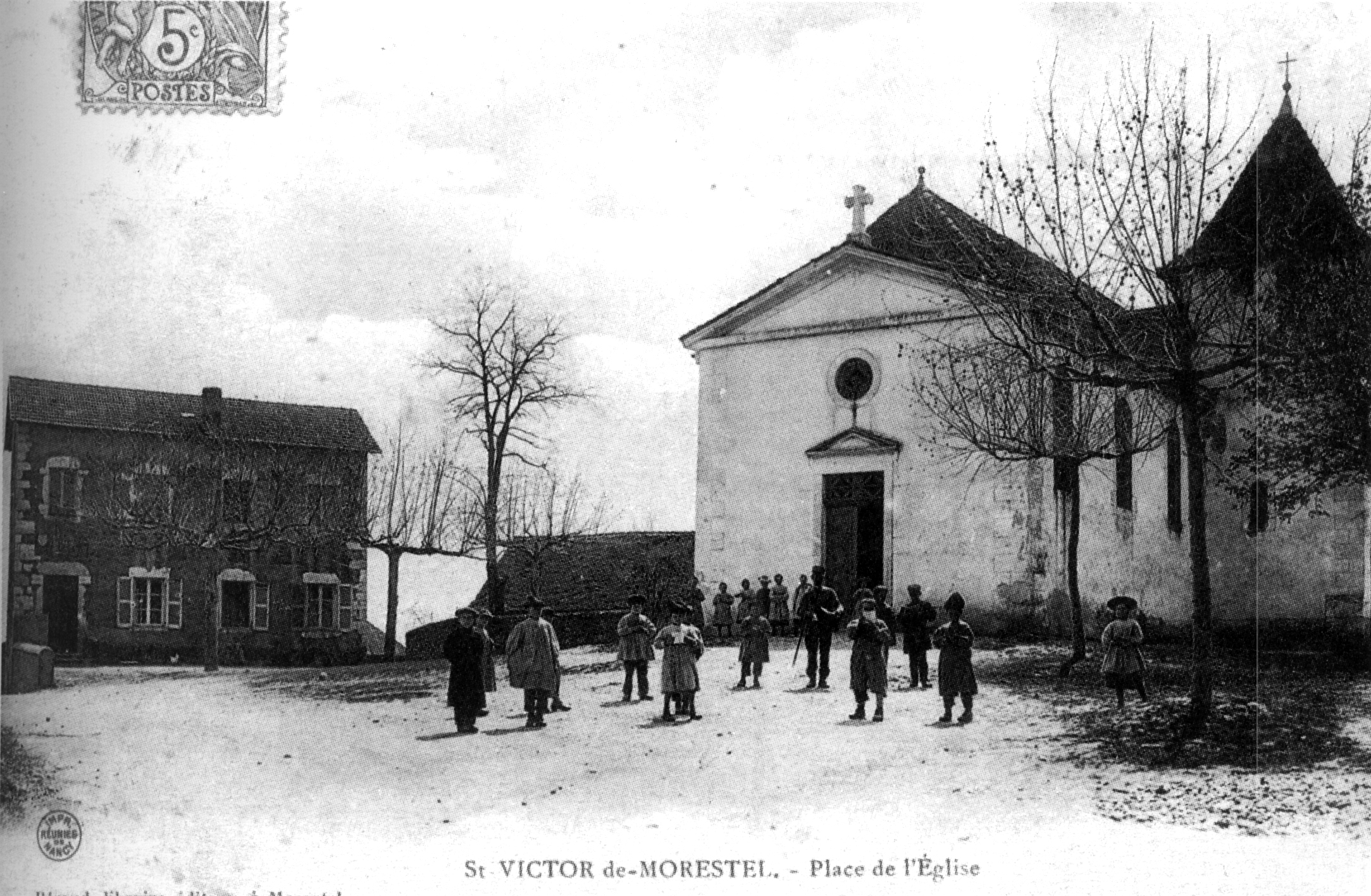
- Saint-Victor-de-Morestel in 1905
- Location of Saint-Victor-de-Morestel
- Location within France Location within Auvergne-Rhône-Alpes
- Coordinates: 45°41′50″N 5°30′14″E
- Country: France
- Region: Auvergne-Rhône-Alpes
- Department: Isère
- Arrondissement: La Tour-du-Pin
- Canton: Morestel

Government
  - Mayor (2020–2026): Frédérique Luzet
- Area^{1}: 13.13 km^{2} (5.07 sq mi)
- Elevation: 230 m (750 ft)
- Highest elevation: 272 m (892 ft)
- Lowest elevation: 205 m (673 ft)
- Population (2023): 1,168
  - Density: 88.96/km^{2} (230.4/sq mi)
- Time zone: UTC+01:00 (CET)
  - Summer (DST): UTC+02:00 (CEST)
- INSEE/Postal code: 38465 /38510
- ^{1} French Land Register data, which excludes lakes, ponds, glaciers > 1 km^{2} (0.386 sq mi or 247 acres) and river estuaries.

Saint-Victor-de-Morestel (French pronunciation: [sɛ̃ viktɔʁ də mɔʁɛstɛl], literally Saint-Victor of Morestel) is a commune in the Isère department in southeastern France.

== Demographics ==
Between 1975 and 2007, the population more than doubled.

Historical population

Year	Pop.	±% p.a.
1793	585	—
1821	724	+0.76%
1846	934	+1.02%
1872	963	+0.12%
1901	741	−0.90%
1926	611	−0.77%
1946	570	−0.35%
1962	541	−0.33%
1968	515	−0.82%

Year	Pop.	±% p.a.
1975	525	+0.28%
1982	637	+2.80%
1990	768	+2.37%
1999	849	+1.12%
2007	1,098	+3.27%
2012	1,105	+0.13%
2017	1,092	−0.24%
2023	1,168	+1.13%

Source: EHESS and INSEE (1968-2023)

== History ==
Until 1789 the commune was a parish of Morestel.

== Points of Interest ==
- Haut-Rhône National Nature Reserve

== Notable people ==
- Émile_Trolliet (1856-1903), poet.

== See also ==
- Communes of the Isère department
