= Soleymieu =

Soleymieu Solemmiô (Arpitan)
- Commune
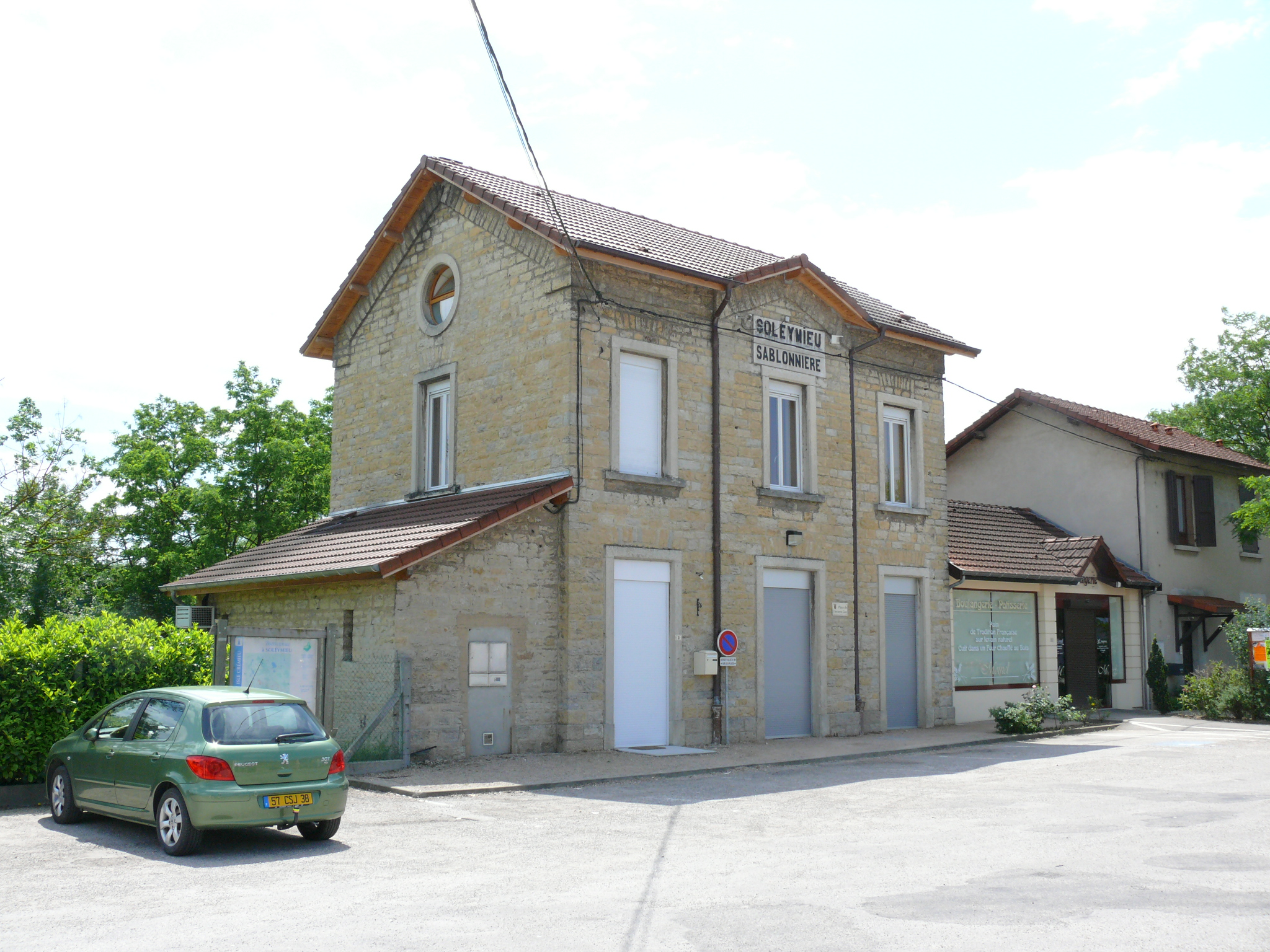
- Former train station

- Coat of arms
- Location of Soleymieu
- Location within France Location within Auvergne-Rhône-Alpes
- Coordinates: 45°42′38″N 5°21′02″E
- Country: France
- Region: Auvergne-Rhône-Alpes
- Department: Isère
- Arrondissement: La Tour-du-Pin
- Canton: Morestel
- Intercommunality: Les Balcons du Dauphiné

Government
  - Mayor (2021–2026): Stephane Bouchex-Bellomie
- Area^{1}: 13.36 km^{2} (5.16 sq mi)
- Elevation: 280 m (920 ft)
- Highest elevation: 363 m (1,191 ft)
- Lowest elevation: 221 m (725 ft)
- Population (2023): 895
  - Density: 67.0/km^{2} (174/sq mi)
- Time zone: UTC+01:00 (CET)
  - Summer (DST): UTC+02:00 (CEST)
- INSEE/Postal code: 38494 /38460
- ^{1} French Land Register data, which excludes lakes, ponds, glaciers > 1 km^{2} (0.386 sq mi or 247 acres) and river estuaries.

Soleymieu (French pronunciation: [sɔlɛmjø]; Arpitan: Solemmiô) is a commune in the Isère department in southeastern France.

== Population ==
Historical population
Year	Pop.	±% p.a.
1968	277	—
1975	274	−0.16%
1982	377	+4.66%
1990	434	+1.78%
1999	574	+3.16%
2007	672	+1.99%
2012	733	+1.75%
2017	777	+1.17%
2023	895	+2.38%
Source: INSEE

== See also ==
- Communes of the Isère department
