= Parmilieu =

- Commune
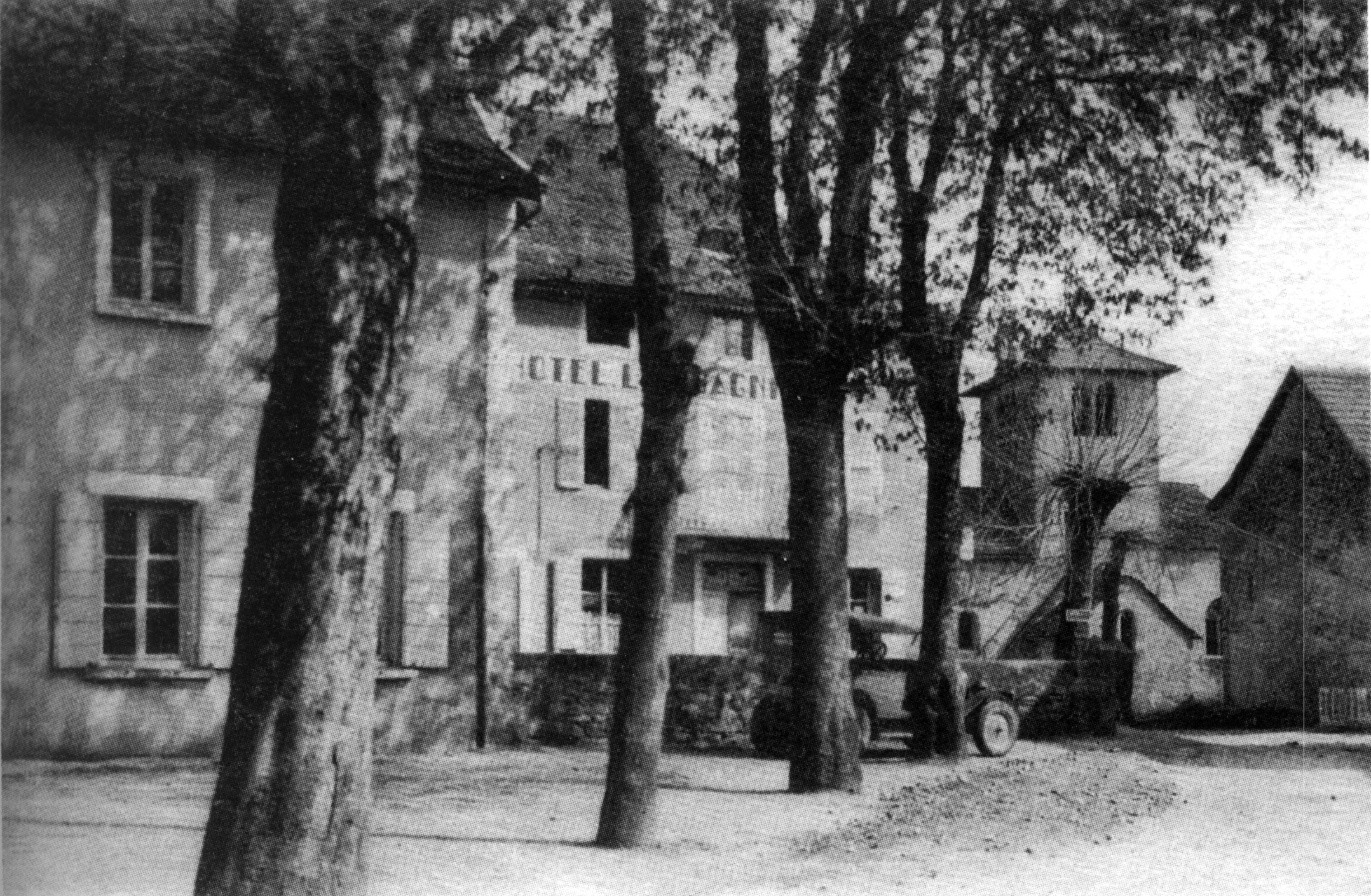
- Parmilieu around 1930
- Location of Parmilieu
- Location within France Location within Auvergne-Rhône-Alpes
- Coordinates: 45°50′28″N 5°21′20″E
- Country: France
- Region: Auvergne-Rhône-Alpes
- Department: Isère
- Arrondissement: La Tour-du-Pin
- Canton: Morestel

Government
  - Mayor (2020–2026): Éric Teruel
- Area^{1}: 12.83 km^{2} (4.95 sq mi)
- Highest elevation: 442 m (1,450 ft)
- Lowest elevation: 235 m (771 ft)
- Population (2023): 723
  - Density: 56.4/km^{2} (146/sq mi)
- Time zone: UTC+01:00 (CET)
  - Summer (DST): UTC+02:00 (CEST)
- INSEE/Postal code: 38295 /38390
- ^{1} French Land Register data, which excludes lakes, ponds, glaciers > 1 km^{2} (0.386 sq mi or 247 acres) and river estuaries.

Parmilieu (French pronunciation: [paʁmiljø]) is a commune in the Isère department in southeastern France.

== Population ==
Historical population
Year	Pop.	±% p.a.
1968	362	—
1975	331	−1.27%
1982	362	+1.29%
1990	377	+0.51%
1999	420	+1.21%
2007	609	+4.75%
2012	662	+1.68%
2017	709	+1.38%
2023	723	+0.33%
Source: INSEE

== See also ==
- Communes of the Isère department
