= Corbelin =

- Commune
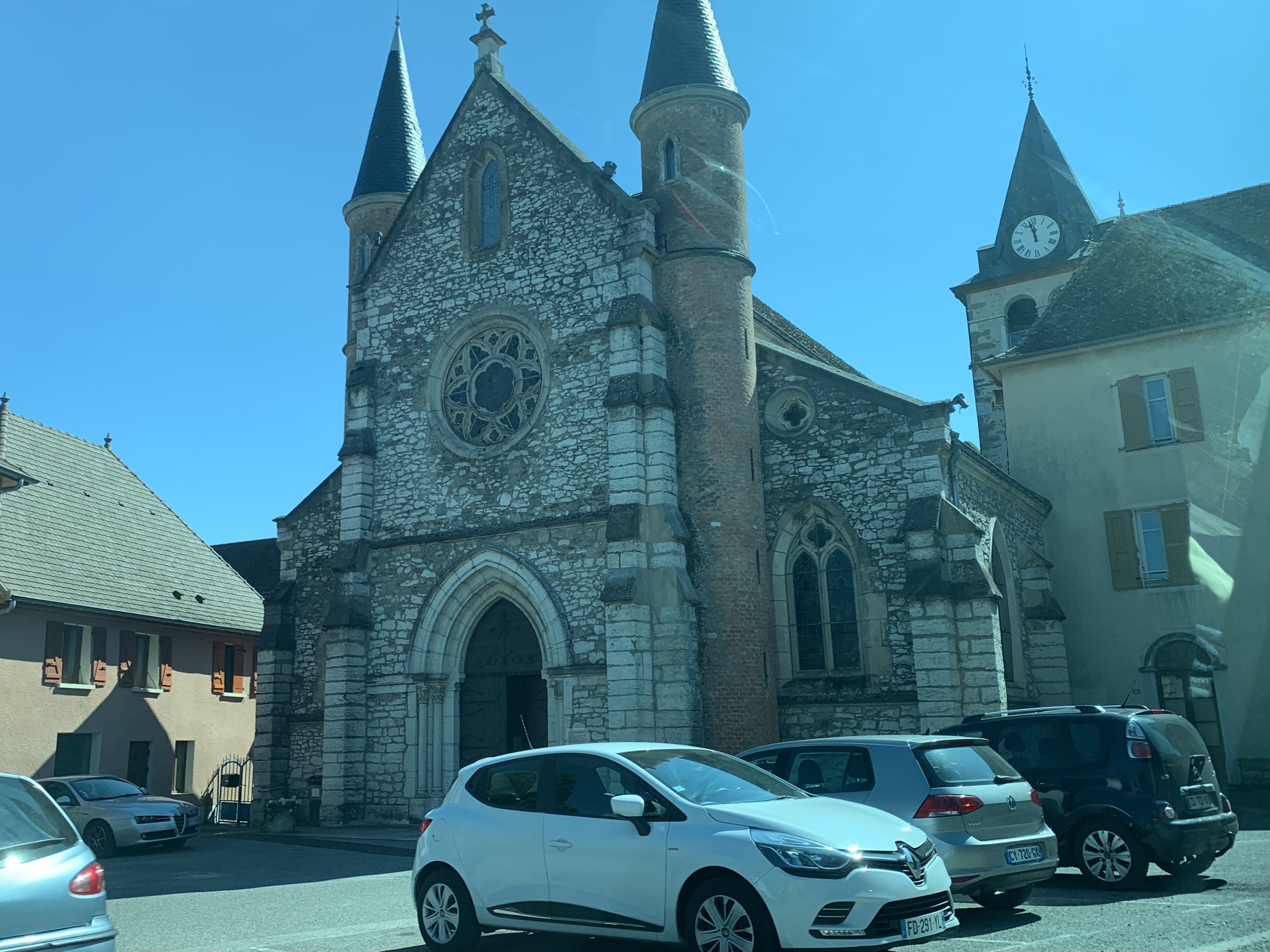
- Corbelin’s church

- Coat of arms
- Location of Corbelin
- Location within France Location within Auvergne-Rhône-Alpes
- Coordinates: 45°36′27″N 5°32′47″E
- Country: France
- Region: Auvergne-Rhône-Alpes
- Department: Isère
- Arrondissement: La Tour-du-Pin
- Canton: Morestel

Government
  - Mayor (2022–2026): Frédéric Gehin
- Area^{1}: 12 km^{2} (4.6 sq mi)
- Population (2023): 2,375
  - Density: 200/km^{2} (510/sq mi)
- Time zone: UTC+01:00 (CET)
  - Summer (DST): UTC+02:00 (CEST)
- INSEE/Postal code: 38124 /38630
- ^{1} French Land Register data, which excludes lakes, ponds, glaciers > 1 km^{2} (0.386 sq mi or 247 acres) and river estuaries.

Corbelin (French pronunciation: [kɔʁbəlɛ̃]) is a commune in the Isère department in southeastern France.

== Population ==
Historical population

| Year | Pop. | ±% p.a. |
|---|---|---|
| 1793 | 1,496 | — |
| 1800 | 1,545 | +0.46% |
| 1806 | 1,705 | +1.66% |
| 1821 | 1,623 | −0.33% |
| 1831 | 1,801 | +1.05% |
| 1836 | 1,808 | +0.08% |
| 1841 | 1,775 | −0.37% |
| 1846 | 1,817 | +0.47% |
| 1851 | 1,998 | +1.92% |
| 1856 | 1,990 | −0.08% |
| 1861 | 1,965 | −0.25% |
| 1866 | 2,076 | +1.11% |
| 1872 | 2,132 | +0.44% |
| 1876 | 2,173 | +0.48% |
| 1881 | 2,194 | +0.19% |
| 1886 | 2,208 | +0.13% |
| 1891 | 2,095 | −1.05% |
| 1896 | 2,173 | +0.73% |
| 1901 | 2,215 | +0.38% |

| Year | Pop. | ±% p.a. |
|---|---|---|
| 1906 | 2,280 | +0.58% |
| 1911 | 2,281 | +0.01% |
| 1921 | 2,008 | −1.27% |
| 1926 | 1,873 | −1.38% |
| 1931 | 1,772 | −1.10% |
| 1936 | 1,729 | −0.49% |
| 1946 | 1,674 | −0.32% |
| 1954 | 1,672 | −0.01% |
| 1962 | 1,606 | −0.50% |
| 1968 | 1,547 | −0.62% |
| 1975 | 1,612 | +0.59% |
| 1982 | 1,723 | +0.96% |
| 1990 | 1,799 | +0.54% |
| 1999 | 1,752 | −0.29% |
| 2007 | 2,039 | +1.91% |
| 2012 | 2,177 | +1.32% |
| 2017 | 2,235 | +0.53% |
| 2023 | 2,375 | +1.02% |

Source: EHESS and INSEE (1968-2023)

== See also ==
- Communes of the Isère department
