= Courtenay, Isère =

Courtenay
- Commune
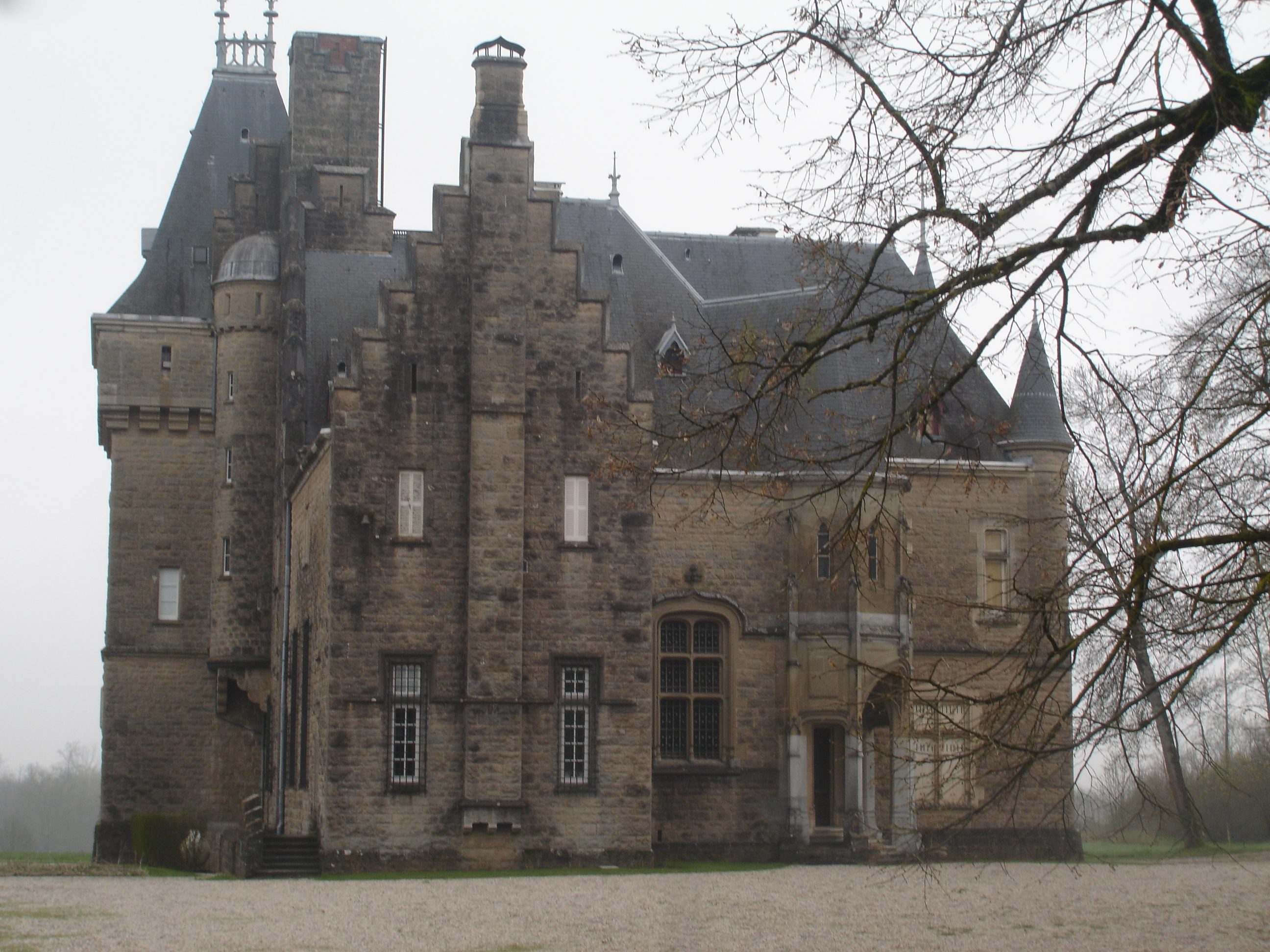
- The château of Courtenay-Lancin
- Location of Courtenay
- Location within France Location within Auvergne-Rhône-Alpes
- Coordinates: 45°44′N 5°23′E
- Country: France
- Region: Auvergne-Rhône-Alpes
- Department: Isère
- Arrondissement: La Tour-du-Pin
- Canton: Morestel
- Intercommunality: Les Balcons du Dauphiné

Government
  - Mayor (2020–2026): Stéphane Lefevre
- Area^{1}: 32.08 km^{2} (12.39 sq mi)
- Elevation: 352 m (1,155 ft)
- Highest elevation: 375 m (1,230 ft)
- Lowest elevation: 219 m (719 ft)
- Population (2023): 1,277
  - Density: 39.81/km^{2} (103.1/sq mi)
- Time zone: UTC+01:00 (CET)
  - Summer (DST): UTC+02:00 (CEST)
- INSEE/Postal code: 38135 /38510
- ^{1} French Land Register data, which excludes lakes, ponds, glaciers > 1 km^{2} (0.386 sq mi or 247 acres) and river estuaries.

Courtenay (French pronunciation: [kuʁtənɛ]) is a commune in the Isère department in southeastern France.

== Population ==
Historical population
| Year | Pop. | ±% p.a. |
|---|---|---|
| 1968 | 608 | — |
| 1975 | 550 | −1.42% |
| 1982 | 637 | +2.12% |
| 1990 | 667 | +0.58% |
| 1999 | 739 | +1.15% |
| 2007 | 1,084 | +4.91% |
| 2012 | 1,246 | +2.82% |
| 2017 | 1,276 | +0.48% |
| 2023 | 1,277 | +0.01% |
Source: INSEE

== See also ==
- Communes of the Isère department
