= Vignieu =

- Commune
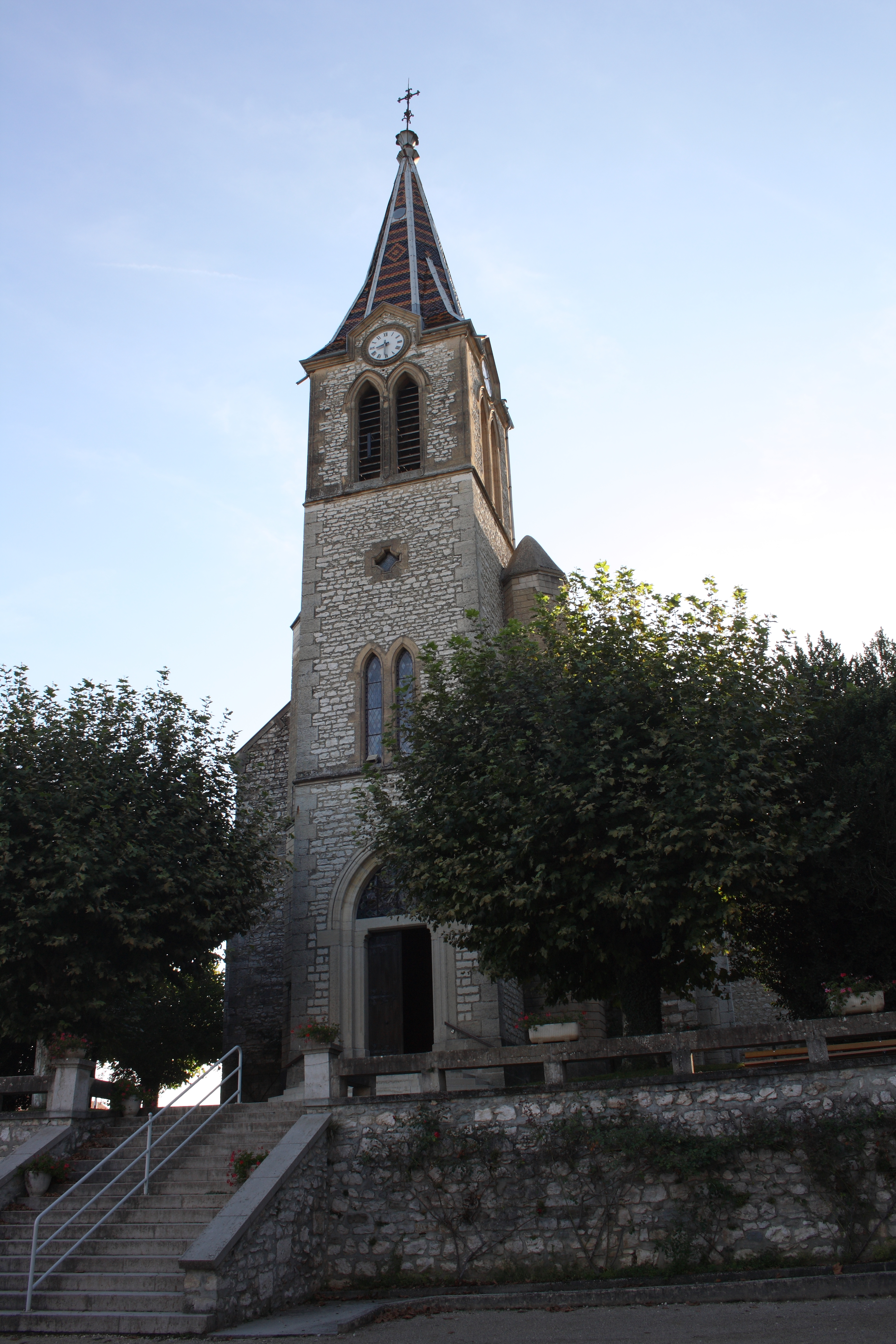
- The church of Vignieu

- Coat of arms
- Location of Vignieu
- Location within France Location within Auvergne-Rhône-Alpes
- Coordinates: 45°37′45″N 5°25′31″E
- Country: France
- Region: Auvergne-Rhône-Alpes
- Department: Isère
- Arrondissement: La Tour-du-Pin
- Canton: Morestel

Government
  - Mayor (2021–2026): Camille Regnier
- Area^{1}: 9.4 km^{2} (3.6 sq mi)
- Elevation: 330 m (1,080 ft)
- Highest elevation: 444 m (1,457 ft)
- Lowest elevation: 220 m (720 ft)
- Population (2023): 1,024
  - Density: 110/km^{2} (280/sq mi)
- Time zone: UTC+01:00 (CET)
  - Summer (DST): UTC+02:00 (CEST)
- INSEE/Postal code: 38546 /38890
- ^{1} French Land Register data, which excludes lakes, ponds, glaciers > 1 km^{2} (0.386 sq mi or 247 acres) and river estuaries.

Vignieu (French pronunciation: [viɲø]) is a commune in the Isère department in southeastern France.

== Population ==
Historical population
| Year | Pop. | ±% p.a. |
|---|---|---|
| 1968 | 412 | — |
| 1975 | 385 | −0.96% |
| 1982 | 502 | +3.86% |
| 1990 | 592 | +2.08% |
| 1999 | 706 | +1.98% |
| 2007 | 845 | +2.27% |
| 2012 | 970 | +2.80% |
| 2017 | 1,015 | +0.91% |
| 2023 | 1,024 | +0.15% |
Source: INSEE

== See also ==
- Communes of the Isère department
