= Brangues =

- Commune
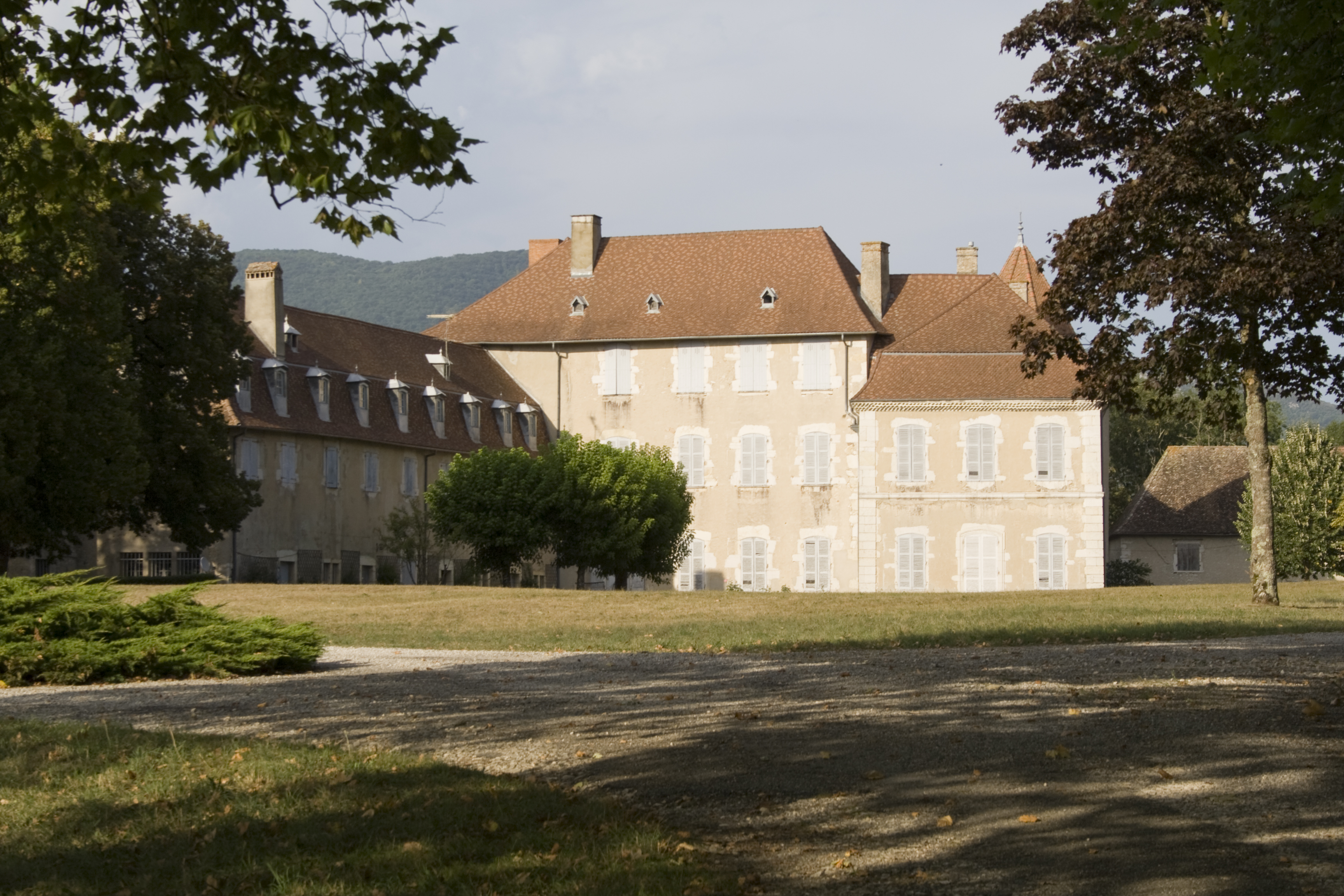
- Chateau
- Location of Brangues
- Location within France Location within Auvergne-Rhône-Alpes
- Coordinates: 45°41′38″N 5°31′55″E
- Country: France
- Region: Auvergne-Rhône-Alpes
- Department: Isère
- Arrondissement: La Tour-du-Pin
- Canton: Morestel

Government
  - Mayor (2020–2026): Sylvain Granger
- Area^{1}: 11.67 km^{2} (4.51 sq mi)
- Elevation: 207 m (679 ft)
- Highest elevation: 236 m (774 ft)
- Lowest elevation: 204 m (669 ft)
- Population (2023): 614
  - Density: 52.6/km^{2} (136/sq mi)
- Time zone: UTC+01:00 (CET)
  - Summer (DST): UTC+02:00 (CEST)
- INSEE/Postal code: 38055 /38510
- ^{1} French Land Register data, which excludes lakes, ponds, glaciers > 1 km^{2} (0.386 sq mi or 247 acres) and river estuaries.

Brangues (French pronunciation: [bʁɑ̃ɡ]) is a commune in the Isère department in southeastern France.

== Population ==
Historical population

Year	Pop.	±% p.a.
1793	692	—
1821	775	+0.41%
1851	919	+0.57%
1872	843	−0.41%
1901	639	−0.95%
1921	543	−0.81%
1946	501	−0.32%
1954	467	−0.87%
1962	395	−2.07%

Year	Pop.	±% p.a.
1968	363	−1.40%
1975	348	−0.60%
1982	369	+0.84%
1990	388	+0.63%
1999	469	+2.13%
2007	566	+2.38%
2012	600	+1.17%
2017	626	+0.85%
2023	614	−0.32%

Source: EHESS and INSEE

== See also ==
- Communes of the Isère department
