= Sermérieu =

Sermérieu Sarmèriô (Arpitan)
- Commune
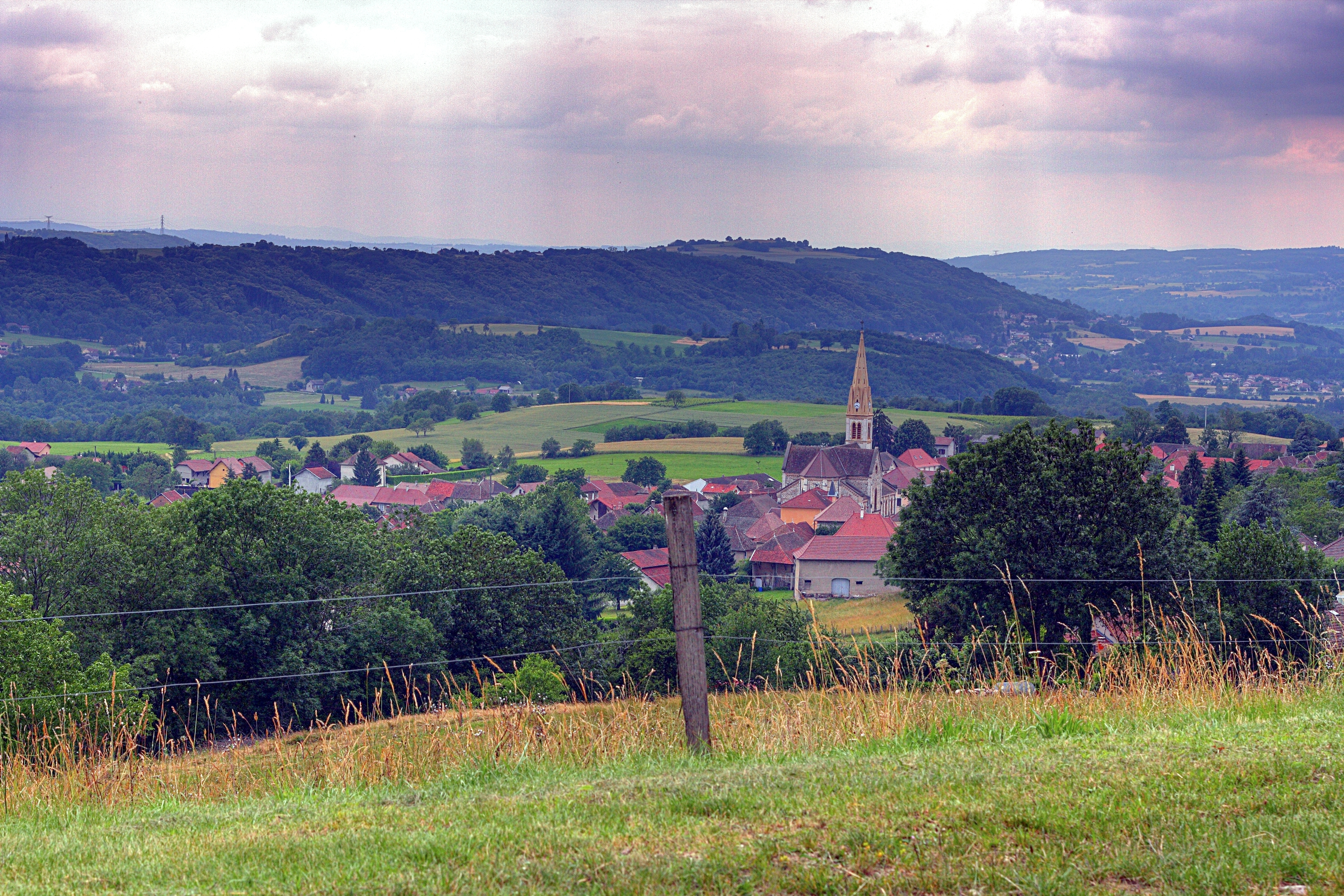
- A general view of Sermérieu
- Location of Sermérieu
- Location within France Location within Auvergne-Rhône-Alpes
- Coordinates: 45°40′20″N 5°24′36″E
- Country: France
- Region: Auvergne-Rhône-Alpes
- Department: Isère
- Arrondissement: La Tour-du-Pin
- Canton: Morestel

Government
  - Mayor (2020–2026): Alexandre Bolleau
- Area^{1}: 17.14 km^{2} (6.62 sq mi)
- Elevation: 298 m (978 ft)
- Highest elevation: 385 m (1,263 ft)
- Lowest elevation: 223 m (732 ft)
- Population (2023): 1,638
  - Density: 95.57/km^{2} (247.5/sq mi)
- Time zone: UTC+01:00 (CET)
  - Summer (DST): UTC+02:00 (CEST)
- INSEE/Postal code: 38483 /38510
- ^{1} French Land Register data, which excludes lakes, ponds, glaciers > 1 km^{2} (0.386 sq mi or 247 acres) and river estuaries.

Sermérieu (French pronunciation: [sɛʁmeʁjø]; Arpitan: Sarmèriô) is a commune in the Isère department in southeastern France.

== Population ==
Historical population
Year	Pop.	±% p.a.
1968	639	—
1975	588	−1.18%
1982	756	+3.66%
1990	935	+2.69%
1999	1,168	+2.50%
2007	1,441	+2.66%
2012	1,493	+0.71%
2017	1,668	+2.24%
2023	1,638	−0.30%
Source: INSEE

== See also ==
- Communes of the Isère department
