= Saint-Sorlin-de-Morestel =

- Commune
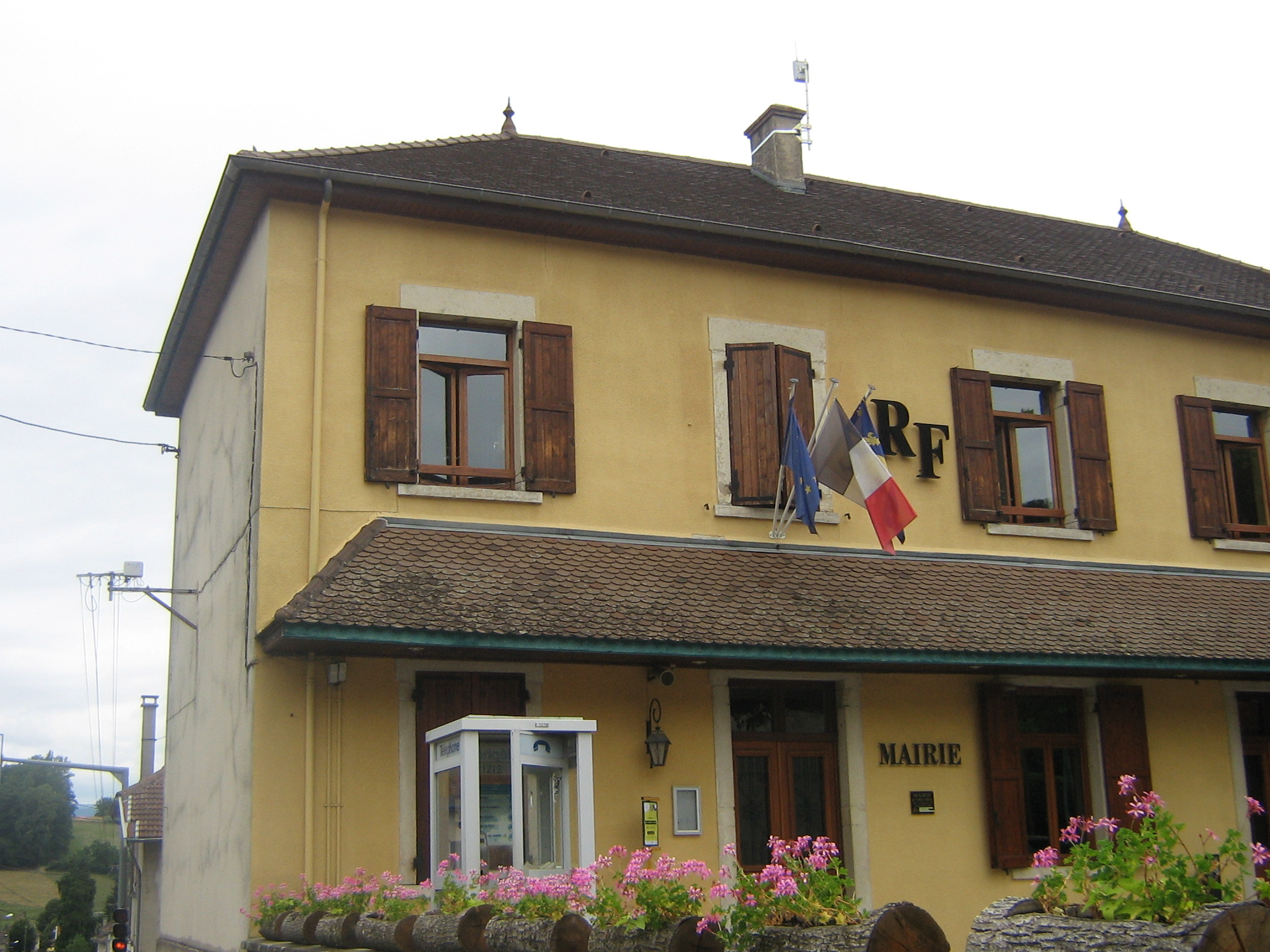
- Town hall
- Location of Saint-Sorlin-de-Morestel
- Location within France Location within Auvergne-Rhône-Alpes
- Coordinates: 45°38′16″N 5°28′38″E
- Country: France
- Region: Auvergne-Rhône-Alpes
- Department: Isère
- Arrondissement: La Tour-du-Pin
- Canton: Morestel

Government
  - Mayor (2020–2026): Nicole Genin
- Area^{1}: 5.38 km^{2} (2.08 sq mi)
- Elevation: 280 m (920 ft)
- Highest elevation: 419 m (1,375 ft)
- Lowest elevation: 220 m (720 ft)
- Population (2023): 610
  - Density: 110/km^{2} (290/sq mi)
- Time zone: UTC+01:00 (CET)
  - Summer (DST): UTC+02:00 (CEST)
- INSEE/Postal code: 38458 /38510
- ^{1} French Land Register data, which excludes lakes, ponds, glaciers > 1 km^{2} (0.386 sq mi or 247 acres) and river estuaries.

Saint-Sorlin-de-Morestel (French pronunciation: [sɛ̃ sɔʁlɛ̃ də mɔʁɛstɛl], literally Saint-Sorlin of Morestel) is a commune in the Isère department in southeastern France.

== Population ==
Historical population
Year	Pop.	±% p.a.
1968	338	—
1975	316	−0.96%
1982	388	+2.98%
1990	423	+1.09%
1999	448	+0.64%
2007	541	+2.39%
2012	557	+0.58%
2017	627	+2.40%
2023	610	−0.46%
Source: INSEE

== See also ==
- Communes of the Isère department
