= Le Bouchage, Isère =

Le Bouchage
- Commune
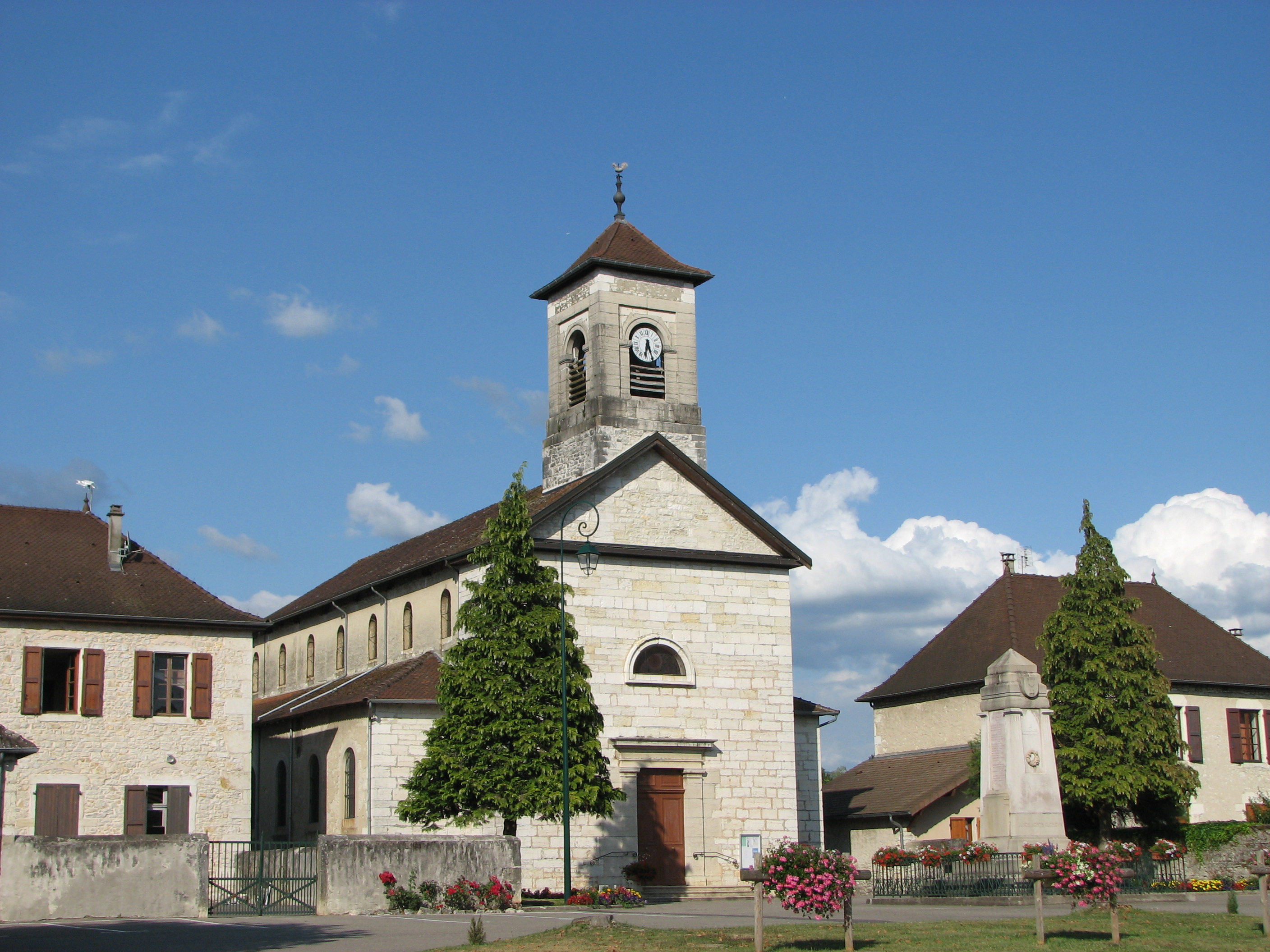
- The church of Le Bouchage
- Location of Le Bouchage
- Location within France Location within Auvergne-Rhône-Alpes
- Coordinates: 45°40′16″N 5°31′36″E
- Country: France
- Region: Auvergne-Rhône-Alpes
- Department: Isère
- Arrondissement: La Tour-du-Pin
- Canton: Morestel

Government
  - Mayor (2020–2026): Annie Pourtier
- Area^{1}: 11.2 km^{2} (4.3 sq mi)
- Elevation: 209 m (686 ft)
- Highest elevation: 210 m (690 ft)
- Lowest elevation: 207 m (679 ft)
- Population (2023): 655
  - Density: 58.5/km^{2} (151/sq mi)
- Time zone: UTC+01:00 (CET)
  - Summer (DST): UTC+02:00 (CEST)
- INSEE/Postal code: 38050 /38510
- ^{1} French Land Register data, which excludes lakes, ponds, glaciers > 1 km^{2} (0.386 sq mi or 247 acres) and river estuaries.

Le Bouchage (French pronunciation: [lə buʃaʒ]) is a commune in the Isère department in southeastern France.

== Population ==
Historical population
Year	Pop.	±% p.a.
1968	384	—
1975	334	−1.97%
1982	397	+2.50%
1990	424	+0.83%
1999	462	+0.96%
2007	561	+2.46%
2012	592	+1.08%
2017	623	+1.03%
2023	655	+0.84%
Source: INSEE

== See also ==
- Communes of the Isère department
