= Arandon-Passins =

- Commune
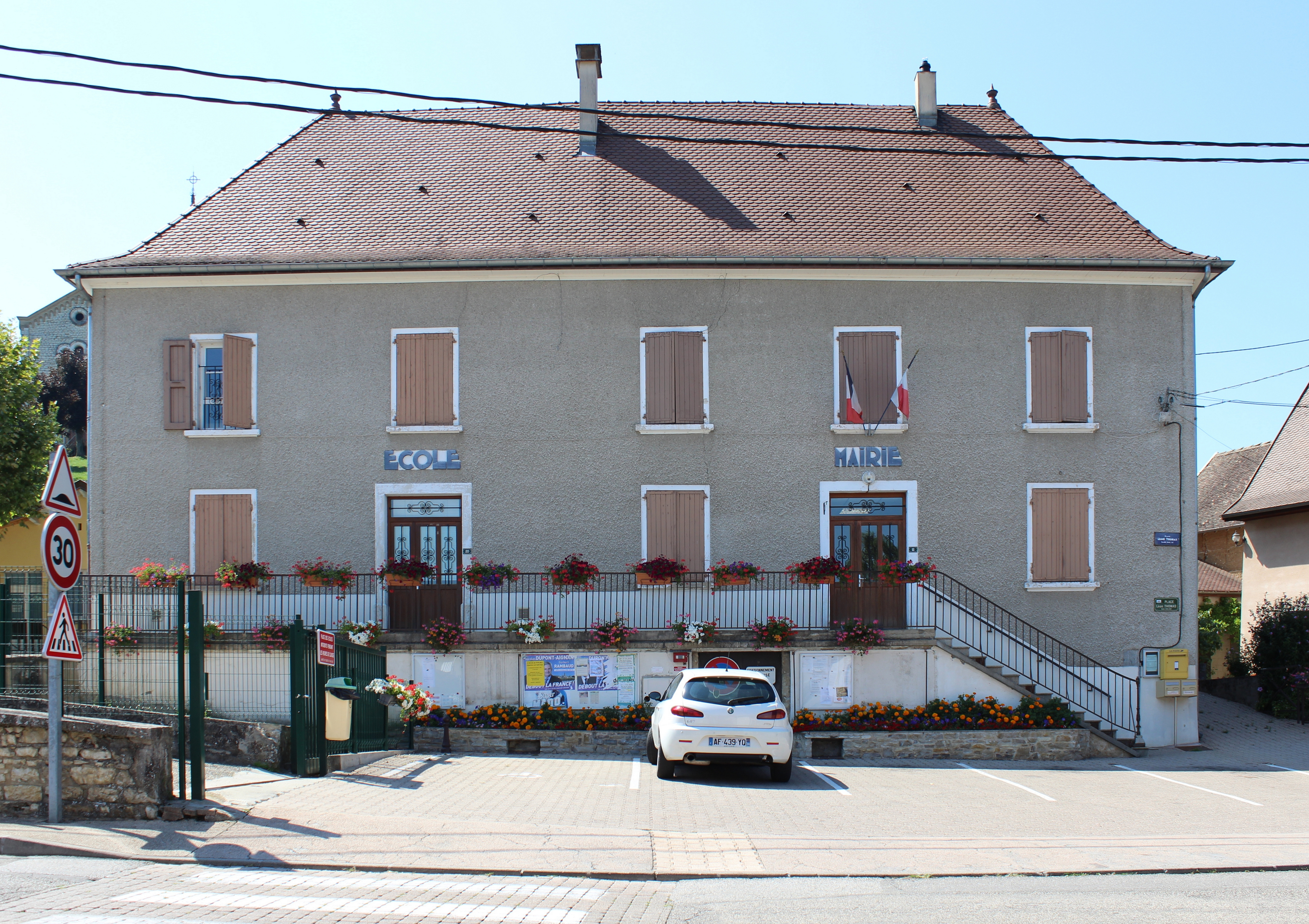
- The town hall of Passins
- Location of Arandon-Passins
- Location within France Location within Auvergne-Rhône-Alpes
- Coordinates: 45°41′20″N 5°25′48″E
- Country: France
- Region: Auvergne-Rhône-Alpes
- Department: Isère
- Arrondissement: La Tour-du-Pin
- Canton: Morestel
- Intercommunality: Les Balcons du Dauphiné

Government
  - Mayor (2020–2026): Maria Sandrin
- Area^{1}: 26.14 km^{2} (10.09 sq mi)
- Population (2023): 1,864
  - Density: 71.31/km^{2} (184.7/sq mi)
- Time zone: UTC+01:00 (CET)
  - Summer (DST): UTC+02:00 (CEST)
- INSEE/Postal code: 38297 /38510
- ^{1} French Land Register data, which excludes lakes, ponds, glaciers > 1 km^{2} (0.386 sq mi or 247 acres) and river estuaries.

Arandon-Passins (French pronunciation: [aʁɑ̃dɔ̃ pasɛ̃]) is a commune in the department of Isère, southeastern France. The municipality was established on 1 January 2017 by merger of the former communes of Passins (the seat) and Arandon.

== See also ==
- Communes of the Isère department
