= Montalieu-Vercieu =

- Commune
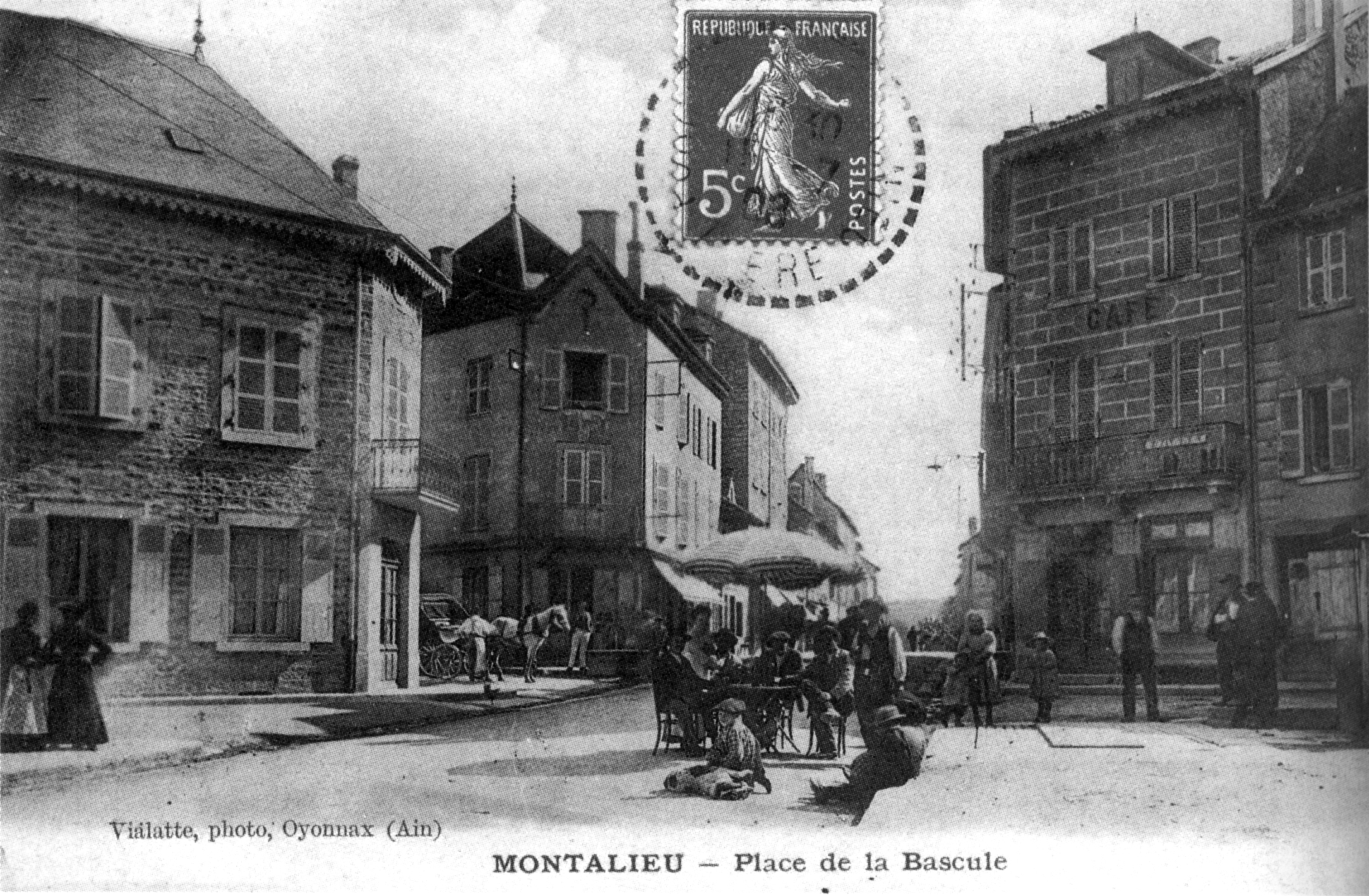
- Montalieu in 1908

- Coat of arms
- Location of Montalieu-Vercieu
- Location within France Location within Auvergne-Rhône-Alpes
- Coordinates: 45°48′54″N 5°24′16″E
- Country: France
- Region: Auvergne-Rhône-Alpes
- Department: Isère
- Arrondissement: La Tour-du-Pin
- Canton: Morestel

Government
  - Mayor (2020–2026): Christian Giroud
- Area^{1}: 8.66 km^{2} (3.34 sq mi)
- Highest elevation: 347 m (1,138 ft)
- Lowest elevation: 200 m (660 ft)
- Population (2023): 3,510
  - Density: 405/km^{2} (1,050/sq mi)
- Time zone: UTC+01:00 (CET)
  - Summer (DST): UTC+02:00 (CEST)
- INSEE/Postal code: 38247 /38390
- ^{1} French Land Register data, which excludes lakes, ponds, glaciers > 1 km^{2} (0.386 sq mi or 247 acres) and river estuaries.

Montalieu-Vercieu (French pronunciation: [mɔ̃taljø vɛʁsjø]) is a commune in the Isère department in southeastern France.

== Population ==
Historical population

Year	Pop.	±% p.a.
1793	498	—
1800	383	−3.68%
1806	807	+13.23%
1821	678	−1.15%
1831	907	+2.95%
1836	1,032	+2.62%
1841	1,274	+4.30%
1846	1,507	+3.42%
1851	1,506	−0.01%
1856	1,727	+2.78%
1861	1,768	+0.47%
1866	1,869	+1.12%
1872	1,771	−0.89%
1876	1,944	+2.36%
1881	1,955	+0.11%
1886	2,098	+1.42%
1891	2,023	−0.73%
1896	2,012	−0.11%
1901	2,125	+1.10%

Year	Pop.	±% p.a.
1906	2,077	−0.46%
1911	1,980	−0.95%
1921	1,683	−1.61%
1926	1,874	+2.17%
1931	2,050	+1.81%
1936	1,742	−3.20%
1946	1,561	−1.09%
1954	1,577	+0.13%
1962	1,754	+1.34%
1968	1,842	+0.82%
1975	1,756	−0.68%
1982	2,329	+4.12%
1990	2,076	−1.43%
1999	2,178	+0.53%
2007	2,717	+2.80%
2012	3,227	+3.50%
2017	3,368	+0.86%
2023	3,510	+0.69%

Source: EHESS and INSEE (1968-2023)

== Personalities ==
It is the birthplace of soprano Ninon Vallin.

== See also ==
- Communes of the Isère department
