= Vertrieu =

- Commune
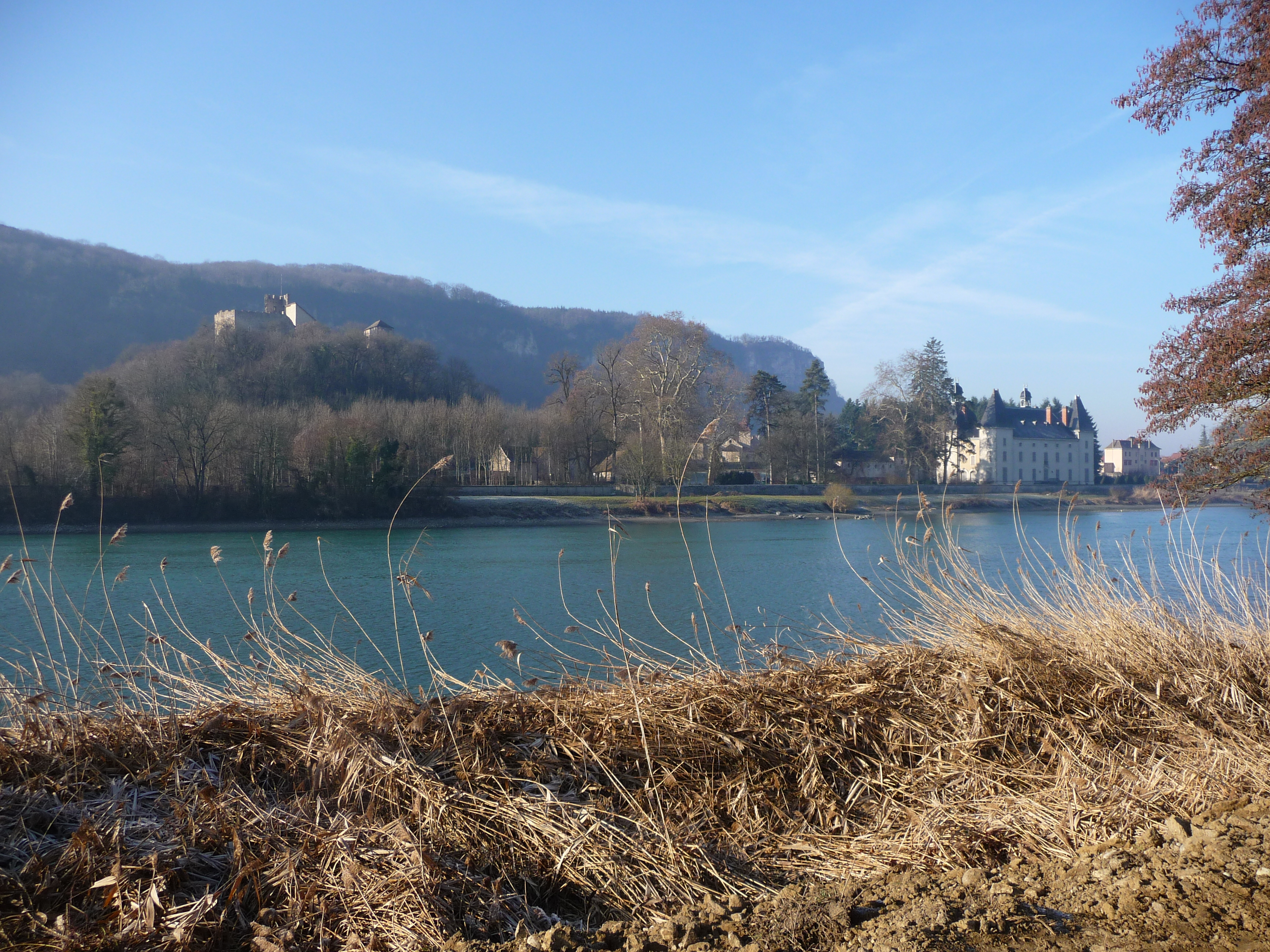
- The old chateau of Vertrieu
- Location of Vertrieu
- Location within France Location within Auvergne-Rhône-Alpes
- Coordinates: 45°52′27″N 5°22′03″E
- Country: France
- Region: Auvergne-Rhône-Alpes
- Department: Isère
- Arrondissement: La Tour-du-Pin
- Canton: Morestel

Government
  - Mayor (2020–2026): Francis Spitzner
- Area^{1}: 4.59 km^{2} (1.77 sq mi)
- Elevation: 200 m (660 ft)
- Highest elevation: 360 m (1,180 ft)
- Lowest elevation: 196 m (643 ft)
- Population (2023): 608
  - Density: 132/km^{2} (343/sq mi)
- Time zone: UTC+01:00 (CET)
  - Summer (DST): UTC+02:00 (CEST)
- INSEE/Postal code: 38539 /38390
- ^{1} French Land Register data, which excludes lakes, ponds, glaciers > 1 km^{2} (0.386 sq mi or 247 acres) and river estuaries.

Vertrieu (French pronunciation: [vɛʁtʁijø]) is a commune in the Isère department in southeastern France.

== Population ==
Historical population
Year	Pop.	±% p.a.
1968	263	—
1975	284	+1.10%
1982	344	+2.78%
1990	396	+1.78%
1999	469	+1.90%
2007	634	+3.84%
2012	661	+0.84%
2017	639	−0.67%
2023	608	−0.83%
Source: INSEE

== See also ==
- Communes of the Isère department
