= Creys-Mépieu =

- Commune
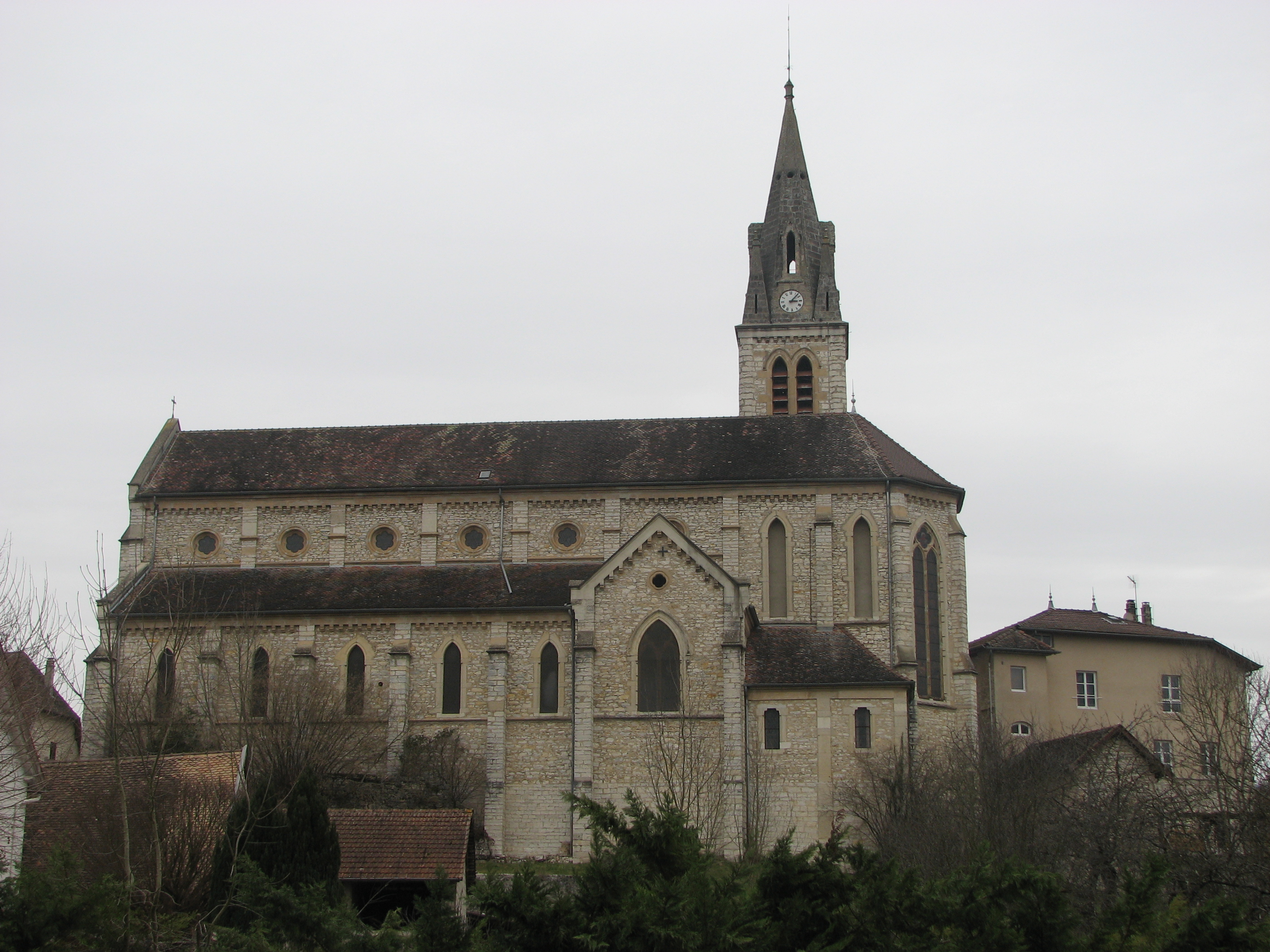
- The church of Creys
- Location of Creys-Mépieu
- Location within France Location within Auvergne-Rhône-Alpes
- Coordinates: 45°43′45″N 5°29′18″E
- Country: France
- Region: Auvergne-Rhône-Alpes
- Department: Isère
- Arrondissement: La Tour-du-Pin
- Canton: Morestel

Government
  - Mayor (2020–2026): Olivier Bonnard
- Area^{1}: 28.99 km^{2} (11.19 sq mi)
- Elevation: 260 m (850 ft)
- Highest elevation: 343 m (1,125 ft)
- Lowest elevation: 200 m (660 ft)
- Population (2023): 1,613
  - Density: 55.64/km^{2} (144.1/sq mi)
- Time zone: UTC+01:00 (CET)
  - Summer (DST): UTC+02:00 (CEST)
- INSEE/Postal code: 38139 /38510
- ^{1} French Land Register data, which excludes lakes, ponds, glaciers > 1 km^{2} (0.386 sq mi or 247 acres) and river estuaries.

Creys-Mépieu (French pronunciation: [kʁɛ mepjø]) is a commune in the Isère department in southeastern France.

Created by prefectural decree of August 11, 1994, Creys-Mépieu was made from the fusion of the communes of Creys-Pusignieu and Mépieu which had been associated since September 29, 1989.

== Gallery ==
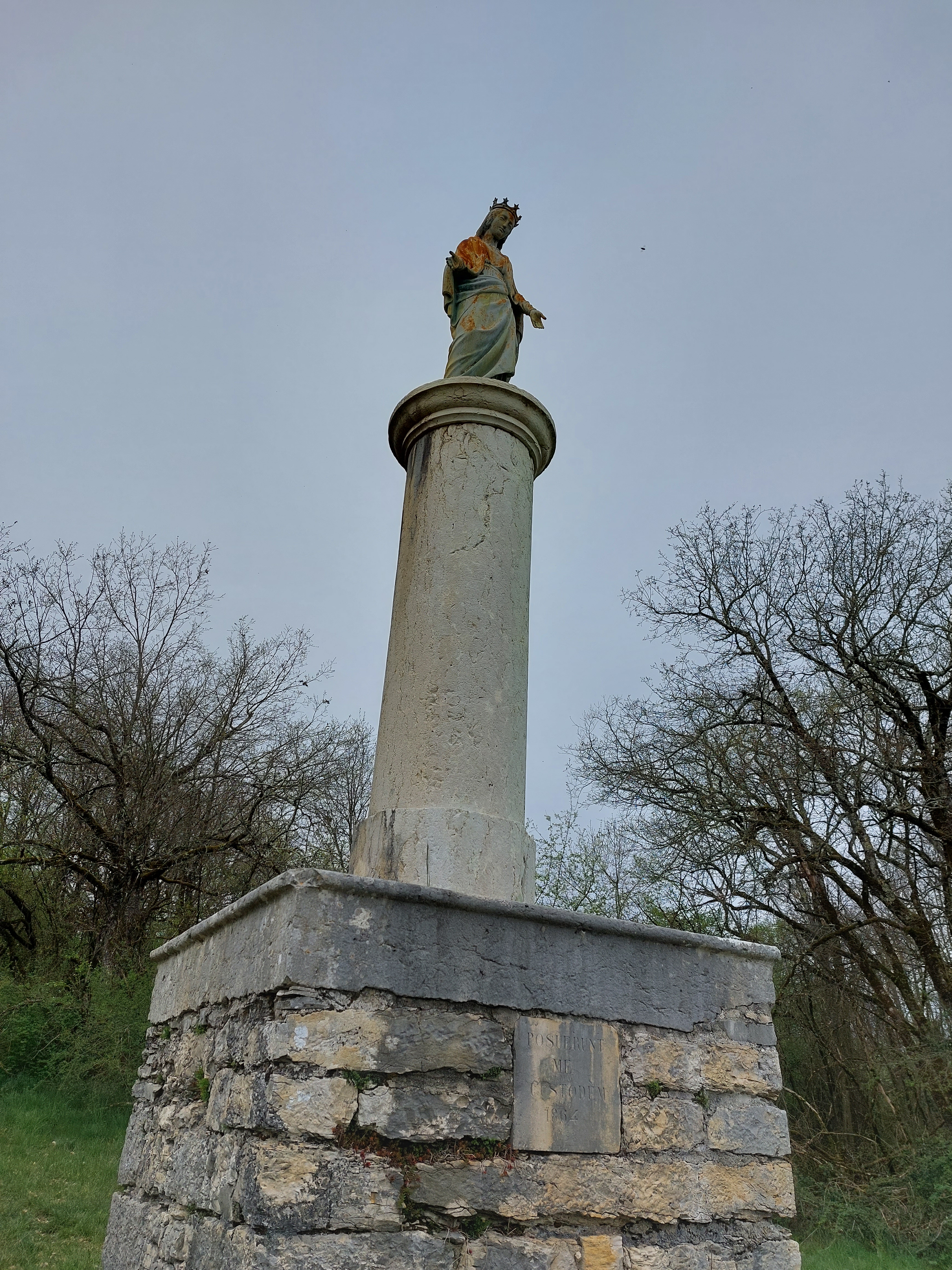
The statue dedicated to Mary, in Creys.

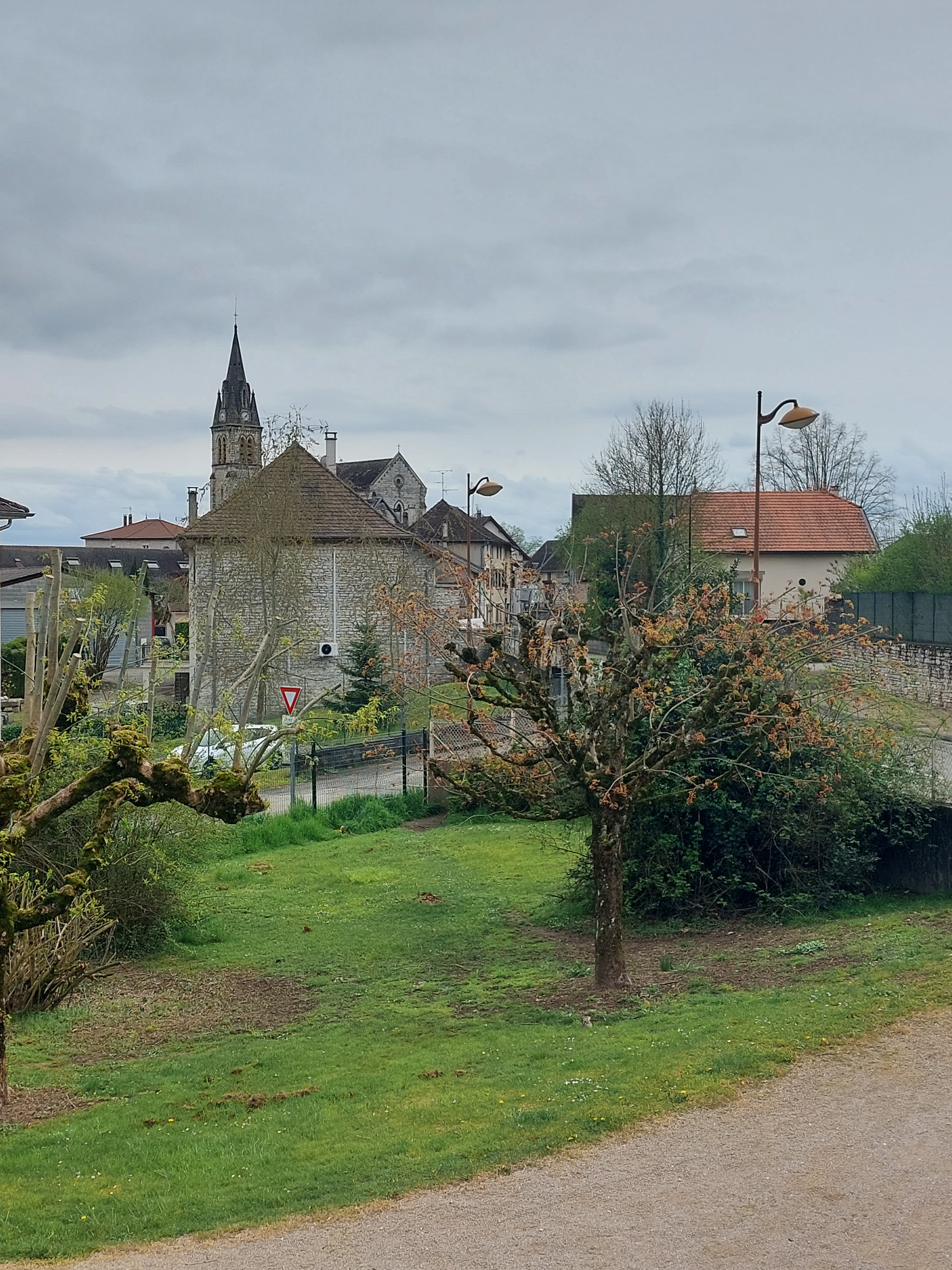
Creys.

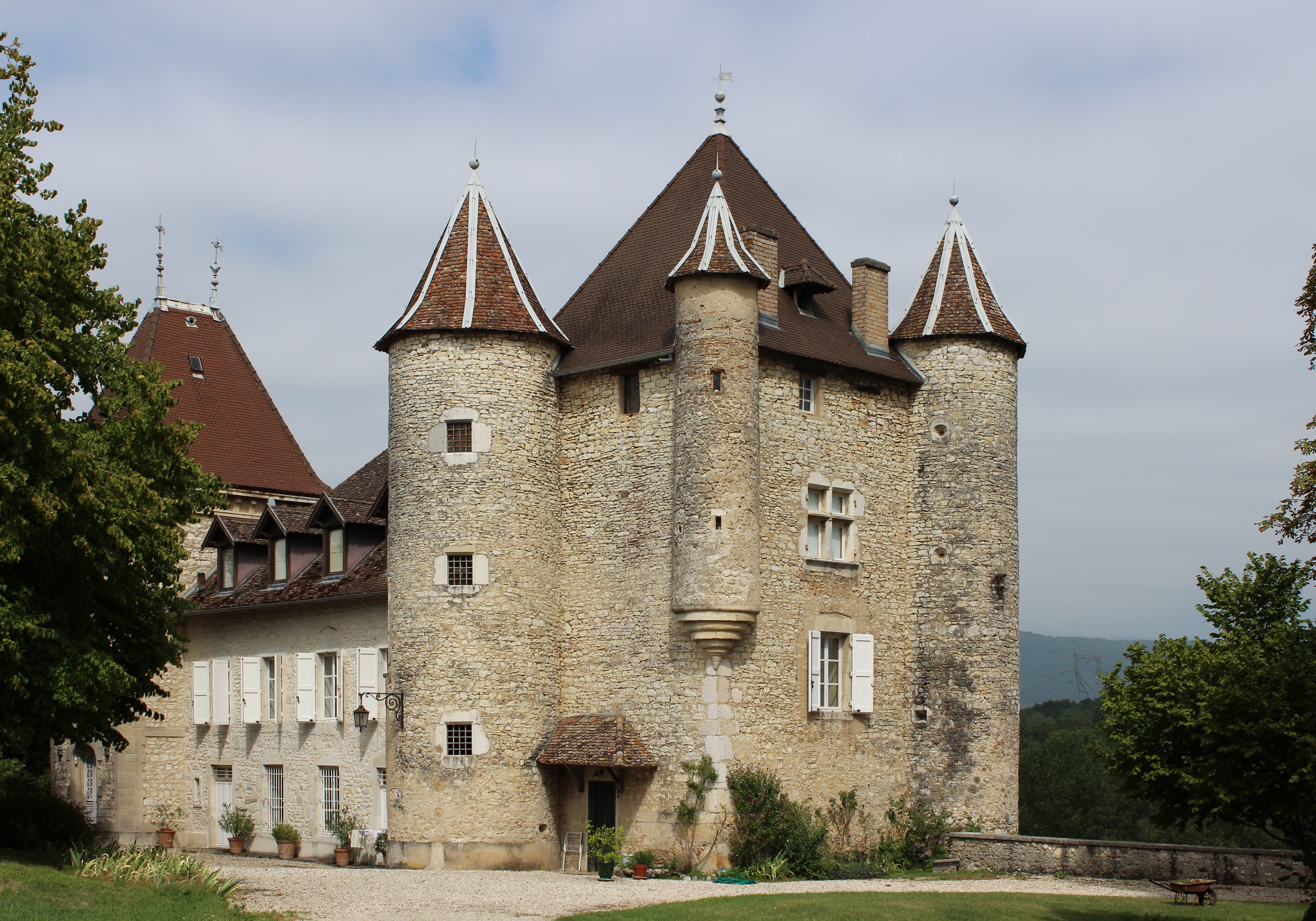
The castle of Mépieu.

== Population ==
Population data refer to the area corresponding with the commune as of January 2025.

Historical population
Year	Pop.	±% p.a.
1968	631	—
1975	596	−0.81%
1982	960	+7.05%
1990	959	−0.01%
1999	1,091	+1.44%
2007	1,323	+2.44%
2012	1,512	+2.71%
2017	1,503	−0.12%
2023	1,613	+1.18%
Source: INSEE

== See also ==
- Communes of the Isère department
