= Morestel =

- Commune
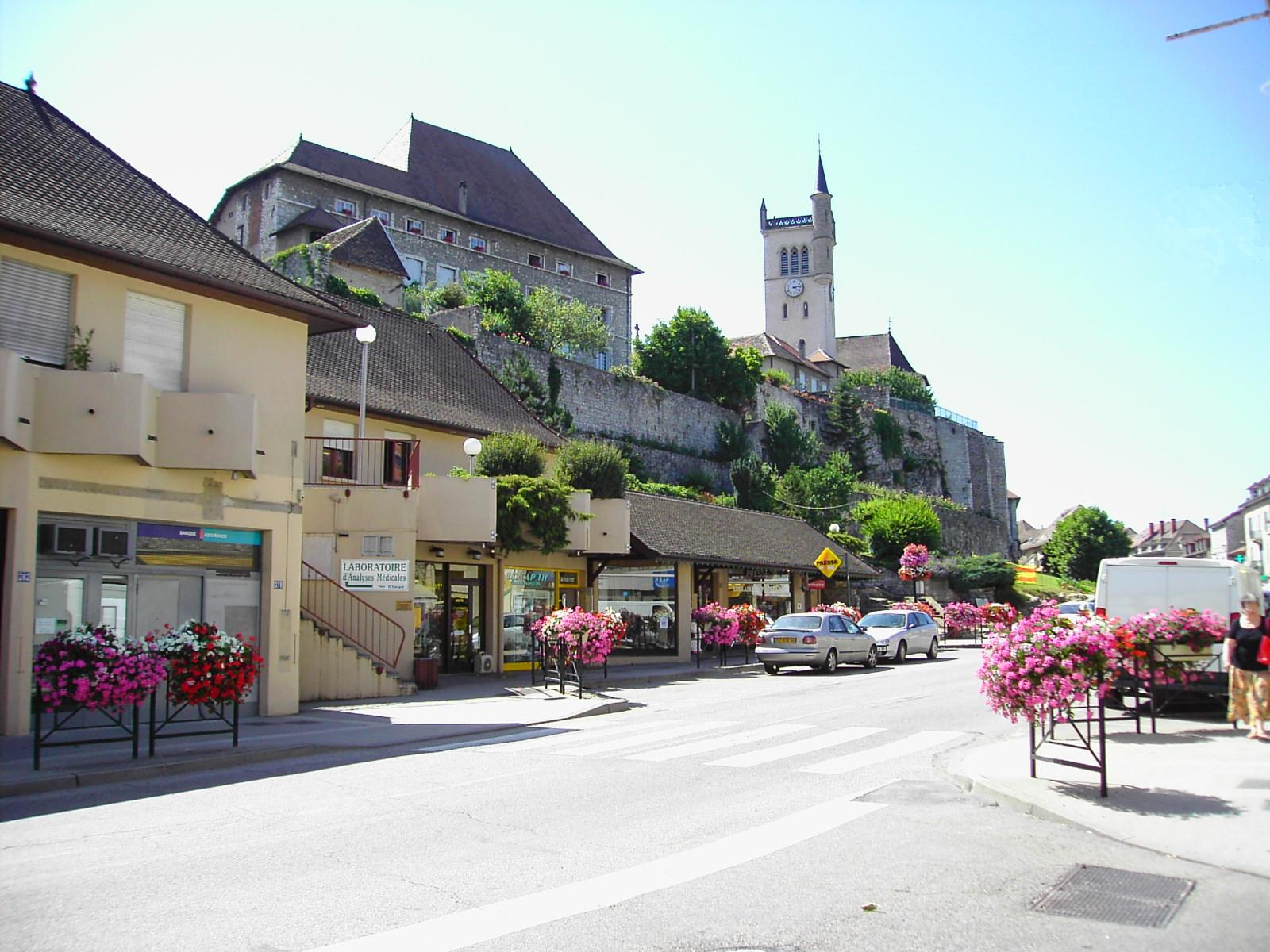
- The centre of Morestel

- Coat of arms
- Location of Morestel
- Location within France Location within Auvergne-Rhône-Alpes
- Coordinates: 45°40′43″N 5°28′15″E
- Country: France
- Region: Auvergne-Rhône-Alpes
- Department: Isère
- Arrondissement: La Tour-du-Pin
- Canton: Morestel
- Intercommunality: Les Balcons du Dauphiné

Government
  - Mayor (2020–2026): Frédéric Vial
- Area^{1}: 8.03 km^{2} (3.10 sq mi)
- Highest elevation: 319 m (1,047 ft)
- Lowest elevation: 205 m (673 ft)
- Population (2023): 4,340
  - Density: 540/km^{2} (1,400/sq mi)
- Time zone: UTC+01:00 (CET)
  - Summer (DST): UTC+02:00 (CEST)
- INSEE/Postal code: 38261 /38510
- ^{1} French Land Register data, which excludes lakes, ponds, glaciers > 1 km^{2} (0.386 sq mi or 247 acres) and river estuaries.

Morestel (French pronunciation: [mɔʁɛstɛl]; Arpitan: Mouretél) is a commune in the Isère department in south-eastern France.

== Geography ==
Morestel is situated on the old National Highway 75, now RD 1075, between Bourg-en-Bresse and Grenoble.

== Population ==
Historical population

Year	Pop.	±% p.a.
1793	875	—
1800	849	−0.43%
1806	936	+1.64%
1821	1,080	+0.96%
1831	1,326	+2.07%
1836	1,464	+2.00%
1841	1,390	−1.03%
1846	1,419	+0.41%
1851	1,437	+0.25%
1856	1,350	−1.24%
1861	1,358	+0.12%
1866	1,335	−0.34%
1872	1,296	−0.49%
1876	1,234	−1.22%
1881	1,234	+0.00%
1886	1,372	+2.14%
1891	1,446	+1.06%
1896	1,401	−0.63%
1901	1,331	−1.02%

Year	Pop.	±% p.a.
1906	1,479	+2.13%
1911	1,405	−1.02%
1921	1,323	−0.60%
1926	1,338	+0.23%
1931	1,270	−1.04%
1936	1,239	−0.49%
1946	1,285	+0.37%
1954	1,286	+0.01%
1962	1,455	+1.56%
1968	1,782	+3.44%
1975	2,308	+3.76%
1982	2,738	+2.47%
1990	2,972	+1.03%
1999	3,034	+0.23%
2007	3,978	+3.44%
2012	4,261	+1.38%
2017	4,469	+0.96%
2023	4,340	−0.49%

Source: EHESS and INSEE (1968-2023)

== See also ==
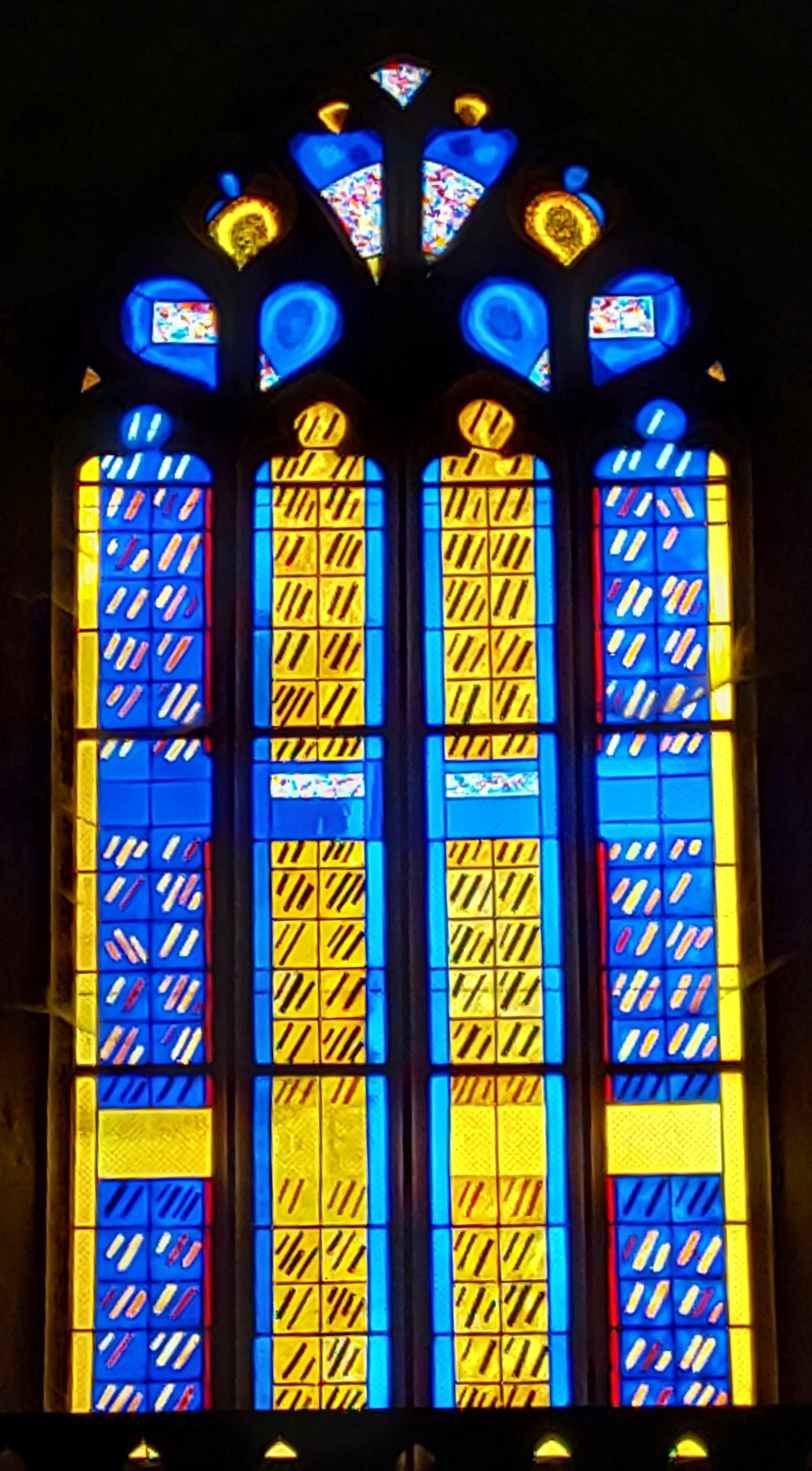
The stained glass of the parish church of saint Symphorianus.

- Communes of the Isère department
