= Canton of Morestel =

Canton of France

Coordinates: 45.68°N 5.47°E

The canton of Morestel is an administrative division of the Isère department, eastern France. Its borders were modified at the French canton reorganisation which came into effect in March 2015. Its seat is in Morestel.

It consists of the following communes:

1. Arandon-Passins
2. Les Avenières-Veyrins-Thuellin
3. La Balme-les-Grottes
4. Le Bouchage
5. Bouvesse-Quirieu
6. Brangues
7. Charette
8. Corbelin
9. Courtenay
10. Creys-Mépieu
11. Montalieu-Vercieu
12. Morestel
13. Optevoz
14. Parmilieu
15. Porcieu-Amblagnieu
16. Saint-Sorlin-de-Morestel
17. Saint-Victor-de-Morestel
18. Sermérieu
19. Soleymieu
20. Vasselin
21. Vertrieu
22. Vézeronce-Curtin
23. Vignieu
