= Charette, Isère =

Charette
- Commune
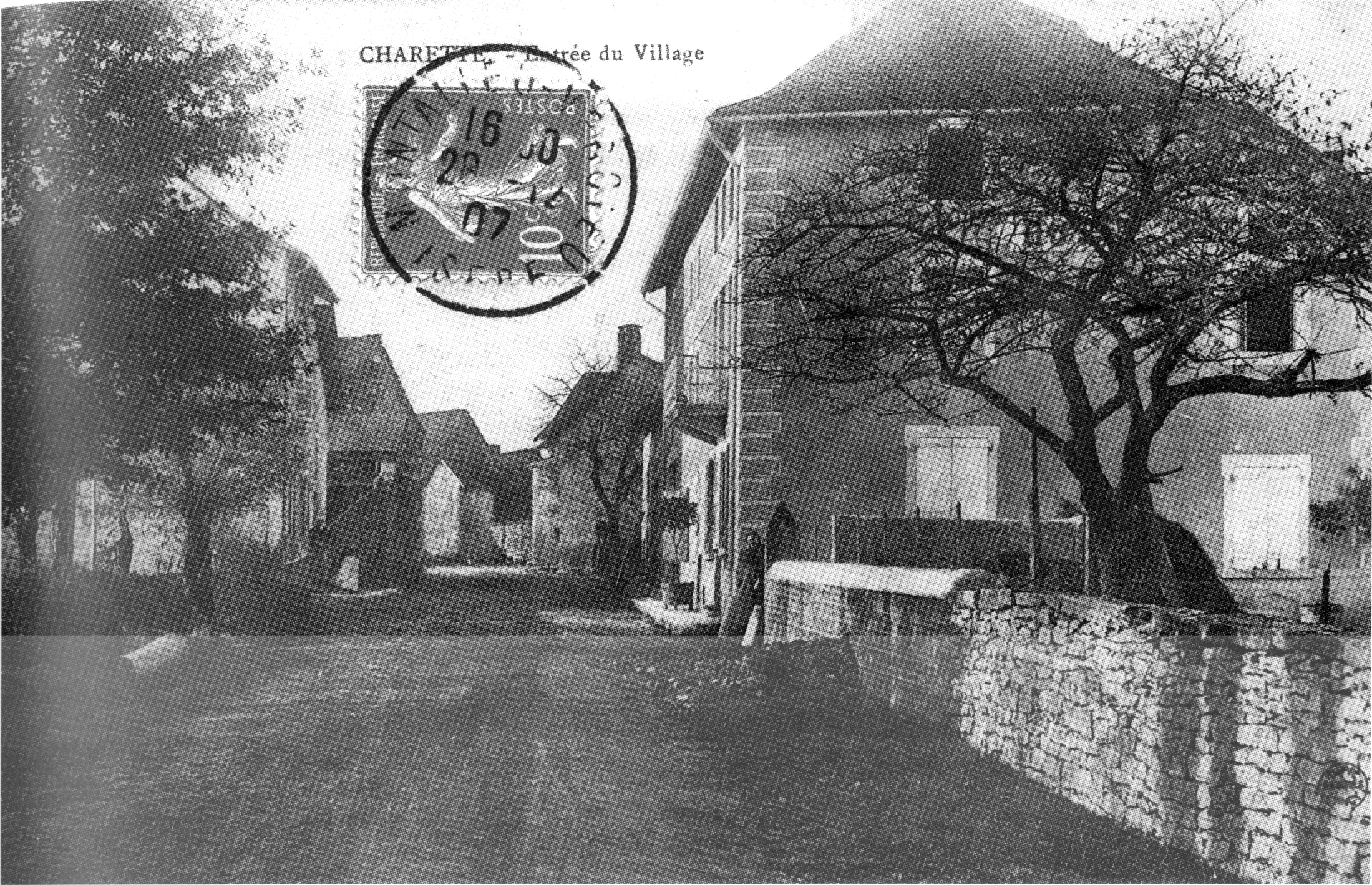
- The road into Charette in 1907
- Location of Charette
- Location within France Location within Auvergne-Rhône-Alpes
- Coordinates: 45°48′40″N 5°22′15″E
- Country: France
- Region: Auvergne-Rhône-Alpes
- Department: Isère
- Arrondissement: La Tour-du-Pin
- Canton: Morestel

Government
  - Mayor (2022–2026): Francis Maurice Surnon
- Area^{1}: 11.26 km^{2} (4.35 sq mi)
- Elevation: 248 m (814 ft)
- Highest elevation: 350 m (1,150 ft)
- Lowest elevation: 240 m (790 ft)
- Population (2023): 445
  - Density: 39.5/km^{2} (102/sq mi)
- Time zone: UTC+01:00 (CET)
  - Summer (DST): UTC+02:00 (CEST)
- INSEE/Postal code: 38083 /38390
- ^{1} French Land Register data, which excludes lakes, ponds, glaciers > 1 km^{2} (0.386 sq mi or 247 acres) and river estuaries.

Charette (French pronunciation: [ʃaʁɛt]) is a commune in the Isère department in southeastern France.

== Population ==
Historical population
Year	Pop.	±% p.a.
1968	194	—
1975	189	−0.37%
1982	197	+0.59%
1990	232	+2.07%
1999	281	+2.15%
2007	384	+3.98%
2012	469	+4.08%
2017	459	−0.43%
2023	445	−0.51%
Source: INSEE

== See also ==
- Communes of the Isère department
