= Bridges of Lyon =

This is a list of bridges in the French city of Lyon on the Rhône and Saône rivers, ordered from upstream to downstream portions of the river.

== The Rhône ==
=== Pont Raymond Poincaré (1939–1989) ===
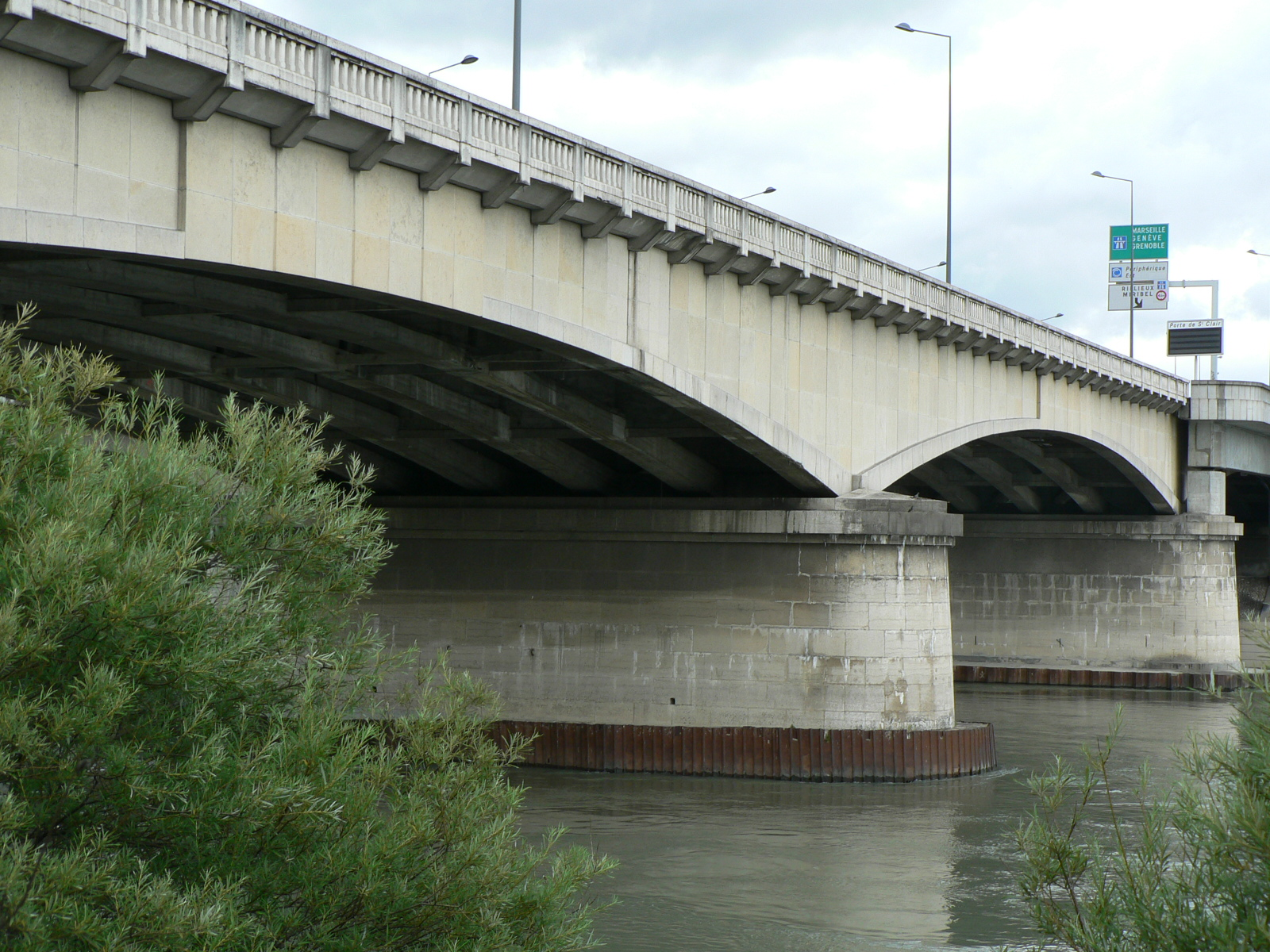
The Raymond Poincaré bridge in 2008

This bridge is considered to belong to the bridges of Lyon even though it actually is outside the city's physical limits. The right bank is located in Caluire-et-Cuire, while the left one is in Villeurbanne.

The bridge was built in conjunction with the establishment of Boulevard périphérique de Lyon initiated by President of the General Council Bonnevay Lawrence, a highway that bears his name today. The bridge itself is named after Raymond Poincaré, president of France from 1913 to 1921, and prime minister from 1926 to 1929, during the devaluation of the French franc—a point in time where the franc became known as the franc Poincaré due to its decreased value. Construction of the bridge began in 1937 as a classic concrete arch bridge, for both road and rail traffic, with four piles. While World War II slowed work, construction on the bridge continued through 1940, though an attack by German forces destroyed the bridge's roadway. Despite the setback, construction on the structure resumed shortly after the assault. Towards the end of the war, retreating German forces destroyed the bridge again by dynamiting the structural arches.

The bridge was rebuilt in 1950, but during an inspection, cracks were found in the structural concrete of the bridge and it had to be closed to traffic. After four years of repair work, the bridge reopened in 1954. Ten years later, more cracks appeared below the railroad tracks. The bridge was replaced by a temporary steel structure that remained in place until the reopening of the bridge in its current state in 1989. More recently, both ends of the bridge have been widened and modified to connect to an interchange north of the structure and to a large traffic circle at the Boulevard périphérique.

=== SNCF viaduct (1857) ===
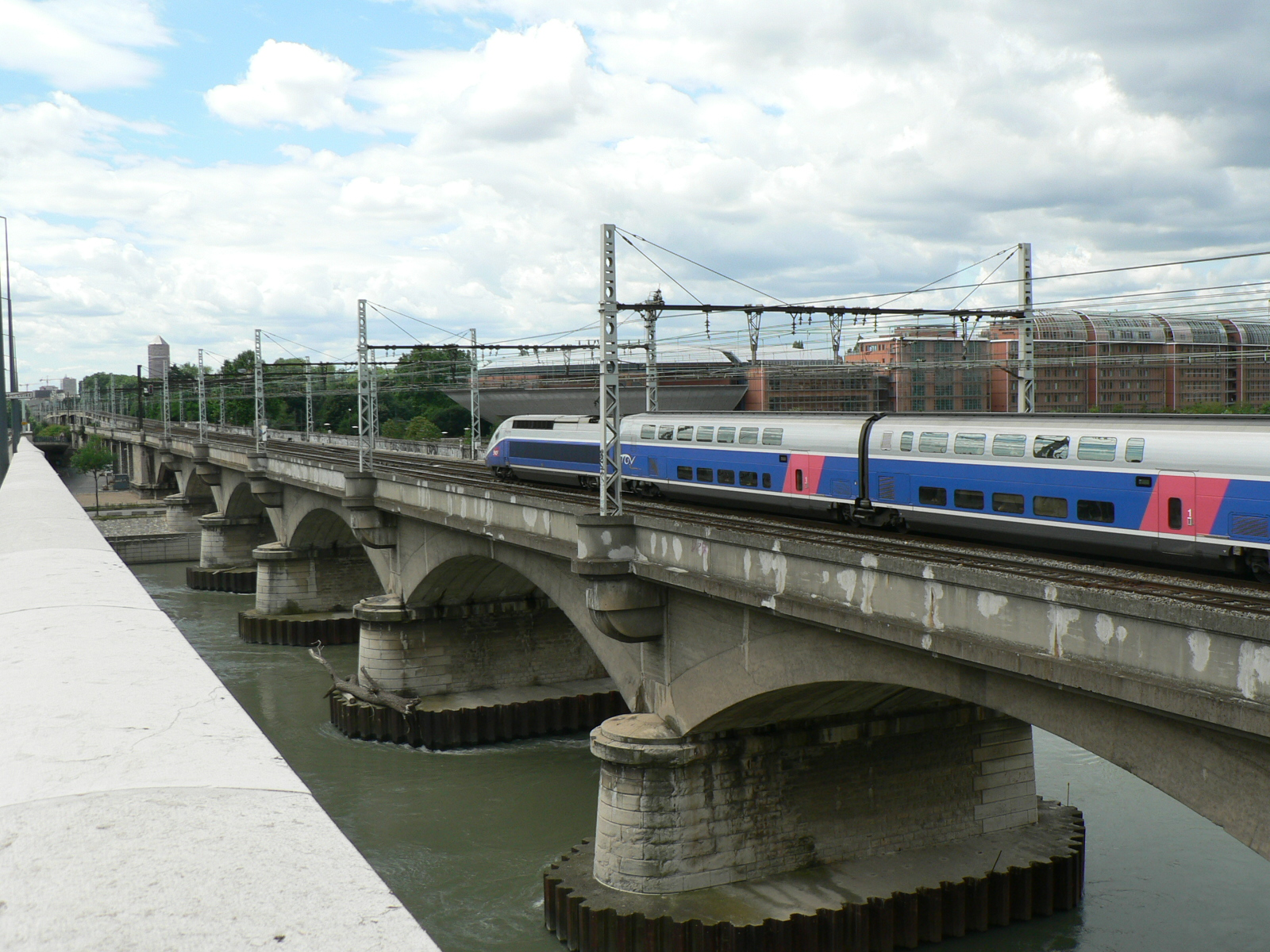
The viaduct SNCF (1857) in 2008

This cast-iron railway bridge was built from 1854 in 1857 to support the Lyon-Geneva, which merged in 1857 with the Chemins de fer de Paris à Lyon et à la Méditerranée (PLM). Today it allows passage via the Collonges tunnel to the west of France and to Paris. For a few meters it parallels the Raymond Poincaré road bridge and tunnel.

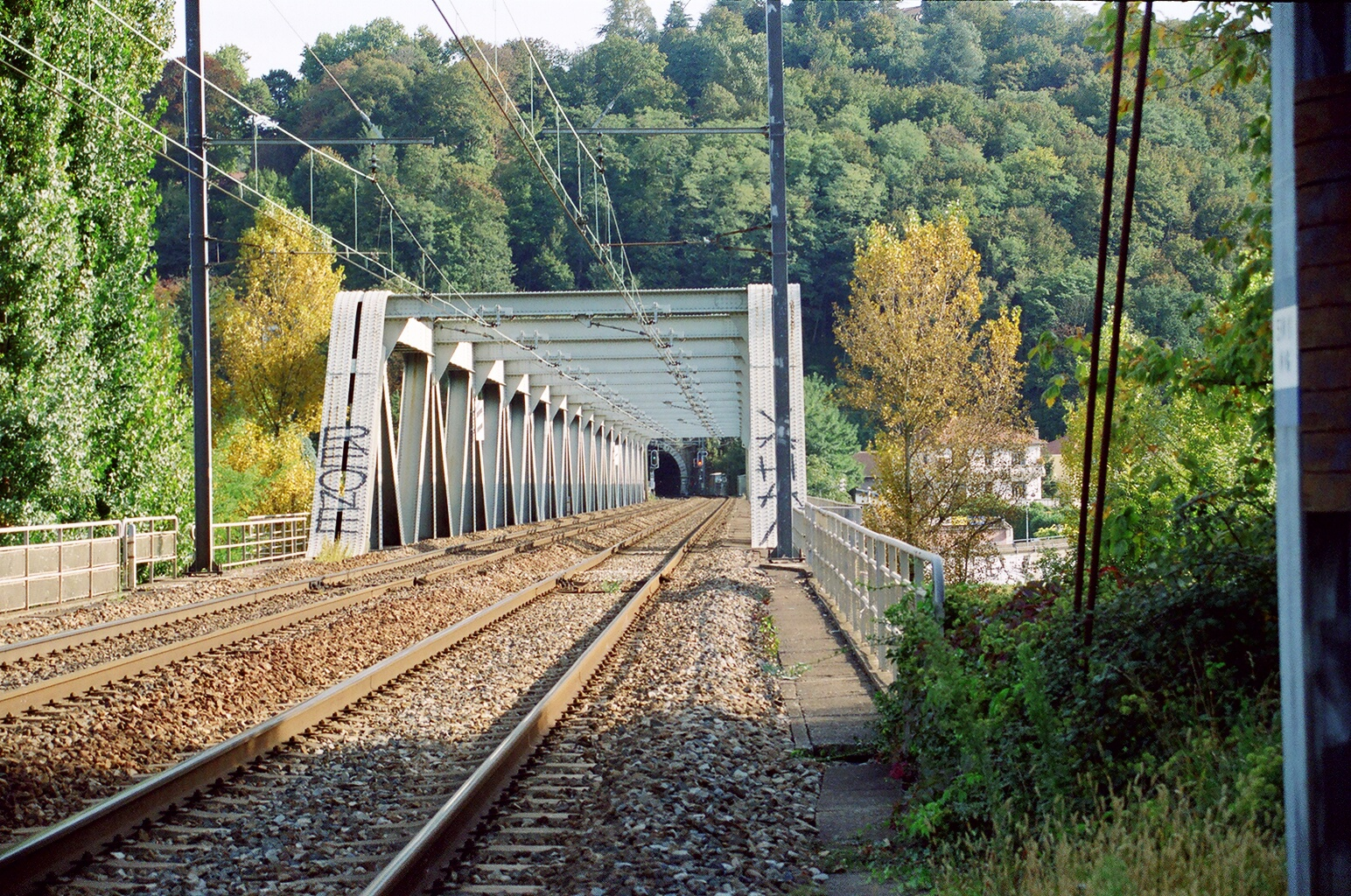
SNCF viaduct

The batteries are still based on piles driven into the Rhône and the construction of the Cité Internationale de Lyon, which narrowed the bed and increased the water level was during a complete recasting, strengthening their bases protected by massive concrete. In 1856, when the work was very advanced, they were detained on suspicion that the bridge and dam had increased the level of the flood. It required the manufacturers to replace the western edge of the dam which limited the Parc de la Tête d'Or by several spans for the passage of water. This provision is still very visible.

Damaged by the Germans in 1944, it was completely reopened to traffic in 1946.

=== Passerelle de la Paix (2014) ===
The Passerelle de la Paix (Skyway of Peace) is a 220-metre (720-foot) long pedestrian and bicycle bridge over the Rhône river. It was designed by architect Dietmar Feichtinger and opened to the public in March 2014. It connects the 6th arrondissement of Lyon and the commune of Caluire-et-Cuire.

=== Pont Winston Churchill (1982) ===
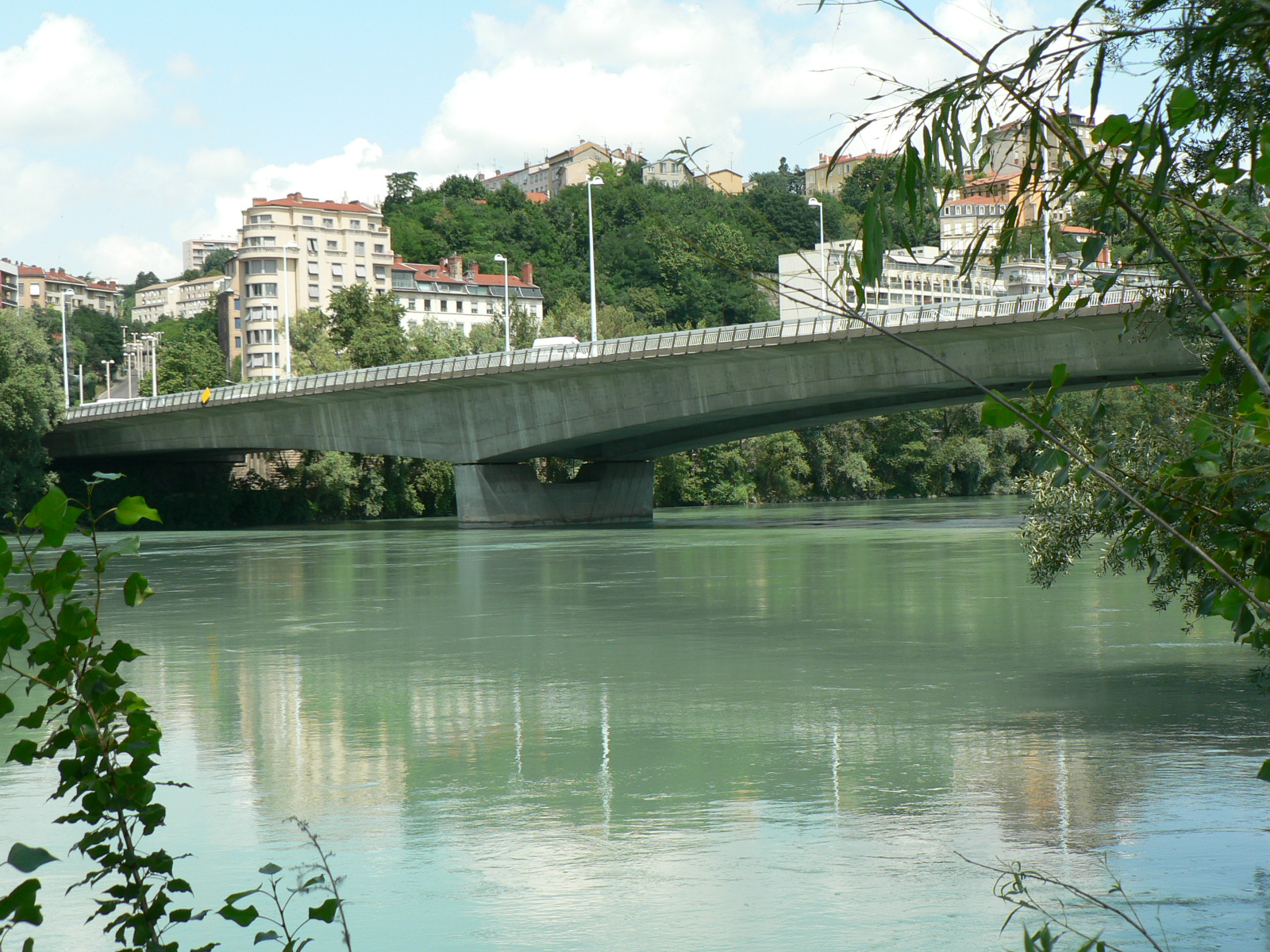

In 1862, the Marshal de Castellane was a bridge made of boats connecting the Grand Camp to Sathonay-Camp. This bridge was replaced by a metal bridge in 1874.

In 1899, also a new bridge-type metal, the bridge was considered an unusual figure in Lyon because it consisted of two major airlines' arches, resting on two intermediate replacement batteries as the Bridge Loop, due to the large curve of the Rhône against the "balmes Caluire." It was 280 meters long with a small width (10.80 m) to only 5.40 meters carriageway, flanked by two streets of 2.70 m (8 ft 10 in). This caused its narrow loss. It held a limited volume of 7.5 tonnes, which was very inadequate for the needs of traffic.

Rebuilt after the 1944 bombing, the bridge reopened in 1946 and was renamed the Winston Churchill Bridge on January 28, 1966. It was finally demolished in 1981 and replaced by the current concrete deck in 1982.

=== Pont de Lattre de Tassigny (1956) ===
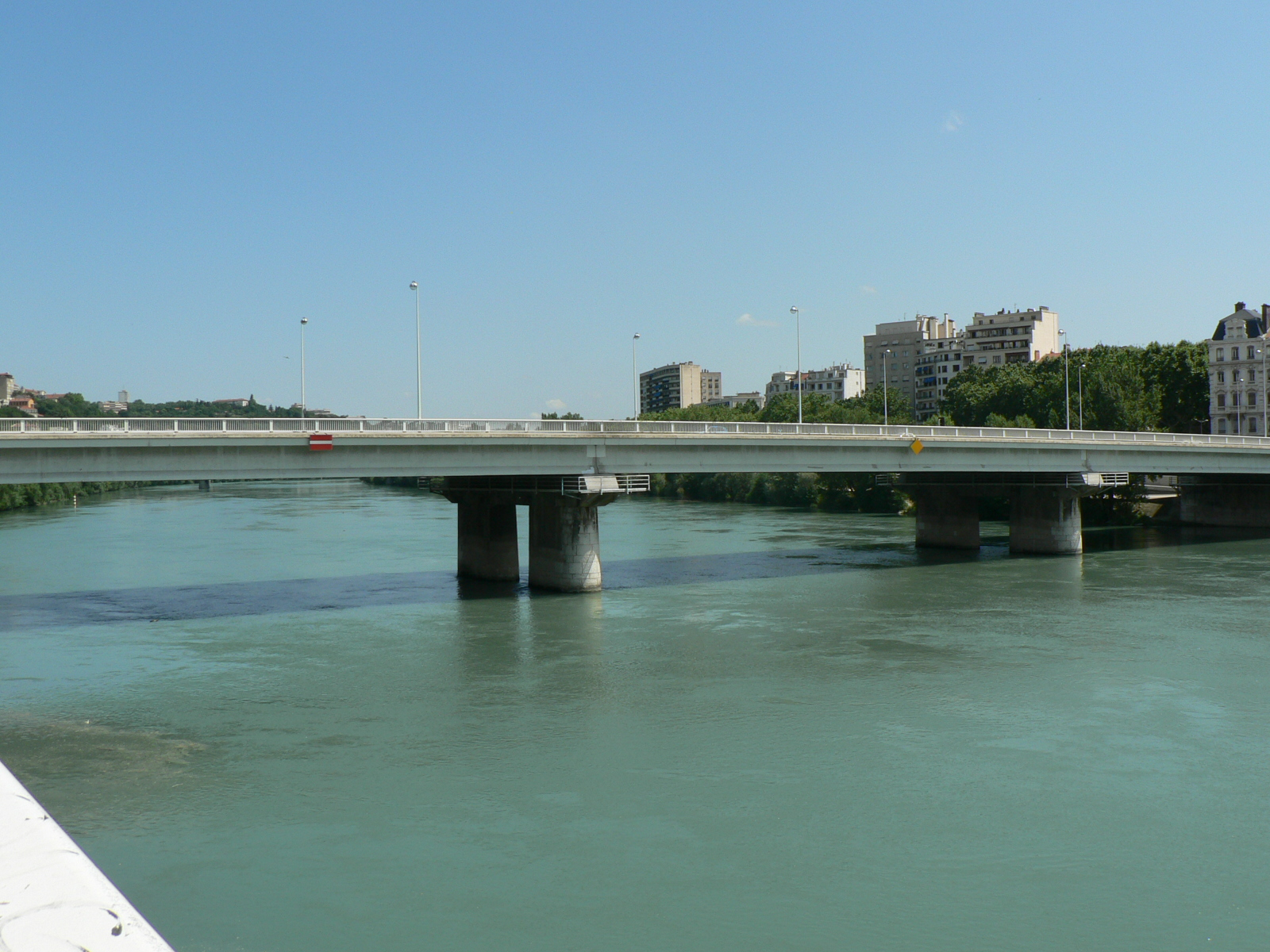
Pont de Lattre de Tassigny in 2008

The Pont de Lattre de Tassigny, also known as the Egyptian bridge, was erected on the Rhône in 1846. The name originated from the eight Egyptian columns that held up the bridge cables. It was 200 m long with a roadway of 4.80 meters surrounded by two streets of 1.10 m (3 ft 7 in). This structure, renamed the bridge to Louis-Philippe 1849, was carried off by a mill during a flood in 1854.

The bridge reopened to the public on March 30, 1856. Built in a more sober style, it was also slightly narrower (4.90 m roadway and two sidewalks of 90 cm). Called Pont St. Clair (as in 1875), it was renamed Pont Vaïsse on December 21, 1931 in tribute to Claude-Marius Vaïsse.

In 1952, digging for the tunnel de la Croix-Rousse was completed, then the Pont Vaïsse was demolished in 1953 and reconstructed in 1956 a little further down in alignment with the tunnel a new bridge named in honour of Jean de Lattre de Tassigny. The concrete bridge was 150 meters long and 25 meters wide (with a 20-meter carriageway and pavements of 2.50 meters).

=== Pont Morand (1976) ===
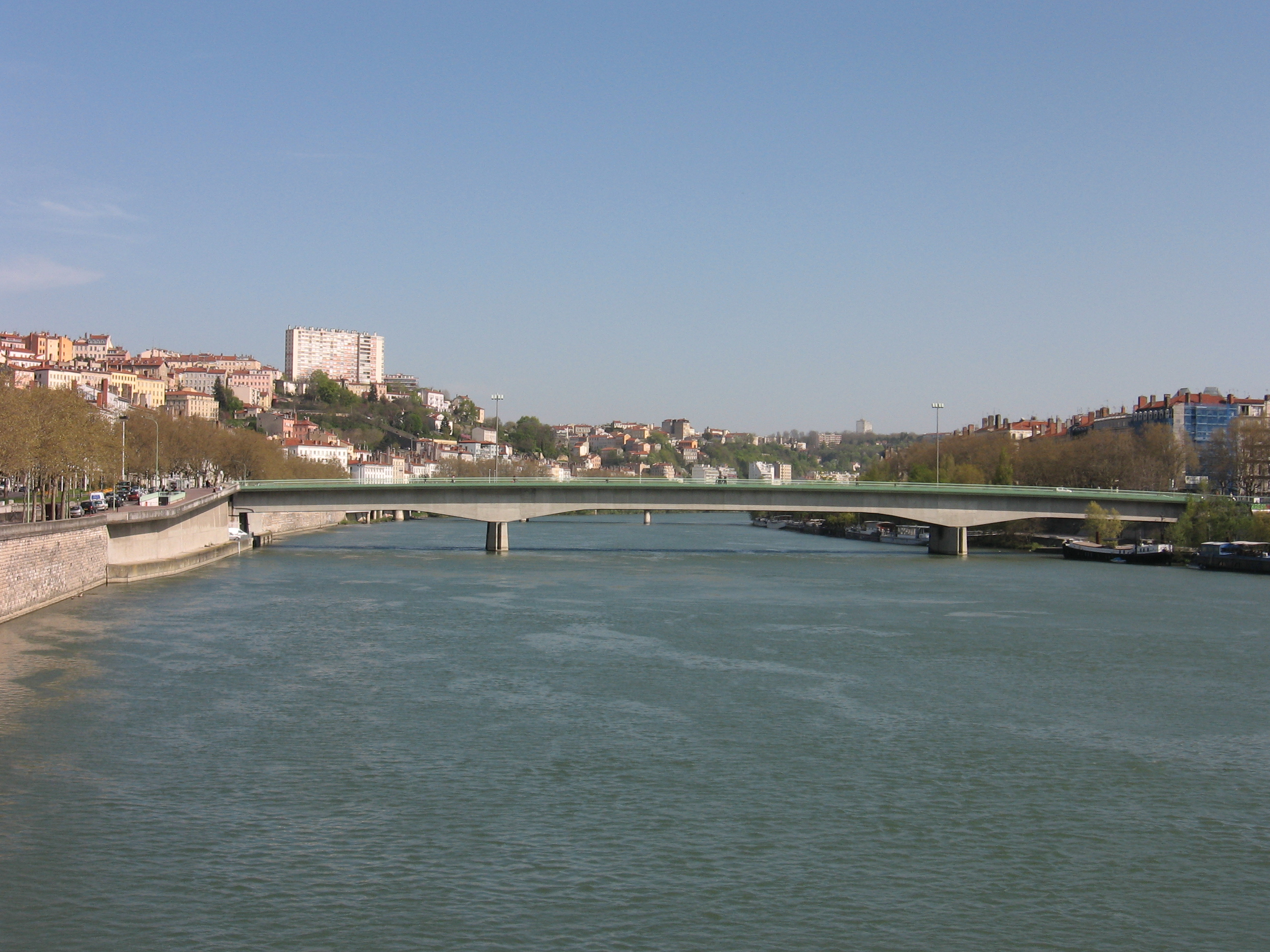
Pont Morand (2009)

Originally built in wood by the architect planner Jean-Antoine Morand in 1774, this bridge is the second oldest bridge over the Rhône. It is 208 meters long and 12 meters wide. It had several names: Pont Saint-Clair bridge or Red Wood, originally Affranchi bridge, in 1793, deck wins in 1794, then Morand bridge in 1810. In 1825, the bridge collapsed and was replaced by a flying bridge during its reconstruction. In 1854, to resist floods, the bridge carried St. Clair strikes the bridge piers of Morand blocked the flow of water.

But in the 1880s, the dilapidated bridge threatened to collapse and had to be restricted from traffic. In 1890, it was replaced by a metal bridge structure based on piles of masonry. It was 214.50 meters long, with a surface of 11 meters and two sidewalks of 4.50 m (15 ft). The central arch was destroyed by the Germans in 1944. On 3 February 1945, a temporary wooden bridge, the bridge building, was opened to allow traffic for the reconstruction of the Pont Morand. It consisted of a deck of 205 meters based on ten cells on stilts. The final bridge was reopened on April 3, 1948.

It was demolished in 1974 in connection with the subway. In 1976, the current concrete bridge along 187 m was inaugurated. It allowed the metro to move within the apron, while cars and pedestrians are on the surface on a surface of 15.50 m wide and two sidewalks of 2 m . Originally designed as the first of two twin bridges, it aligns with the draft of the breakthrough Martinière-Morand, unlike the previous bridge, which was in line with the current Franklin-Roosevelt (former course Morand). This project has been abandoned; the second Pont Morand was never built.

=== Passerelle du Collège (1844) ===
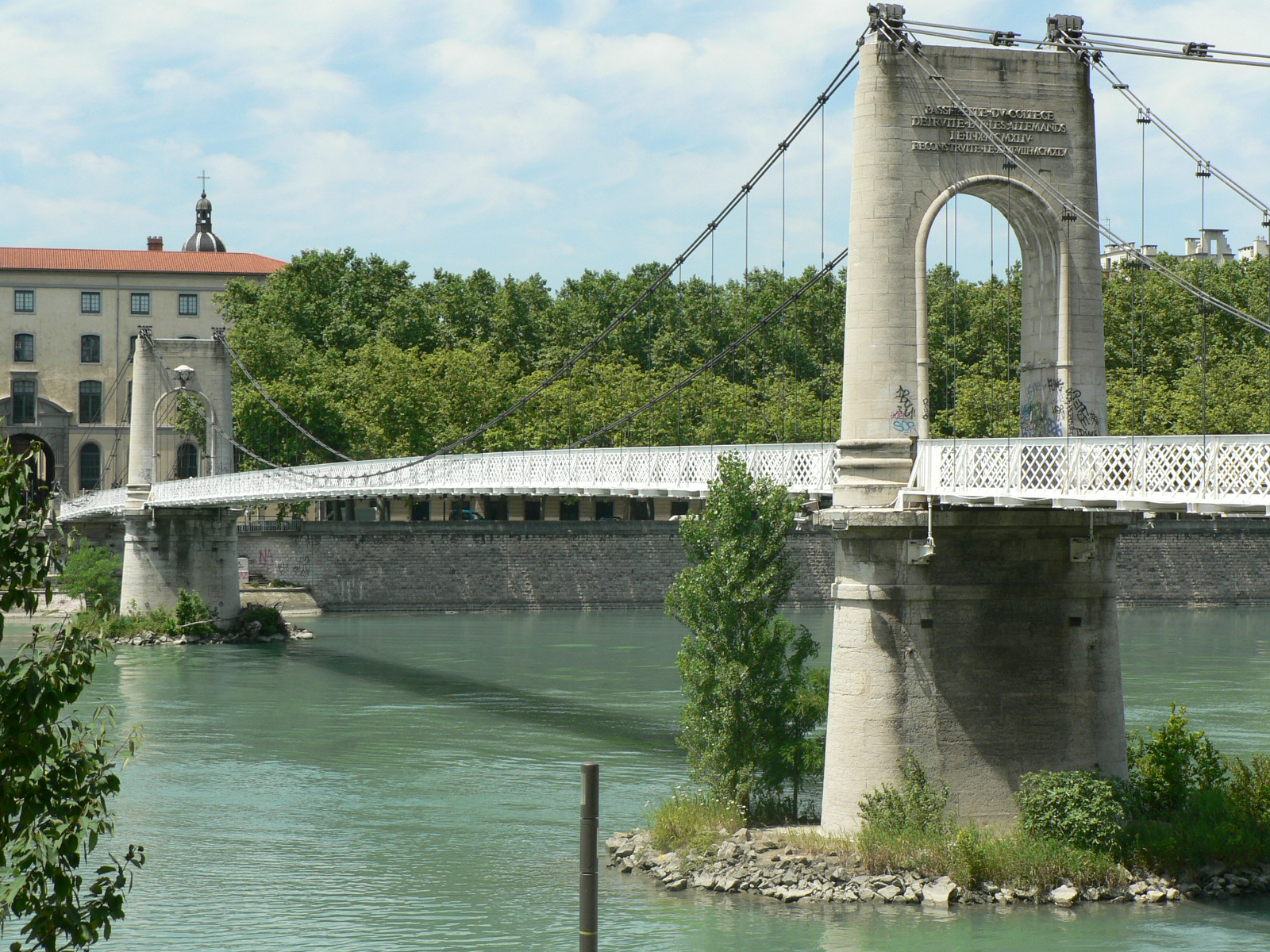
Passerelle du Collège

This bridge takes its name from the Collège-lycée Ampère because it leads on the right bank to Passage Ménétrier, included in the college of the same name, formerly called the Great College under the Old Regime, the Small College is the square of the same name in the old-town, Vieux Lyon.

It was built due to the pressure of population on the left bank, which had no public high school (the girls did not appear at the end of 19th century and the Parc after the war 1914), the bridge allowed the students not to take detour bridges Morand or Lafayette and cross safely.

The group of bridges on the Rhône were created in 1842 and was required to achieve and a project is approved as early as July. The bridge, of "iron wire", was always based on three rock piles which were renewed from time to time, and had three spans of 96 m at the center and 42.5 m on the sides with a width of 4 m (13 ft).

The construction was marked by a tragic incident. Work was nearing completion on 7 December 1844 when a bolt holding a cable in its sheath broke. The bridge collapsed and eight workers drowned. Work restarted immediately and the bridge opened for traffic on September 3, 1845.

The bridge was partially destroyed in 1944, a battery was rebuilt almost identical in stones (the middle one bears a commemorative inscription). The bridge finally opened to the public on September 3, 1945, since the passage of pedestrians quai Jean-Moulin au quai Général-Sarrail is busy.

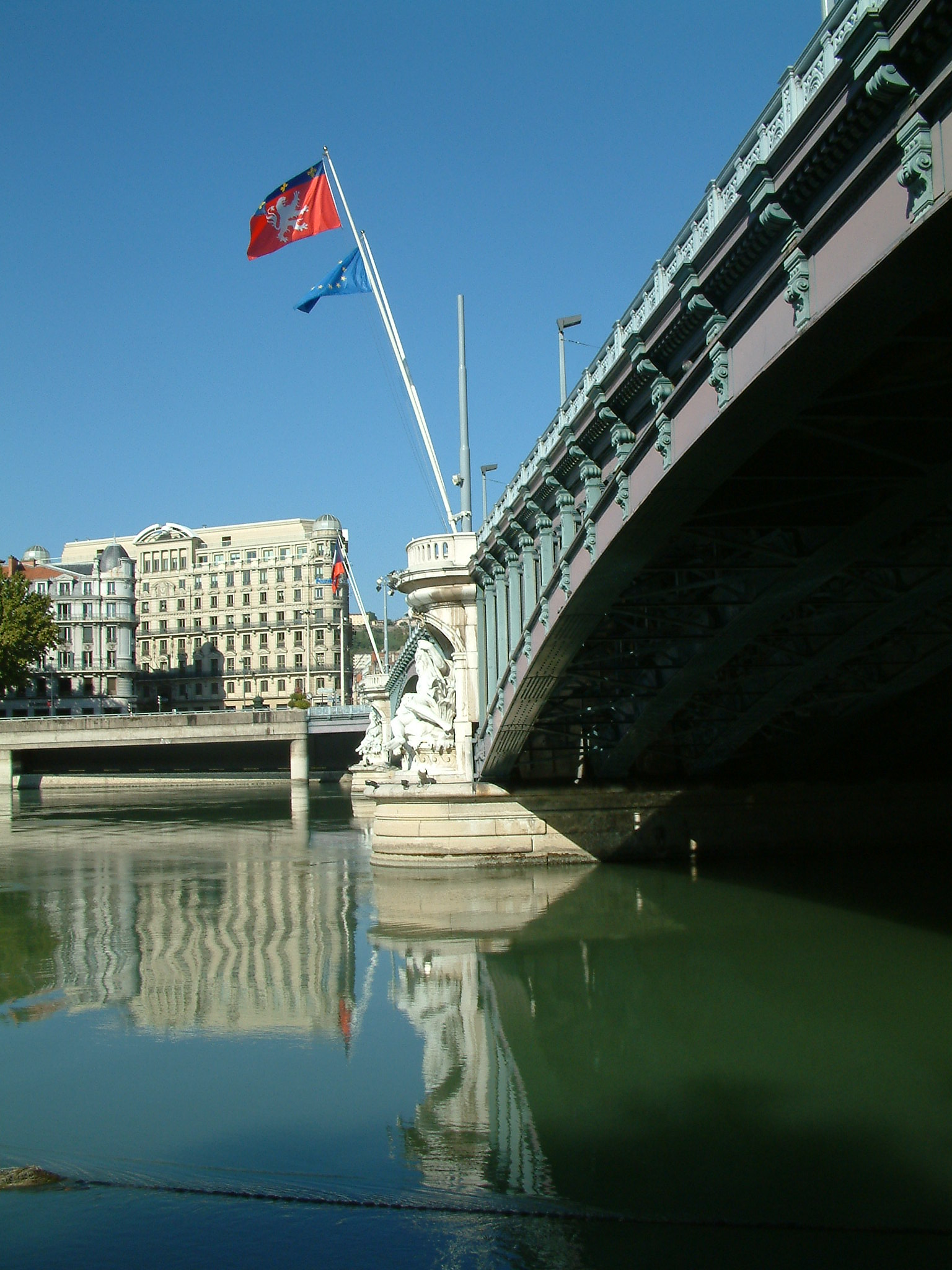
Pont Lafayette from the left bank

=== Pont Lafayette (1890) ===
This is the third-oldest bridge on the Rhône. In 1826, is first constructed a bridge, the Pont Charles X or Bridge Concert from 1828. 214 m long and 13 m wide, it consisted of timber resting on abutments and masonry piers.

On 5 September 1829 the Marquis de La Fayette made a triumphal entry into Lyon via the bridge, which was renamed in his honour on 19 September 1830. It was washed away by floods in 1840, then again in 1856.

Too old, it was replaced in 1890 by the current bridge, with a steel structure resting on piers of Porcieu-Amblagnieu stone. The central arch was destroyed in September 1944. The bridge was rebuilt and reopened in 1946.

=== Pont Wilson (1918) ===
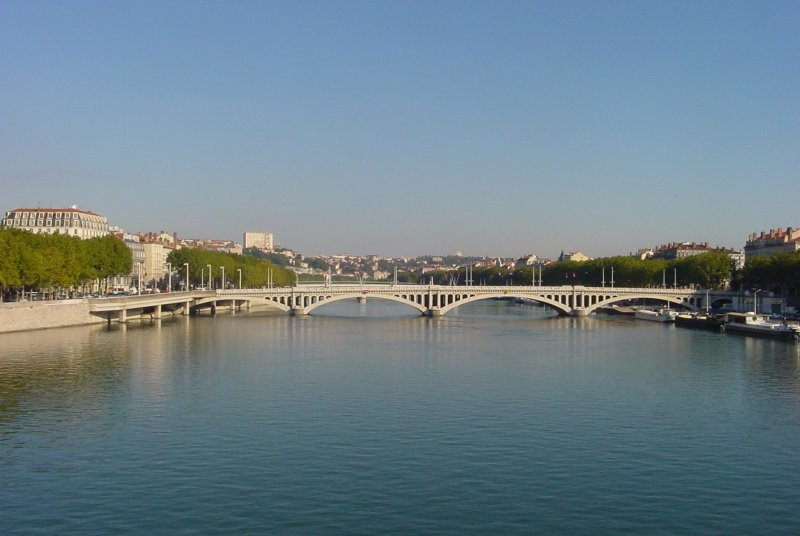
Pont Wilson

The first bridge, the bridge of the Hôtel-Dieu also known as bridge of the Hôpital, was built in 1837–1839 by the contractor Clauzel, on behalf of the Companie des ponts du Rhône. It was a suspension bridge with a length of 210 m (689 ft), based on solid concrete piers, protected by riprap.

In 1887, the condition of the bridge was considered dangerous and it was finally demolished in 1912. It was replaced by a temporary wooden bridge, then by the Woodrow Wilson Bridge, inaugurated on 14 July 1918. The new bridge was much wider than the former (20 m against 7), and the sidewalks increased from 1.10 m to 4.50 m (15 ft). A revolutionary structure for the period, it had a reinforced concrete deck resting on piers of stone masonry in the Villette. The bridge was damaged in September 1944 and reopened in 1948.

=== Bridge of the Guillotière (1953) ===
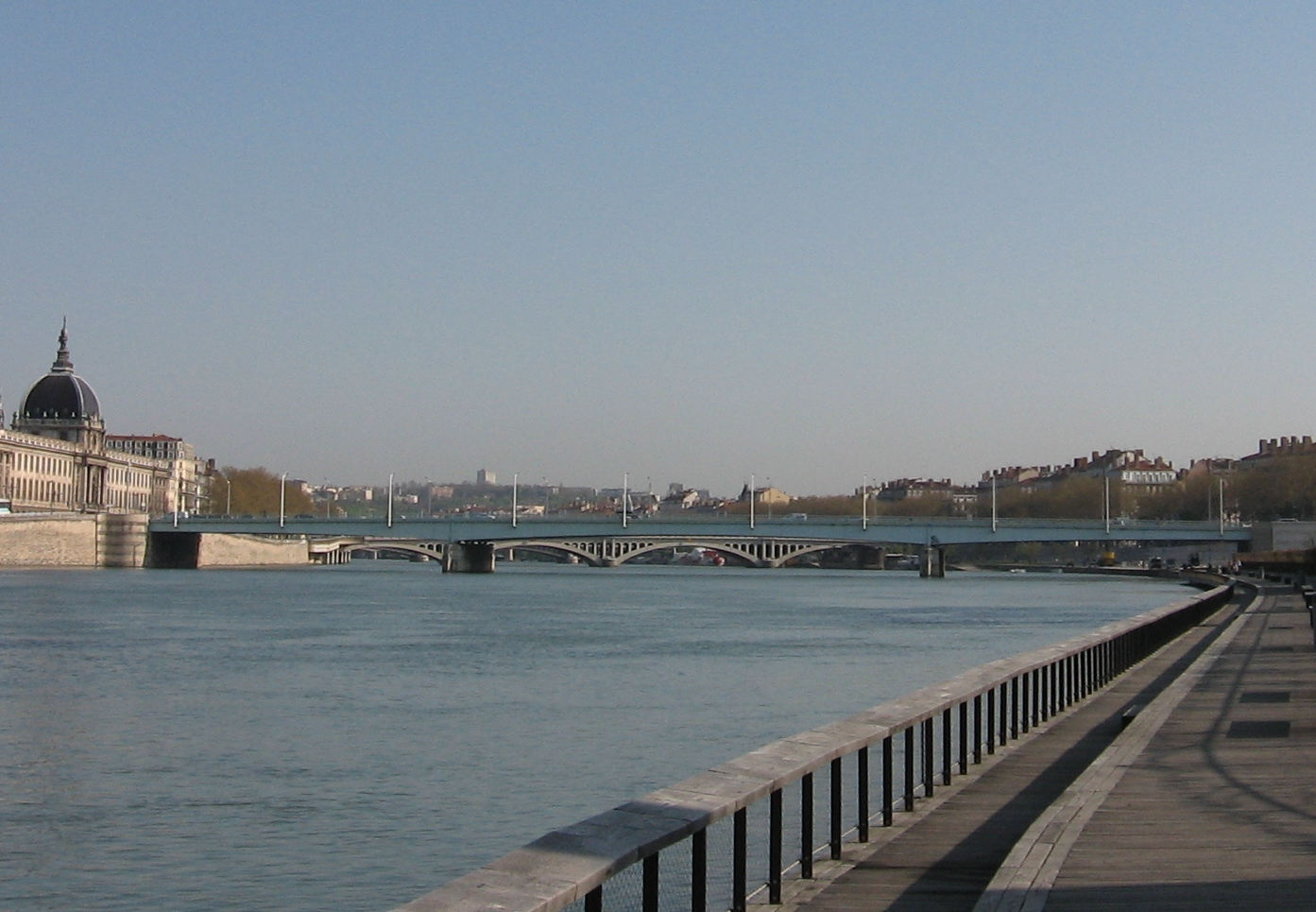
La Guillotière Bridge, 2009

The bridge of La Guillotière, also formerly known as the Rhône Bridge, is the oldest bridge over the Rhone. The bridge from the Middle Ages was based on a forest of oak piles, which have made the digging of the subway tunnel, in the 1980s. Some arches were filled on the left bank in the 1820s. This explains the anomaly which Lyon is known as Place du Pont (now Place Gabriel Péri) a place that is a hundred metres from the top deck. In 1859, the largest Gallo-Roman statue of Neptune in France was discovered along the left bank close to the Hôtel-Dieu de Lyon. The bridge was destroyed during the retreat of the German army in September 1944. It was demolished in 1952 and replaced by a wider bridge with a metallic structure in 1953.

=== University Bridge (1903) ===
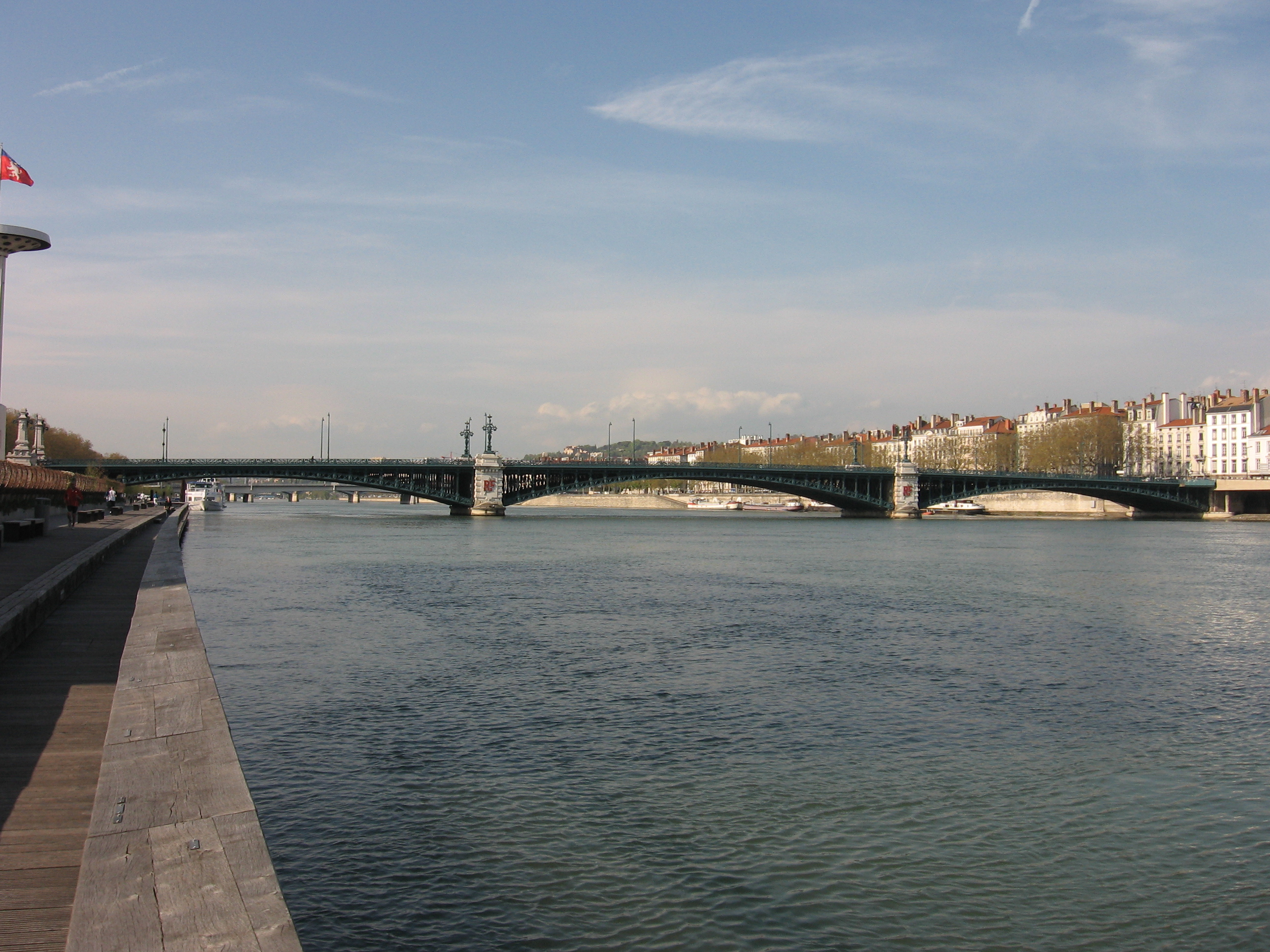
Pont de l'Université, 2009

This bridge was built at the site of an old ferry to serve the university buildings erected between 1876 and 1898. When it opened in 1903, the bridge was named bridge of the Faculties, but it was quickly renamed the University Bridge. When it was damaged in 1944, a temporary wooden bridge was established. The bridge was finally reopened in 1947. The bridge, along 267.50 m to 20 m wide, consists of three arches in Longwy molten metal and resting on piers built of Porcieu-Amblagnieu stone.

=== Pont Gallieni (1965) ===
A project, outlined in 1830, envisaged the construction of an east-west axis, consisting of either side of the current course of Verdun of a bridge over the Saône (now Kitchener-Marchand bridge) and two bridges over the Rhône. These crossings are appointed every two bridge Seguin, was completed in 1847 and open to the public in 1849.

The new bridge over the Rhône is composed of two shares constructed and others Bechevelin Island. The main bridge over the Rhône is composed of two piers supporting a central span of 60 m long and 7.4 m wide by two side spans respectively 39 and 67 m (220 ft). He took the name of Napoleon bridge, then bridge Séguin (1849), Rhône bridge (1852) and the Midi bridge to 1871. That same year, the Lône Bechevelin is filled.

The main deck in a very poor state was destroyed in June 1889. It was rebuilt between 1889 and 1891. As Morand and Lafayette bridge built at the same time, this new bridge has three arches of metal. It is 20 m wide and 209 m (686 ft). long. It was inaugurated on 13 July 1891 under the name of Midi Bridge, but it was renamed Gallieni July 17, 1916. It was destroyed in 1944, rebuilt, and finally demolished in 1962–1965 to be replaced by a steel bridge larger (28.5 m) but shorter (204, 8 m), inaugurated on 30 October 1965. Since 2001, the number of lanes to traffic has been reduced to bring the two lines of tram T1-T2.

=== Perrache Viaduct (1856) ===
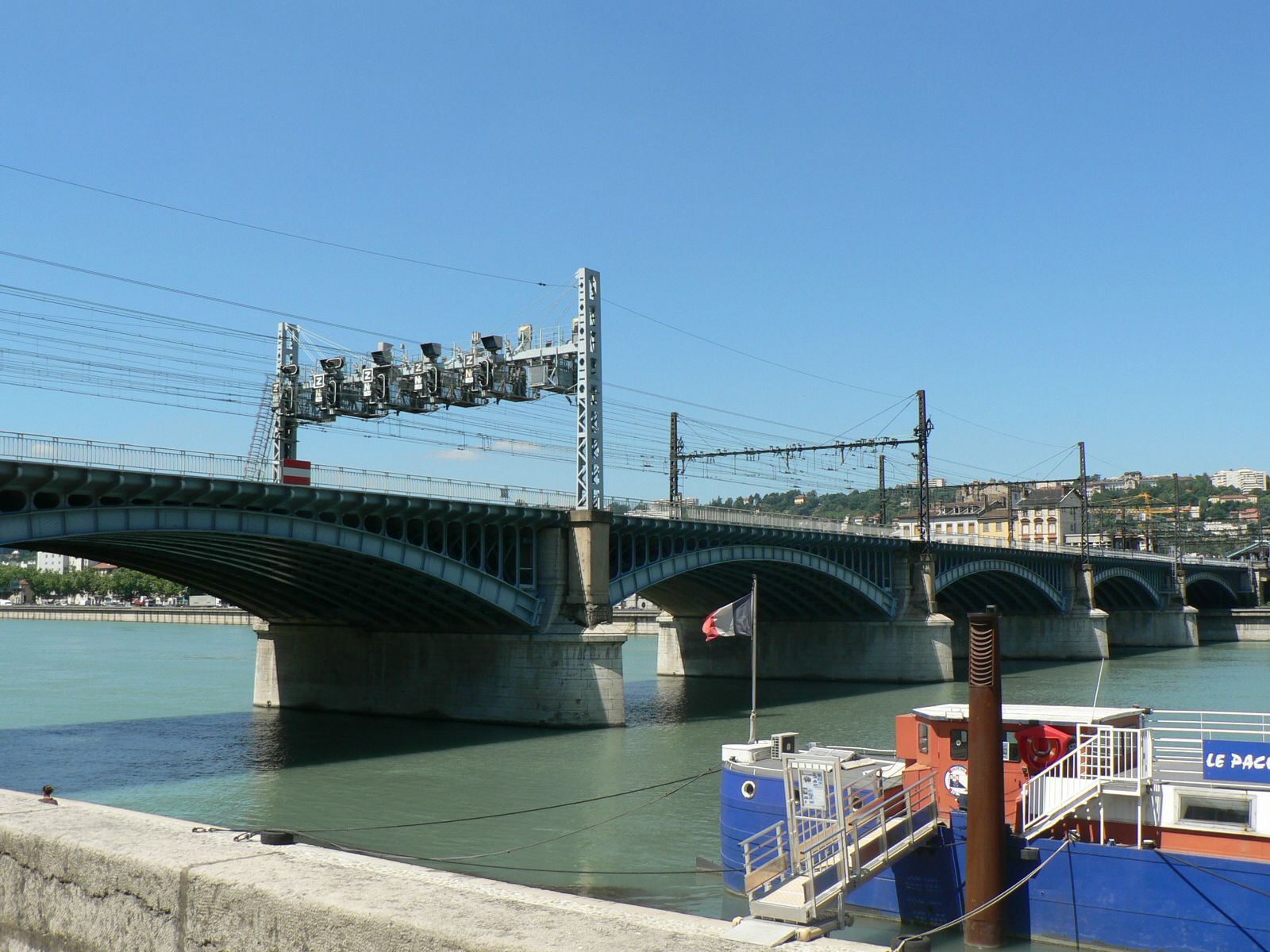
Viaduct Perrache in 2008

This railway bridge was built between 1852 and 1856 to link the Gare de Lyon-Perrache and the Gare des Brotteaux. It is also referred to as the bridge of the Mediterranean 'because it is part of the artery "imperial" of Chemins de fer de Paris à Lyon et à la Méditerranée (PLM).

It was first built on two channels at the same time as the tunnel is drilled Saint Irenaeus to link the Perrache train station in station Vaise, and beyond to Paris-Gare de Lyon.

Its cast iron arches made Givors are based on batteries sitting on piles under the old techniques, but renewed and strengthened several times, especially when doubling its steel in 1926. It was only slightly damaged in 1944, first on 26 May by an Allied bomb, then by German artificers.

In the early days of the Liberation, the Americans filled in tracks remaining in place to move convoys heavy vehicles onto the deck with ramps installed at the station in Perrache.

=== Pont des Girondins (in development) ===
A proposed new crossing of the Rhône is envisaged under the Lyon Confluence project. It would link Perrache and Gerland up to the rue des Girondins. The main obstacle to the construction of this structure is the presence of the A7 on the banks of the Rhône at Perrache.

=== Pont Pasteur (1949) ===
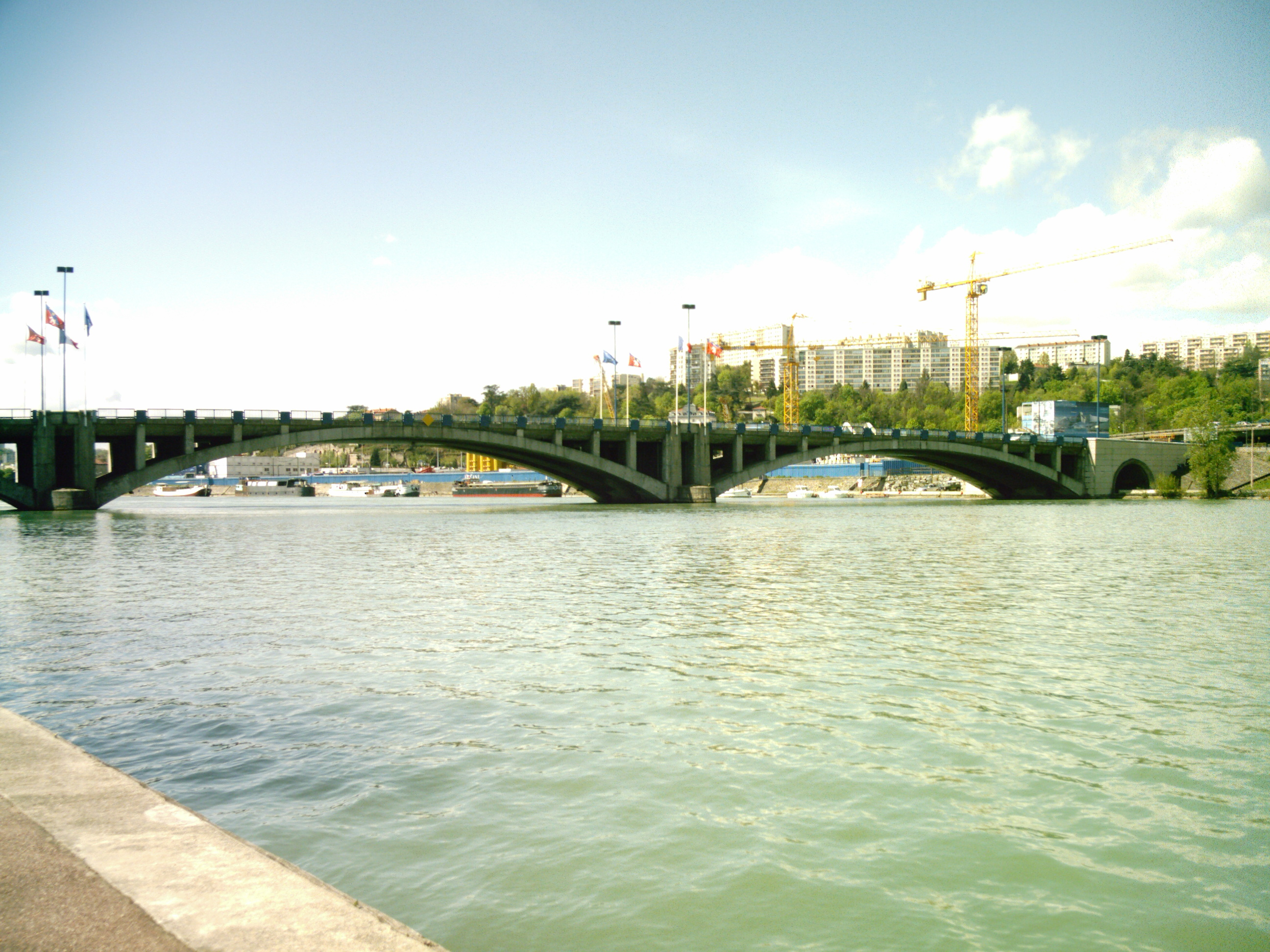
The Pasteur bridge

A first provisional structure, the bridge of the Exposition, was built for the Universal Exhibition in Gerland in 1914.

This gateway then took the name of the Halle Tony-Garnier bridge. It was carried away by a flood in October 1918. A new bridge with three arches, built entirely of reinforced concrete, was erected to replace it. It was baptized the Louis Pasteur Bridge by the City Council at its meeting of 5 March 1923 and inaugurated on 14 July 1923.

At 225 m long, it has very wide sidewalks (5.25 m for a road of 11 m). The bridge was severely damaged by the Germans in 1944. The current bridge was built to replace it. Inaugurated in 1950, this bridge is not as long (195.25 m) but larger (more than 18 m), however the streets were narrowed to 3.32 m (11 ft).

=== Raymond Barre Bridge (2013) ===
In view of the prolongation of the tramway line T1 in 2014, the bridge named after Raymond Barre (Pont Raymond-Barre), designed by architect Alain Spielmann) was built in 2007-2013 next to the Pasteur bridge.

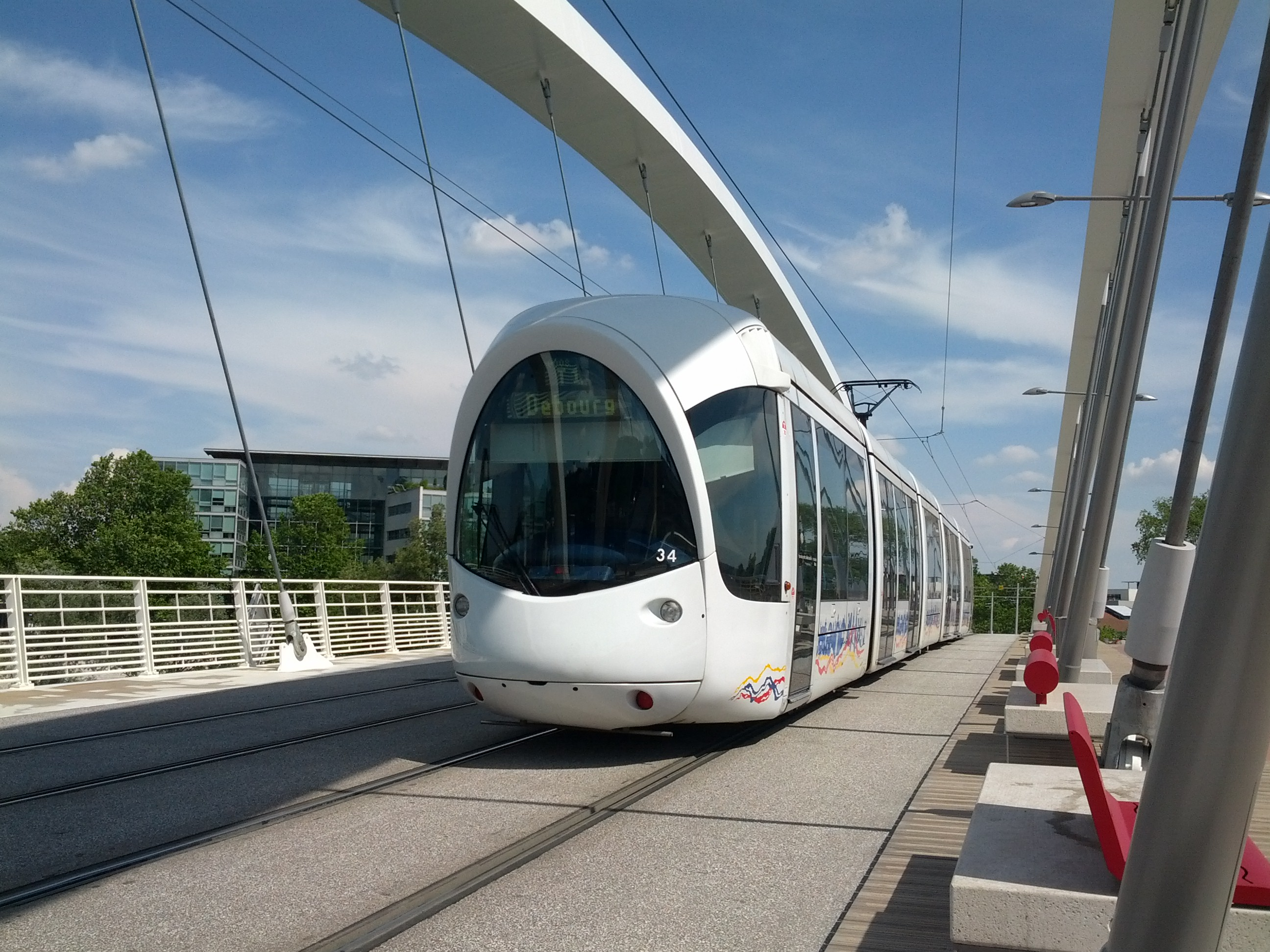
The bridge Raymond-Barre

== On the Saône ==
=== Île Barbe (1827) ===
The suspension bridge built on both sides of the tip of Île Barbe was originally built in 1827 by Marc Seguin, himself a Lyon resident, born in the Ainay district of Lyon, on the site of an old bridge formerly known as the Pont Cotton (attested in the 17th century).

It is the oldest surviving bridge structure in Lyon; its construction was followed by that of the Pont de Couzon (1840) and the Passerelle Saint-Georges footbridge (1853; later renamed Passerelle Paul Couturier), the pillars of which are shaped like silk weavers' shuttles.

=== Pont Schuman ===
A new crossing of the Saône was completed in 2014 to connect the Vaise neighbourhood in the 9th arrondissement to Serin in the 4th arrondissement. This new bridge, named after Robert Schuman, was built upstream of the Pont Masaryk, which is restricted to pedestrian and cyclist use only. The Pont Schuman was built as an extension of the Rue de la Gare d'Eau. It opened to traffic on 5 November 2014 to the accompaniment of a sound and light show.

=== Passerelle Masaryk (1831) ===
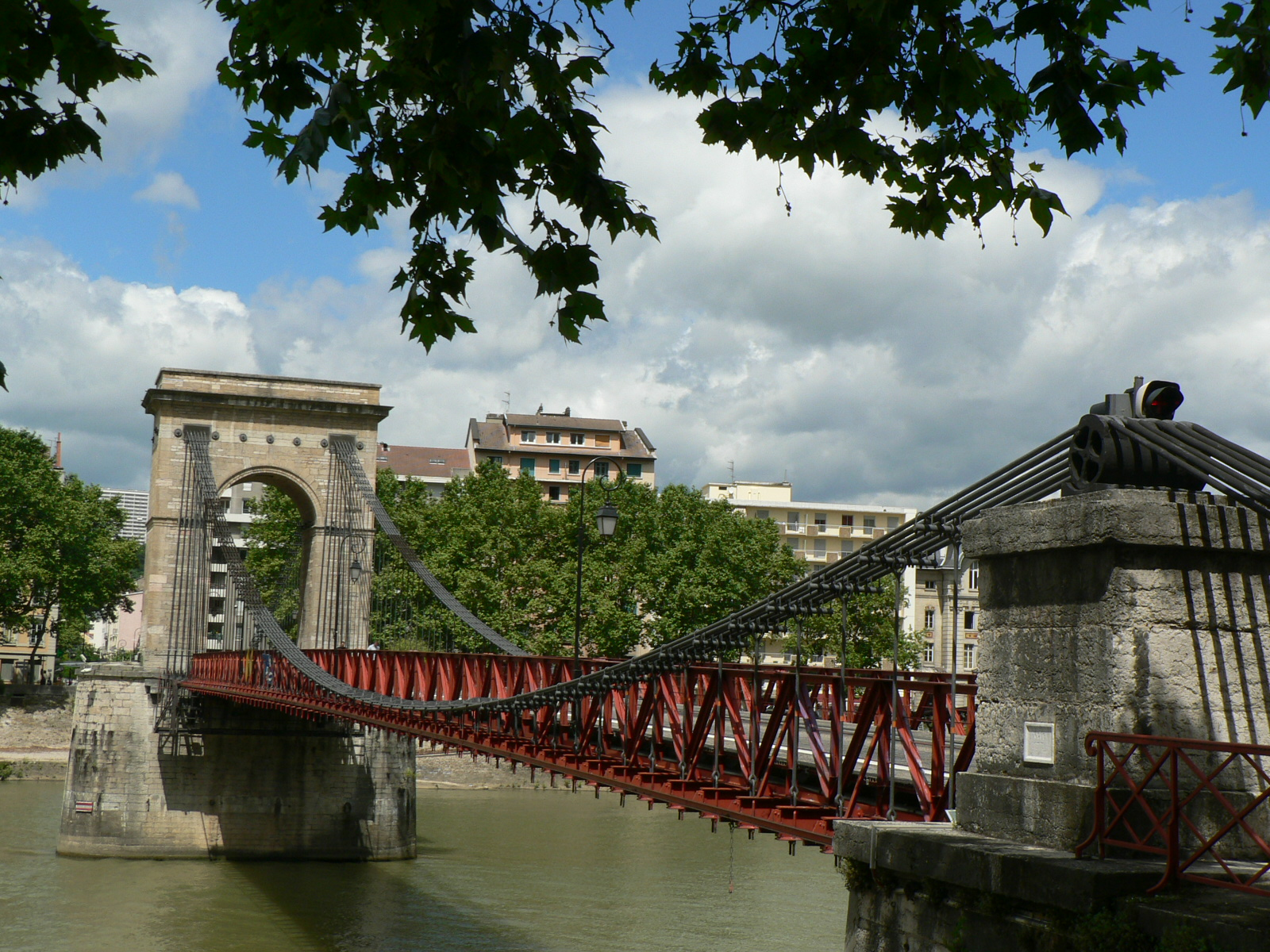
Passerelle Masaryk

This suspension bridge, funded by residents, opened to the public May 17, 1831. It consisted of two spans retained by guy wires attached to three piles of Couzon stone, openness equal 85.20 m (280 ft); cables, repeatedly renewed, support apron 6.50 m wide, two sidewalks of one metre. Limited to 2.5 tonnes, it supports without problem sometimes one, sometimes two lanes of traffic, according to the necessities of the traffic sector.

It was originally the Pont Vaise (as in 1838) or bridge station Vaise (as in 1842) with reference to the harbor in use in this district of 1830 in 1974. Its current name was given by 1 January 1931 in honour of Tomáš Masaryk (1854–1937), founder of the Czechoslovak Republic and friend of Édouard Herriot.

Almost identical in construction to the bridge to the Ile-Barbe, it was, in fact, built shortly afterwards with the same construction technique. Its usefulness was related to the presence a little upstream right bank of the water station set up in 1827 for the needs of inland navigation and that can not be replaced until 1966 by the cuttings of tunnel Fourviere.

The central pier had some foundation problems because it was based on piles of wood protected by rocks that periodically had to be strengthened, but it has stood since all raw and even German artificers in 1944.

Its elegant silhouette has not changed since the original appearance and is the oldest of all the bridge piers of the city, it is also part of the heritage of this quarter of the city which marks the entrance to the urban heart of Lyon.

=== Clemenceau Bridge (1952) ===
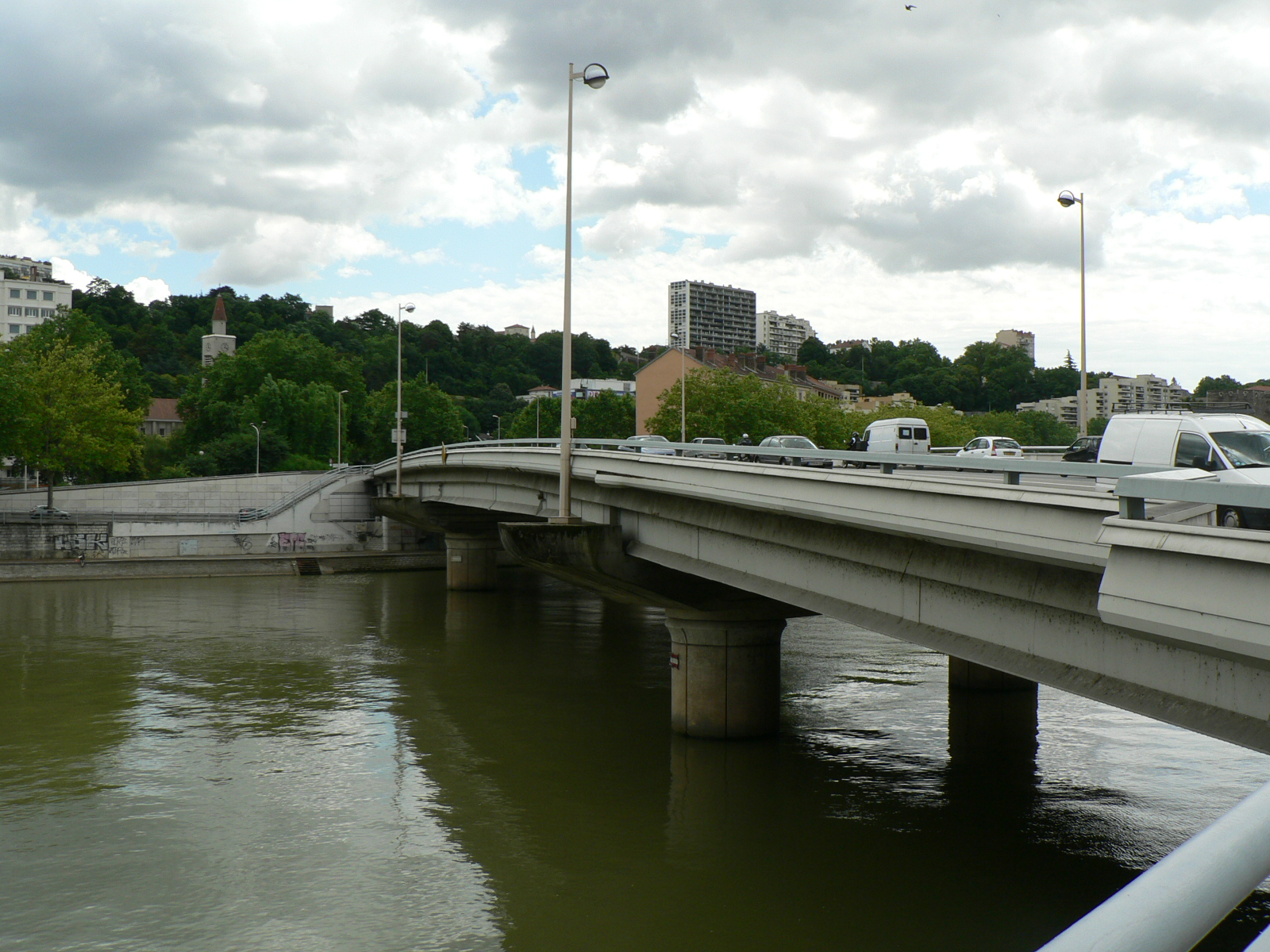
Clemenceau Bridge

In 1847, a first bridge, the bridge Mouton, was built on the Saône between Vaise and Serin. Damaged by bombing in 1944, it was rebuilt after the war. Vaïsse the bridge, it was destroyed in 1952 and replaced by a new bridge built in the alignment of the tunnel de la Croix-Rousse, the current bridge Clemenceau, named for the architect of the victory of 1918, chief negotiator of French Treaty of Versailles.

Built in steel, flat, it consists of three unequal spans (64.25 m in the centre, 39.80 m (131 ft), right bank, left bank 35.25 m (116 ft).) and its width is 25 metres, including 18 for the road . Bunkers were built on both sides, which was a first in Lyon.

This bridge was to remain a major traffic by extending urban elevated highway at the first floor of the street Marietton, a famous LY envisaged in 1950 but they were quickly abandoned .

Since the completion of peripheral North, it was reduced to two lanes passing car on the street Marietton). This project helps us understand the shape and rather unsightly piles that extend outside of the road because they had to accommodate the foundations of the bridge above.

=== Pont du Général Kœnig (1971) ===
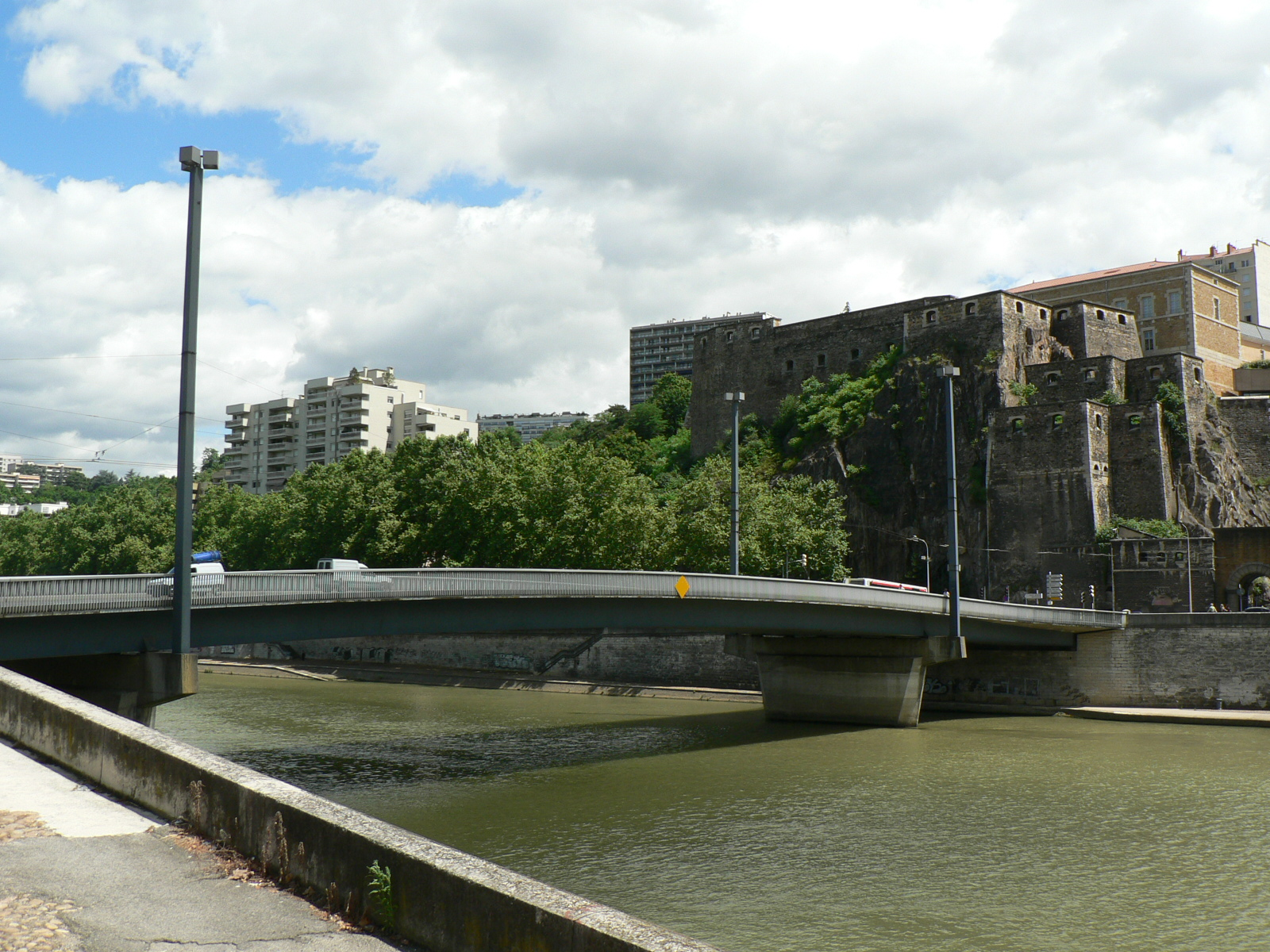
Kœnig Bridge and a view of Fort St. John, 2008

A first bridge, the Serin bridge or Halincourt bridge (as in 1789) is built by Degerando between 1745 and 1749, on behalf of Hospices Civils de Lyon, owner of the work. The bridge collapsed in 1780 and was replaced by a wooden bridge, composed of seven arches, in turn carried away by a flood of the Saône on 17 January 1789. It was replaced by a new wooden bridge just over nine meters wide consisting of five arches, built from 1811 under the direction of the engineer Kermengan and inaugurated on July 2, 1815. In 1844, the wooden hangers, old, were replaced by stone arches. Very little damaged by the Germans, it quickly reopened after the war.

Incompatible with the requirements of river traffic in view of the layout of the axis Rhin-Rhône, the then-called Pont de Serin, with two 3 m (10 ft) lanes and two narrow sidewalks on five light and elegant stone arches, was withdrawn from road traffic minutes after traffic was restored a few meters upstream by the Mayor of Lyon (for road) and the French state engineer (the requester for higher capacity navigation thus builder of the new bridge) on the new General Kœnig bridge, with 4 3.50 m lanes and 2 2.50 m sidewalks on 3 steel spans, total length and width 108 m (354 ft) and 19 m (62 ft). The central span being specially long to leave way to future 3,000 t (2,953 long tons; 3,307 short tons) river convoys in this high-curvature section of the River Saône, the two lateral spans were made wider and heavier. The metal deck, in one piece by assemblage on site of nine parts brought by road, is specially thin to give way to the said future high-capacity navigation convoys while avoiding raising the access roads and subsequent annoyances to residences. The old Pont de Serin was removed by explosives on 14 Jul 1971 (a day when river navigation is shut).

=== Passerelle de l'Homme de la Roche (1989) ===
A bridge was built in 1911–1912 between the Quai Saint Vincent and the Place de L'Homme de la Roche. Along less than 100, the bridge consists of a 5 m road and two sidewalks of 1.25 m (4 ft 1 in). It was the only bridge, the bridge with St. Vincent, not destroyed in 1944 by German forces, so it allowed the ^{1 st} division French free to return to Lyon on September 3, 1944 to liberate the city. Considered too old and dangerous, it was demolished in 1986–1987. It was replaced in 1989 by a temporary metal bridge, made in Villefranche-sur-Saône and sent by barge. But this bridge has the particularity to finish almost in cul-de-sac at the foot of a hill next to La Croix-Rousse and the other from that of Fourviere. Reconstruction is not really considered urgent and the temporary pedestrian bridge is still in place.

=== Passerelle Saint-Vincent (1832) ===
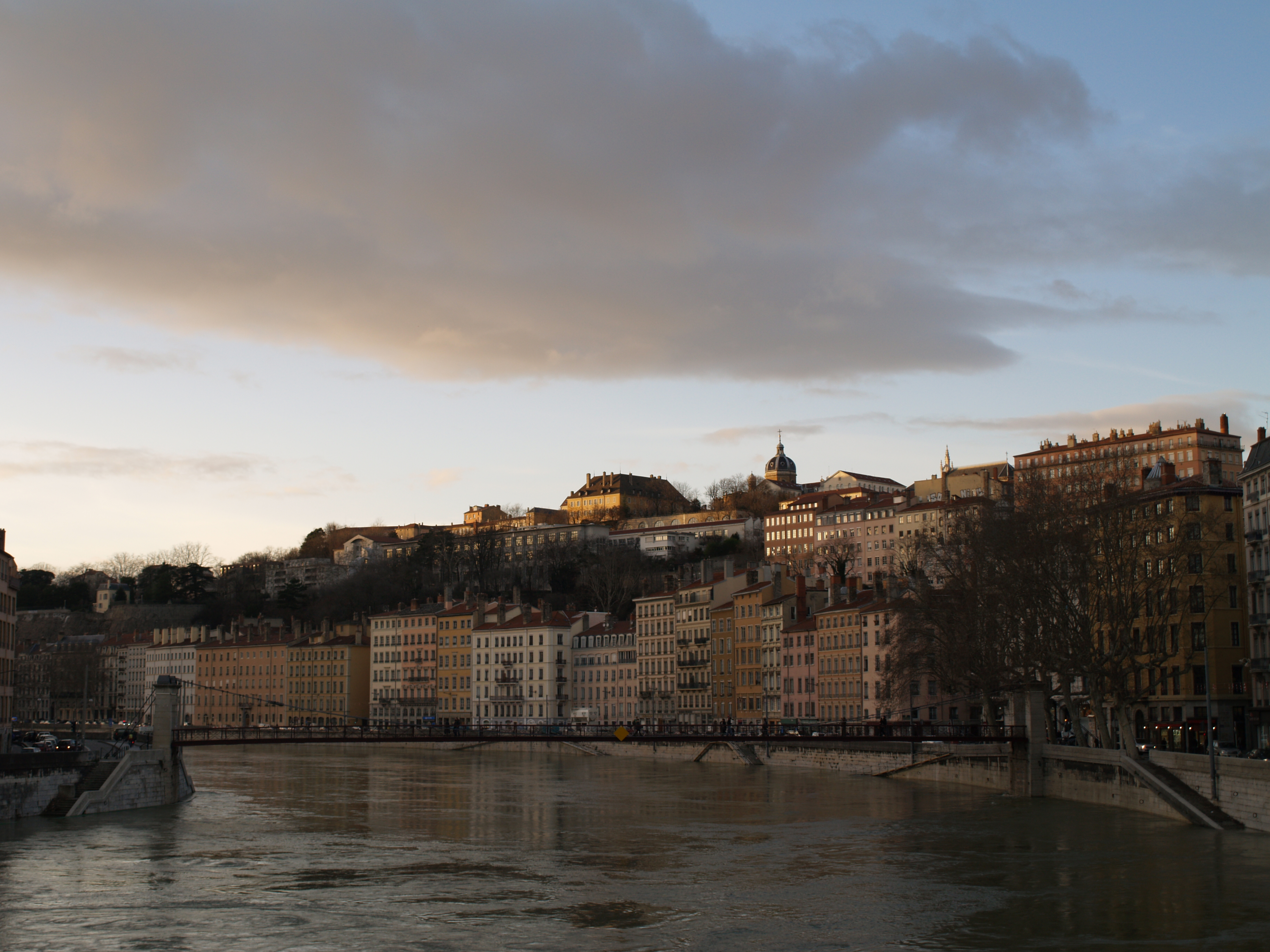
Passerelle Saint-Vincent and the quays of the Saône

The first bridge, built in 1637 by engineer Jean Christophe Marie, was swept away by ice in 1643. A new bridge replaces the 1656, but met the same fate as its predecessor in 1711. It was again replaced in 1777 by a new bridge, along with less than 80 m wide and 7 m (23 ft). In the 1830s, a project is developed to replace the Saint-Vincent bridge, too old and poorly placed. It proposed to build a new bridge further downstream and to replace the Saint Vincent bridge by a simple bridge. In 1827, it gave the company Tarpin the task of building the two bridges. The Saint Vincent bridge opened to the public at the end of 1832. In 1840, the bridge deck was damaged by flooding. It was repaired and has not needed major work since then. The bridge is 76.50 m long and 2.80 metres wide.

=== Pont la Feuillée (1949) ===
The first Pont la Feuillée opened to the public on 28 September 1831. At seven meters wide, it consisted of a central span of 67 m based on two batteries located near the banks. Damaged by floods in 1840, it was rebuilt and reopened on 21 November 1841. In 1887, its status was of concern, but it was not demolished until 1910. Two years later, a new metal structure was built with piles of Porcieu-Amblagnieu stone. In 1936, a barge struck a pile of the bridge, which collapsed, taking with it most of the structure and a number of bystanders, most of whom drowned. It was then replaced by a steel bridge with multiple arches, which was totally destroyed by the Germans in 1944. The engineer Mogaray rebuilt it in 1949, with two cantilevers embedded in shore abutments covered in stone.

=== Pont Change (disappeared) and Pont Maréchal Juin (1973) ===
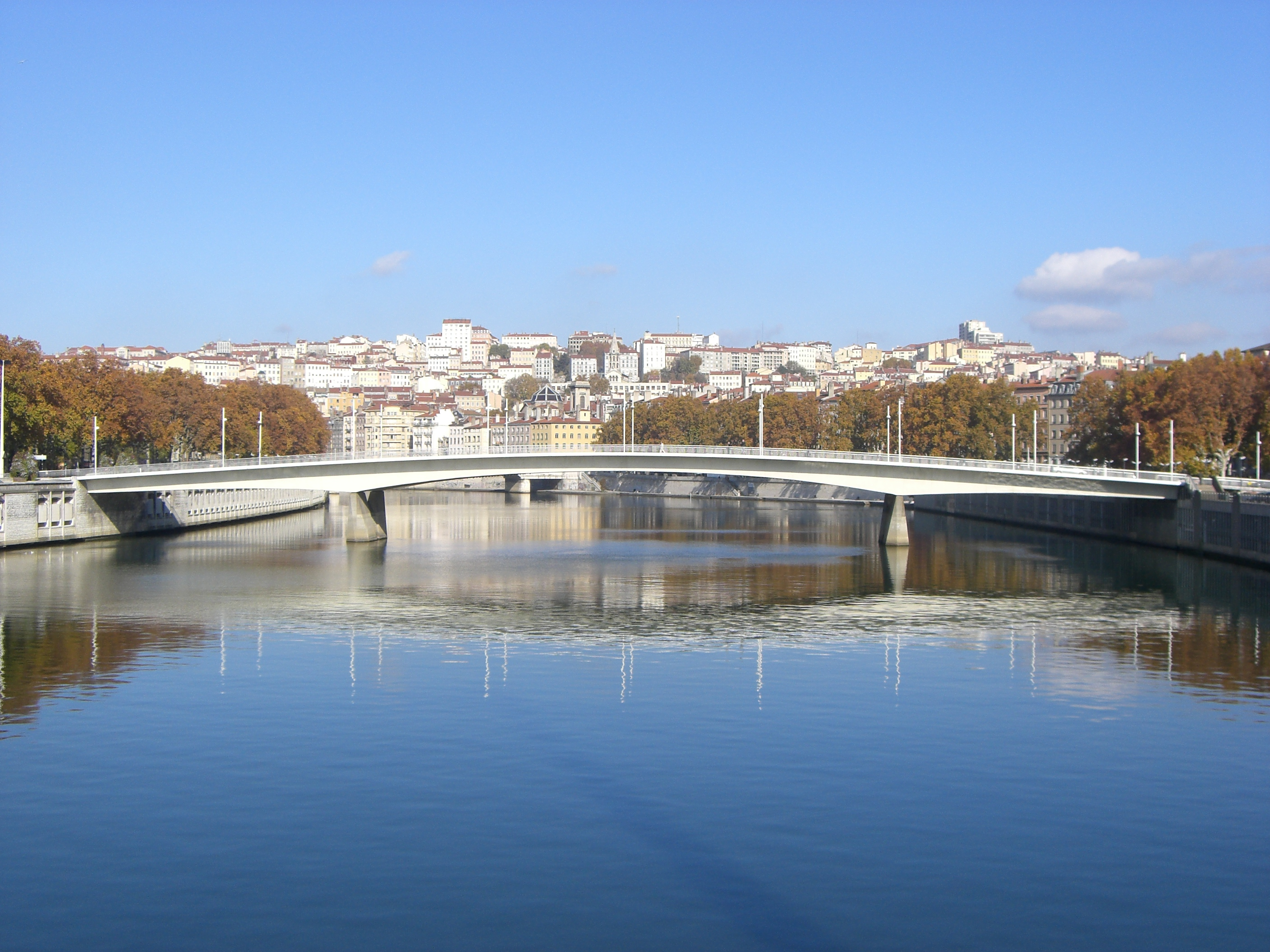
The bridge Maréchal June

The first bridge over the Saône was built around 1070 using stones from the ruins of ancient Fourviere and La Croix-Rousse. Consecrated in 1076 by Humbert, archbishop of Lyon, it connected the two sides of the city: on one side, rue Mercière and the Church of St Nizier; on the other, the Exchange, at the heart of Vieux Lyon, where fairs were held and commerce conducted. This stone bridge was composed of eight strong arches anchored on the rocky bed of the Saône. Located near the left bank, a single arch, called "the wonderful arch" (or the arch of wonders) or "deceptive rapids of death", allowed the passage of ships. The entrances of the bridge were covered with three to four storey houses and houses primarily of goldsmiths. At the centre, a chapel was stood, although this was replaced in the early nineteenth century with a niche for firefighters.

In 1842, the bridge was demolished. It was replaced in 1847 by a new bridge a few meters downstream, more compatible with the requirements of inland waterways. The following year it was extended thanks to corbel arches and changes to a width of approximately 14.5 m (48 ft). Over the centuries, it changed its name several times: Pont de Pierre (attested as early as the thirteenth century but also as late as 1810), Pont de Saône (around 1680), Pont Nemours (name attested in 1844 and officially awarded on 15 January 1852), Liberty Bridge (circa 1849). Ultimately, the name 'the Exchange bridge', attested from the eleventh century, was the one which remained.

Because it was seen as too difficult to navigate and did not satisfy changing traffic needs, the bridge was demolished in 1974 and replaced by the bridge Maréchal Juin built 200 m downstream to align with Rue Grenette. The new bridge, designed by architect Gilbert Lamboley, was built between 1971 and 1973 under the direction of the engineer Merlin. It was inaugurated on 8 December 1973. At 131.80 m long, it has a surface of 14 m (46 ft), surrounded by streets of 4 m (13 ft).

=== Passerelle du Palais de Justice (1983) ===
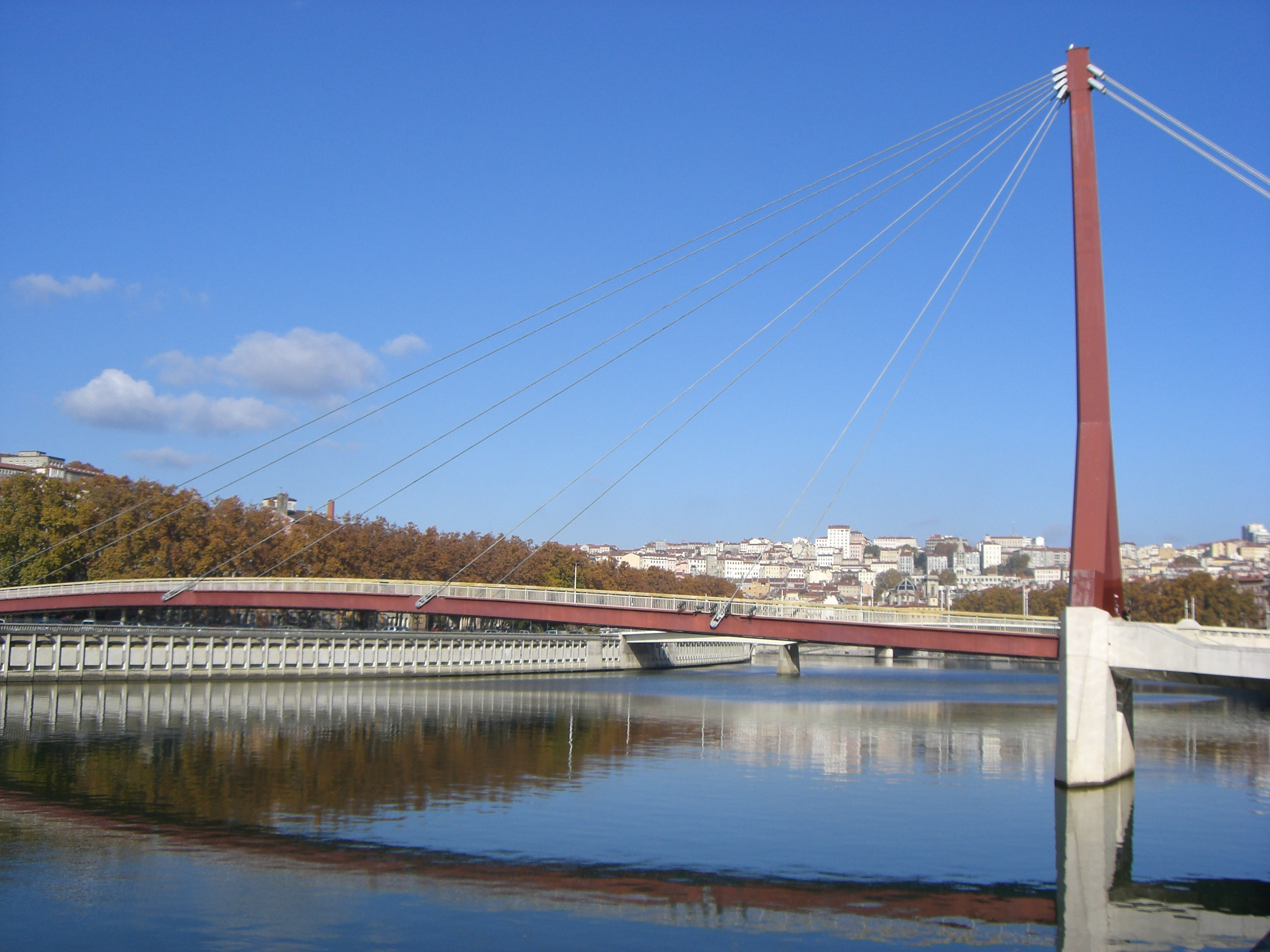
Gateway Courthouse, its single pylon and cables

A first bridge appears to have been established in 1638 at this location. Consisting of ten arches, it was destroyed in 1778 because of its disrepair. It was replaced in 1780 by a bridge consisting of a chain of twelve vessels, of which two mobiles. Volant commonly named bridge, it is also known as Forest or bridge deck Célestins. The flying bridge was washed away in part by the melting ice on 18 January 1789, then completely during the winter 1795.

It was replaced in 1797 by a wooden bridge built at the initiative of William Niogret. This kept the bridge name bridge driving, but it is also called the Pont Neuf. It was damaged by the fallout of fireworks in 1820, then by the flood of 1824. It was finally destroyed in 1833 and replaced by a bridge built by the company in Seguin 1833–1834 to serve Palais de Justice. The central arch, with a range of 90 m (295 ft), was destroyed by the flood of 1840. The bridge, rebuilt in 1844, was composed of two batteries anchored near the shoreline based on an ark Central 47.70 m by two side spans of approximately 20 m (66 ft). The width of the new bridge was 4 m in addition to two sidewalks of 1 m (3 ft 3 in). The central arch was destroyed by German forces in September 1944. The bridge was reopened in January 1945.

Service Navigation obtained in 1968 the destruction of the bridge of Change and the Bridge of the Palais de Justice bridge replaced by the Marshal in June 1983, was inaugurated a new bridge designed by Gilbert Lamboley. 4 m wide, its span of 136 m is suspended by cable stays planted in a single mast anchored on the left bank of the River.

=== Pont Bonaparte (1950) ===
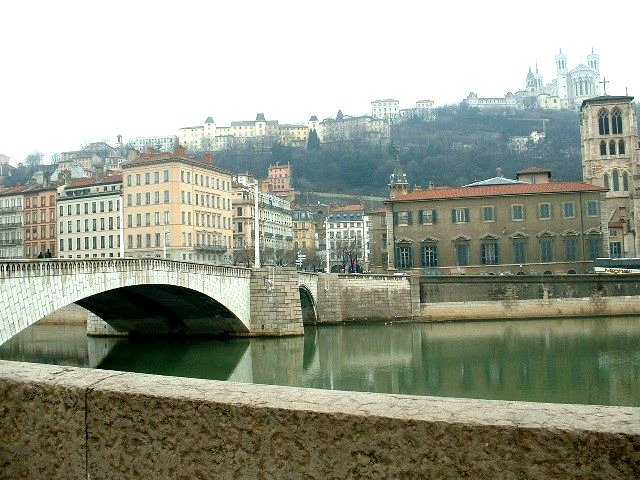
The bridge that leads to Bonaparte Old Lyon

The first wooden bridge, the bridge of the Archdiocese (or wooden bridge, county, or Bellecour Canons), was built between 1634 and 1642 by the engineer Jean Christophe Marie. The bridge was regularly hit by floods and in 1709 five arches and four blades were removed. The bridge was rebuilt in 1732 and demolished 49 years later. Work began on a new bridge, but was regularly interrupted. Construction actually began in 1786 and finished in 1807 under the direction of the engineer Carron. The City Council named the bridge Pont Tilsit. Built in Villebois stone, the bridge consisted of five arches reaching 148 m in length. The pillars of the bridge based on rocks from the excavation of the Quai Pierre Scize. The route of the "highway of Provence" was diverted from the bridge du Change to the bridge Tilsit. The bridge, too low, turned into a dam during the frequent floods of the Saône. It was demolished and replaced by a higher bridge built in 1863–1864.

In September 1944 German forces dynamited the bridge, which lost its arches and from batteries. Too damaged, it was replaced by the current bridge, built between 1946 and 1950. It was composed of three arches of reinforced concrete covered with Hauteville stone. Its current name dates from 27 January 1964.

=== Passerelle Paul Couturier (1853) ===
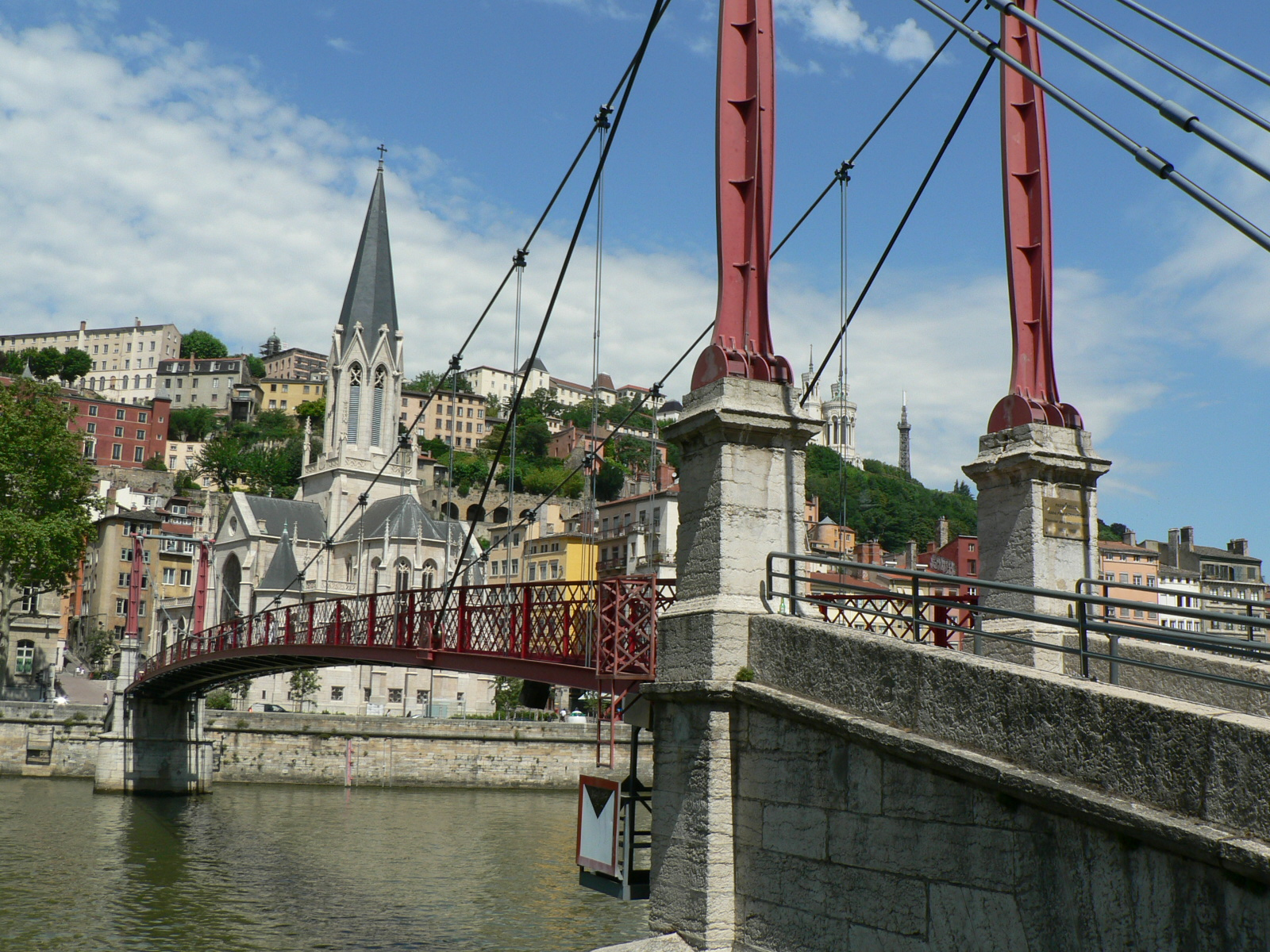
Passerelle Paul Couturier

Once called Pont Saint-Georges, this pedestrian bridge connects Ainay to the Saint-Georges neighborhood. It opened to the public on 21 October 1853. It consisted of a span of 87 m suspended by cables attached to poles anchored in the two batteries located 10 m from the shore.

Destroyed in 1944, the bridge was rebuilt the same. The 17 March 2003, it was renamed Pont Paul Couturier in honor of a priest, born in La Guillotière on 29 July 1881 and deceased 29 March 1953, who contributed to the Ecumenism.

=== Ainay Bridge (defunct) ===
The first wooden bridge was built in 1745–1749 by Degerando on behalf of Hospices Civils de Lyon at the confluence of the Rhône and the Saône (before the decline of the latter more south in the 1780s). He was baptized bridge Ainay, Carron or Arsenal. It was damaged by floods in 1791 and especially by the seat of Lyons in 1793, notably by the explosion of the arsenal. The bridge is carved by the people who get the wood it is made, and its remains were sold in 1795.

Several reconstruction projects of the bridge after another without success. Finally, in 1817, the Hospices Civils de Lyon Latombe support engineer to complete the work of the bridge, which opens on 13 October 1818. It consists of five wooden arches supported on stone piers.

This bridge is also called St. Clair Bridge (circa 1848) or Saint-Georges bridge before the bridge construction with the same name. The bridge was damaged by the floods of 1840 and 1856 despite the protection afforded by the bridge upstream Tilsit. His condition is of concern. A new bridge, consisting of three metal arches (119 m) resting on two stone piers, was rebuilt between 1897 and 1899. Dynamited by the Germans on 3 September 1944, it was not rebuilt. You can still see the trace of the departure of the arches on the docks and Fulchiron Tilsit.

=== Pont Kitchener-Marchand (1959) ===
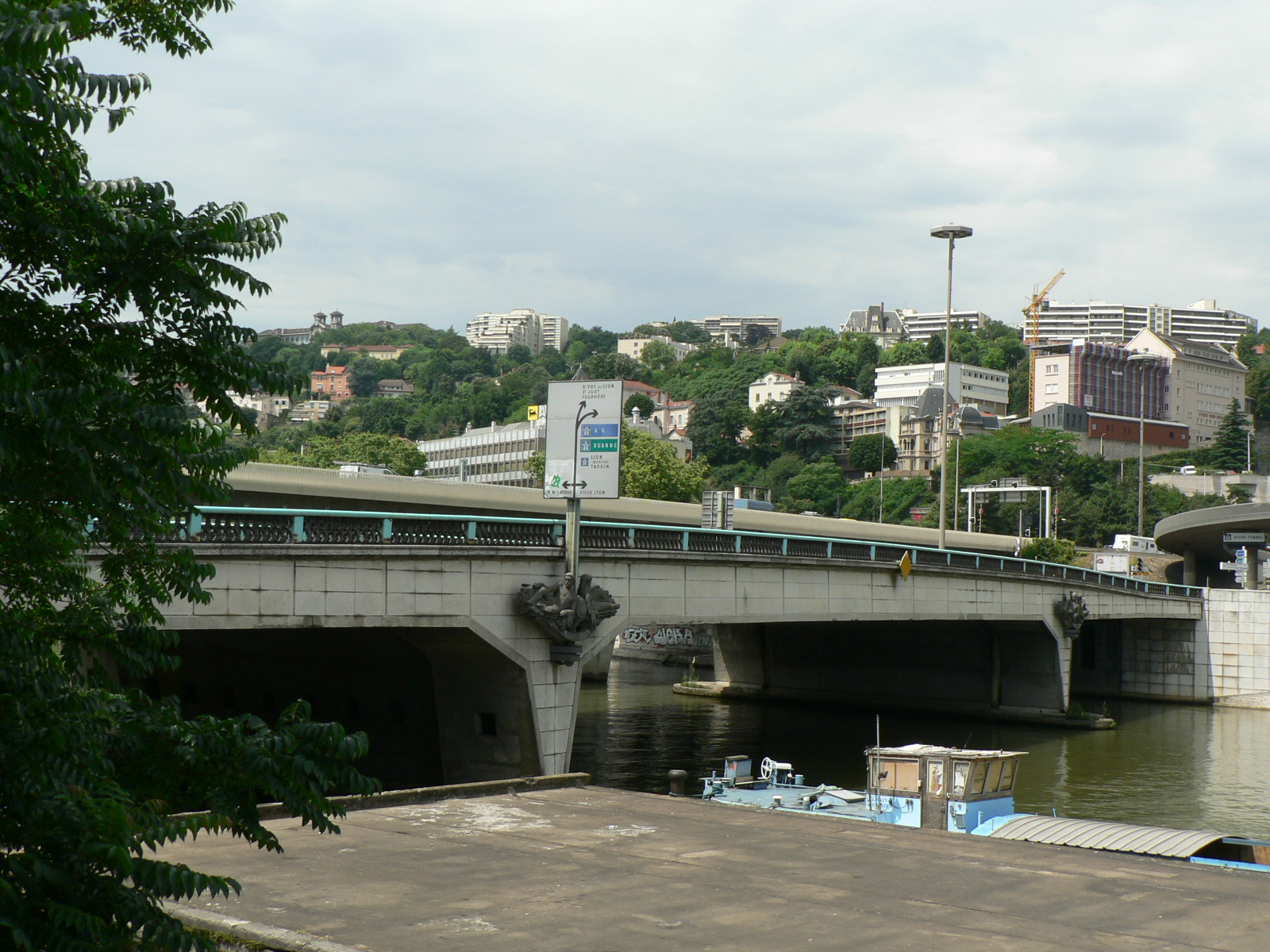
Kitchener-Marchand Bridge

To 1828, Mr Boisson de Chazournes built a wooden bridge to carry the material necessary for the development of the confluence and the future neighborhood of Perrache. This bridge was destroyed during the riots of 1834. It was rebuilt and destroyed again, this time by the flood of 1840.

A project, outlined in 1830, envisaged the construction of an east-west axis, consisting of either side of the current course of Verdun of a bridge over the Saône and two bridges over the Rhône (current Galliéni bridge). These crossings, appointed every two bridge Seguin, was completed in 1847 and open to the public in 1849, March 10 specifically for the bridge over the Saône.

The bridge consists of one large central span of 128 m (420 ft), hung two batteries. 7 m wide, the bridge allowed the construction of a roadway of 4.80 m and two sidewalks of 1.10 m each. In 1852, the bridge decks are renamed Napoleon like the course of the Republic (current cours de Verdun) moved to 1849. They become bridges and the Midi in 1871.

The bridge was considered too fragile and in 1888 was enhanced by the introduction of stone pillars and a rigid superstructure. On 17 July 1916 the bridge was renamed after Kitchener (Field Marshal and British war minister in 1914). Its deck was destroyed on 1 September 1944 but the bridge was reopened in 1949. Between 1950 and 1959 a new concrete bridge with the name pont Kitchener-Marchand was built. It is 115.80 m long with a surface of 15 m and two sidewalks of 4.50 m (15 ft).

=== Viaduct A6 (1971) ===
This bridge is a portion of the A6 autoroute. It was built between the tunnel Fourviere and clearinghouse Perrache.

=== Viaduct Quarantine (1856) ===
The rail structure is included in this list of bridges in Lyon even though his name is not official, its story deserves to be recalled.

It was started in 1854 in masonry, but on 29 November that year, without a significant flood, its two arches tilted left, no doubt for lack of foundation, and blocked the river. It needed to be replaced quickly to connect the station to Vaise Perrache, then under construction and the PLM company chose a simple and aesthetically: that of a simple steel beam placed on a single battery in the middle of the Saône, completed by the end of 1856.

At the beginning of the 20th century, Lyon finds that his department the silhouette of the city and calls for his reconstruction. The company PLM, very reluctant, eventually performed; then built on a metal bridge, which expands, at the expense of the City, the underpasses on the docks and got on the current profile that is only slightly altered in 1944 as artificers German found that they did not need to completely destroy the transition.

=== Ponts de la Mulatière (20th century) ===
A first bridge was built by the Compagnie Perrache between 1776 and 1782. Officially called Pont Bellevue, it is commonly called the Pont de La Mulatière, the name of the hamlet which became common in 1885. Less than a year after its construction, this bridge was swept away by a flood on 15 January 1783. The engineer Lallier rebuilt a new wooden bridge 250 m long consisting of eleven spans. It was opened by the company Perrache in 1792, but the following year was severely damaged in the siege of Lyon.

In the late 1820s, construction of the railway line Lyon Saint-Étienne required the digging of the Mulatière tunnel and construction of a rail bridge. Séguin The company built a new bridge railroad in the alignment of the tunnel and demolished the old bridge, which was in very poor condition. The bridge, officially called Pont Orléans but still known as bridge Mulatière, opened to traffic on October 1, 1830.

The new bridge consisted of six wooden arches, was 18 m wide and 151.20 m (496 ft) long. It was carried away, like many bridges in Lyon, by the flood of 1840. A new bridge was quickly built, then two new bridges, but without success. In 1846, a stronger bridge was finally built. In 1856, the Compagnie du Chemin de Fer de Saint-Étienne à Lyon built a bridge deck consisting of a metal-based batteries masonry stone Porcieu-Amblagnieu.

In the early twentieth century, the bridge was overloaded and in poor condition. In 1915, the bridge was rebuilt and, in 1916, rail traffic was diverted to a new railway bridge of 190.60 m in length built by Maurice Koechlin, whose structure was completely metallic. In 1936, the road bridge was rebuilt in reinforced concrete and rises to 17 m wide. Damaged during the Second World War, the bridges are operational from 1946. In 1960–1972, the quai Perrache is transformed into an (A7). A new bridge is attached to the former, a set of 38 m wide and 182.31 meters.
