= Tunnel de la Croix-Rousse =

Road tunnel in Lyon, France

Coordinates: 45°46′26″N 4°49′13″E

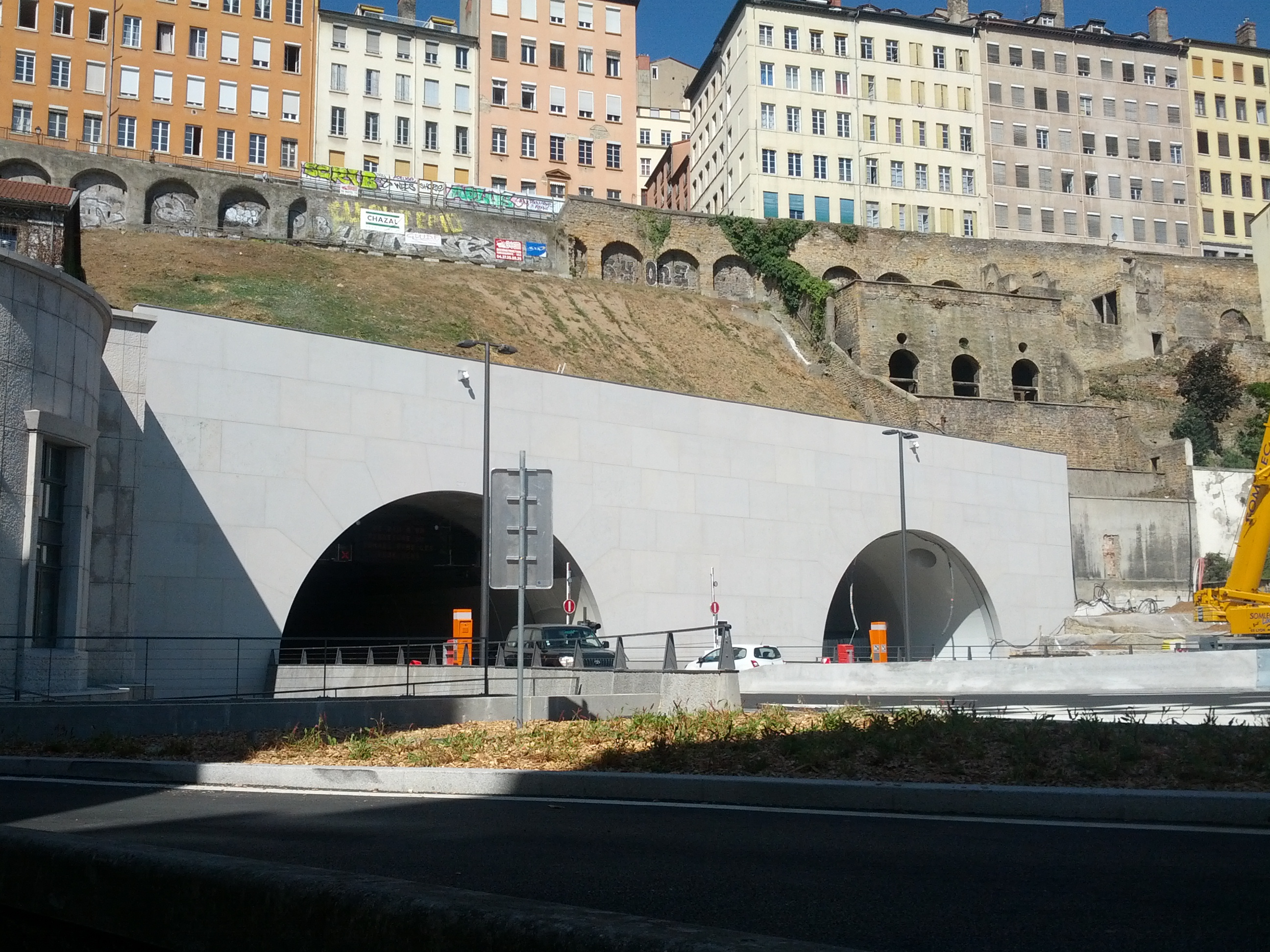
- East entrance, Rhône side.
- Interactive map of Tunnel de la Croix-Rousse

Overview
- Location: Lyon, France

Operation
- Opened: 19 April 1952

Technical
- Length: 1,782 m

The Tunnel de la Croix-Rousse is a pair of two tunnels located in the 1st and 4th arrondissements of Lyon, a road tunnel opened to traffic on 19 April 1952 and a sustainable transport tunnel opened in 2013.

== Description ==
It follows the line of the Route nationale 6 and is a link between the Rhône to the Saône rivers. It crosses the hill of la Croix-Rousse. The roadway was composed of 2 x 2 routes with no real separation of roadways until the construction of a central wall in 1999. Its use is only for vehicles with weights less than 3.5 tonnes. The tunnel length is 1,782 meters.

The speed is limited to 50 km/h (30 km/h when it rains) and an automatic radar used to be located at its exit in the direction Lyon-Vaise.

A separate route for buses, pedestrians and cyclists was opened in 2013. This route is also a safety access to the car tunnel and is illuminated with colored lights, and video displays and music are played as entertainment for the pedestrians and cyclists.

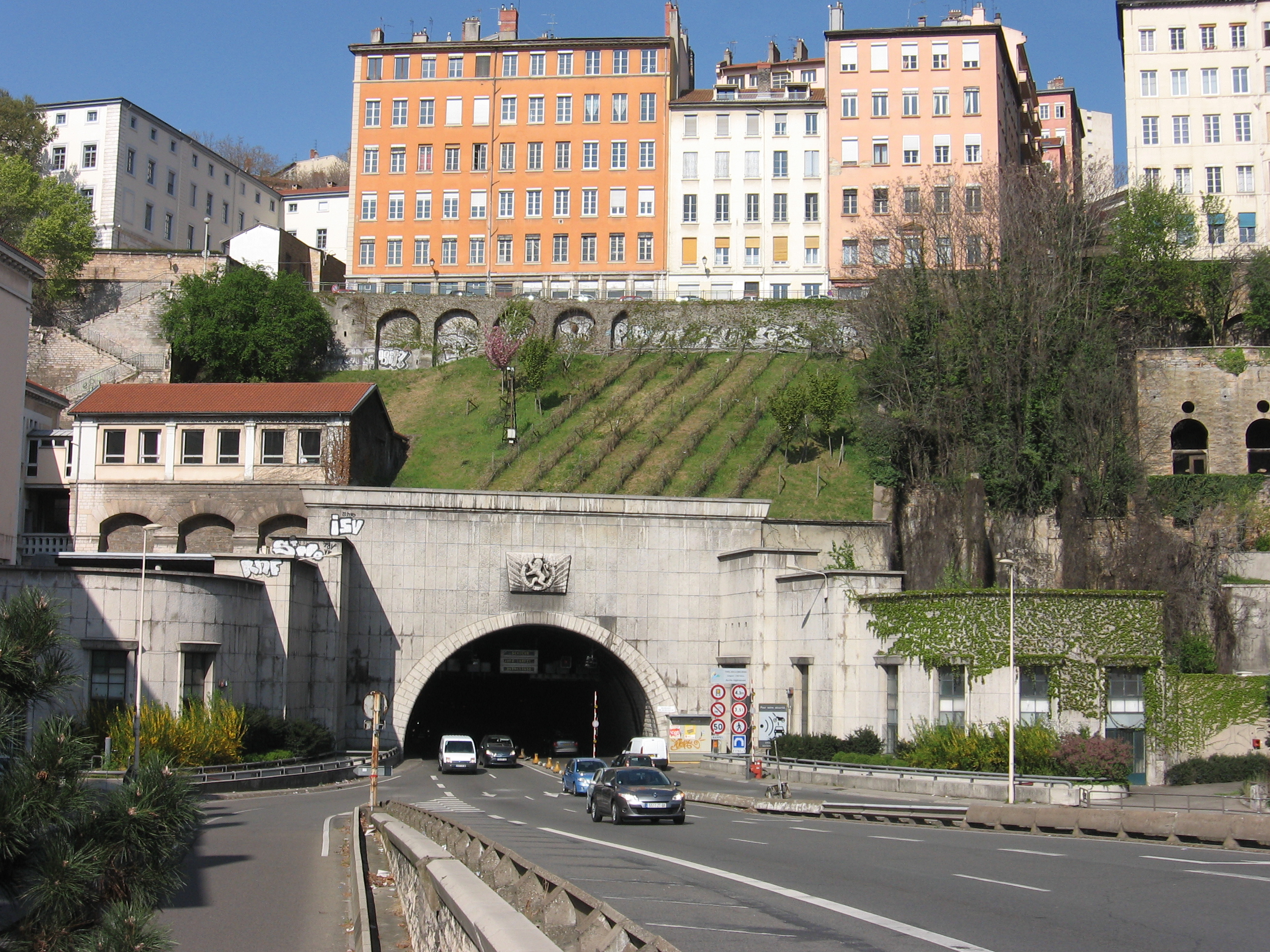
East entrance before addition of second tube.

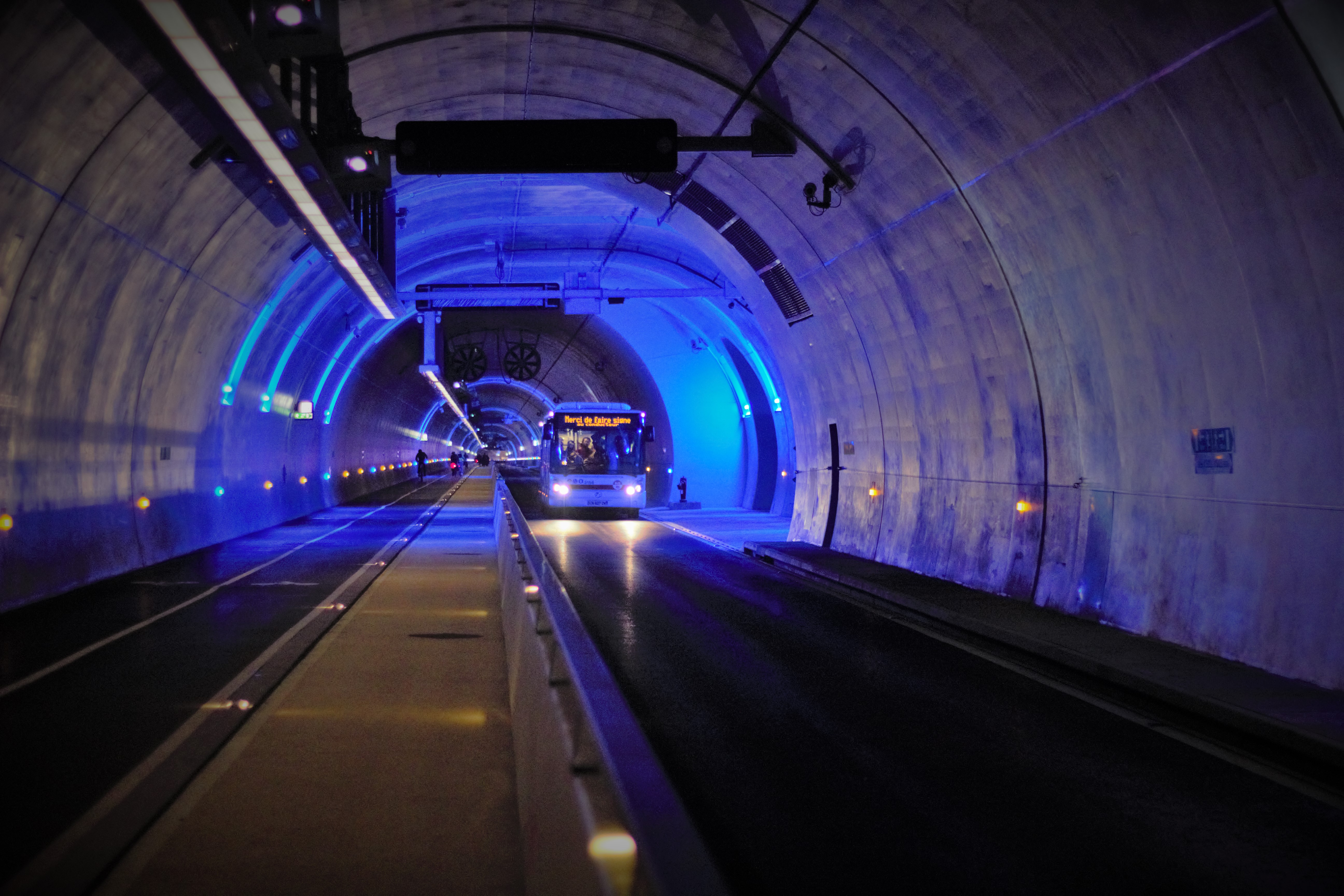
Second tube dedicated to sustainable mode of transport.

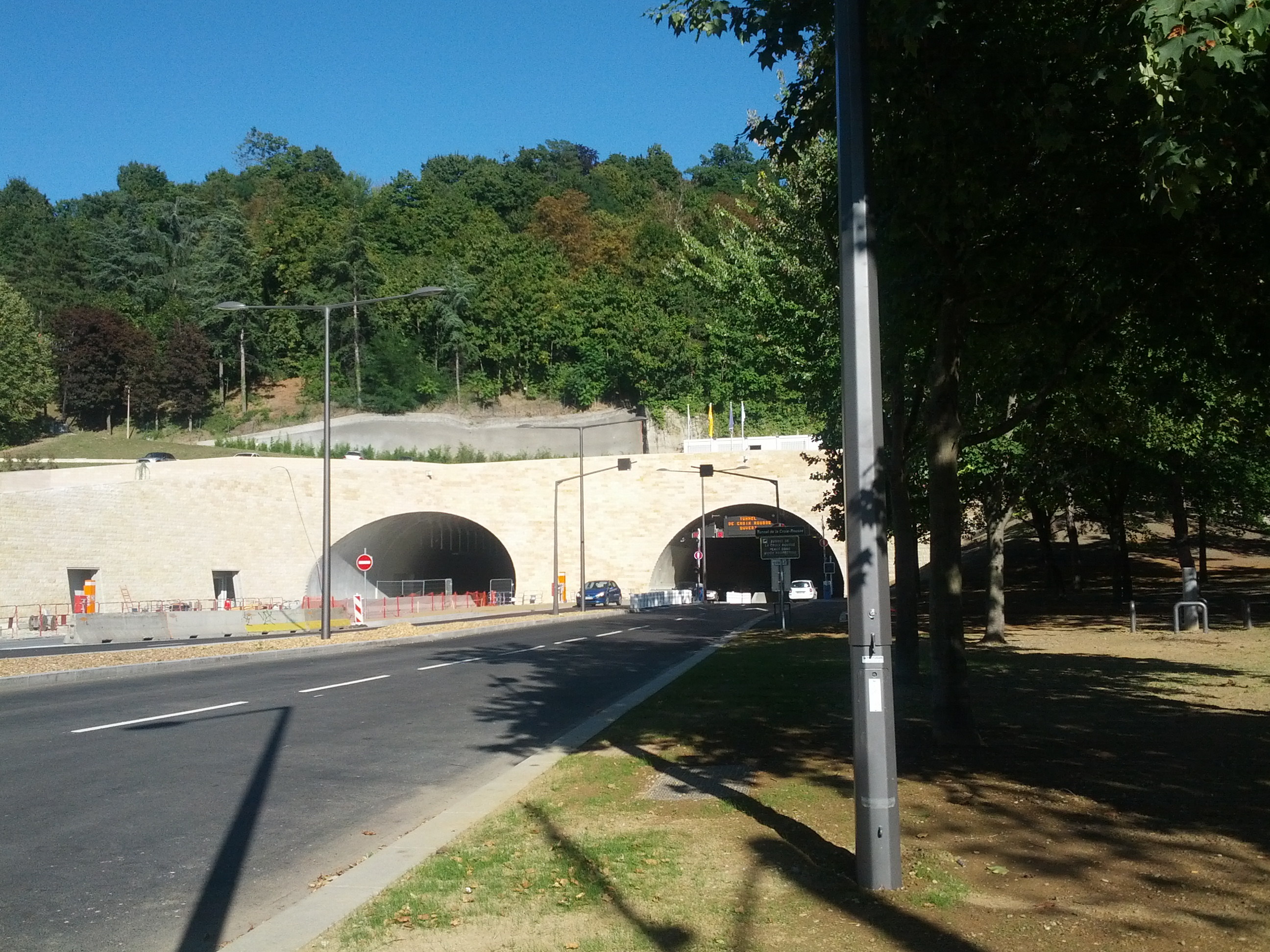
West entrance, Saône side.

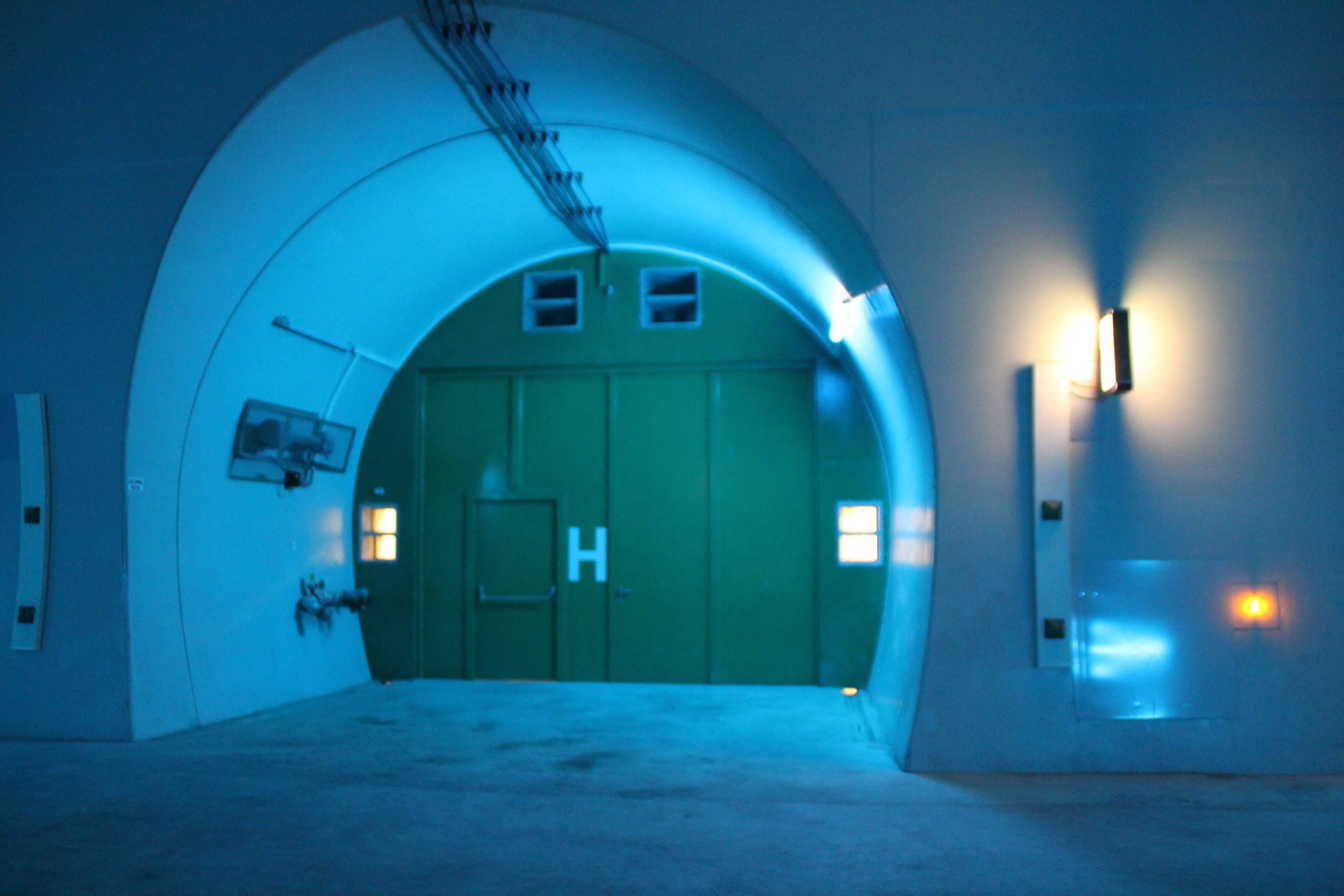
Safety access door to the car tube

== See also ==
- List of tunnels by location
- La Croix-Rousse
