= Porcieu-Amblagnieu =

- Commune
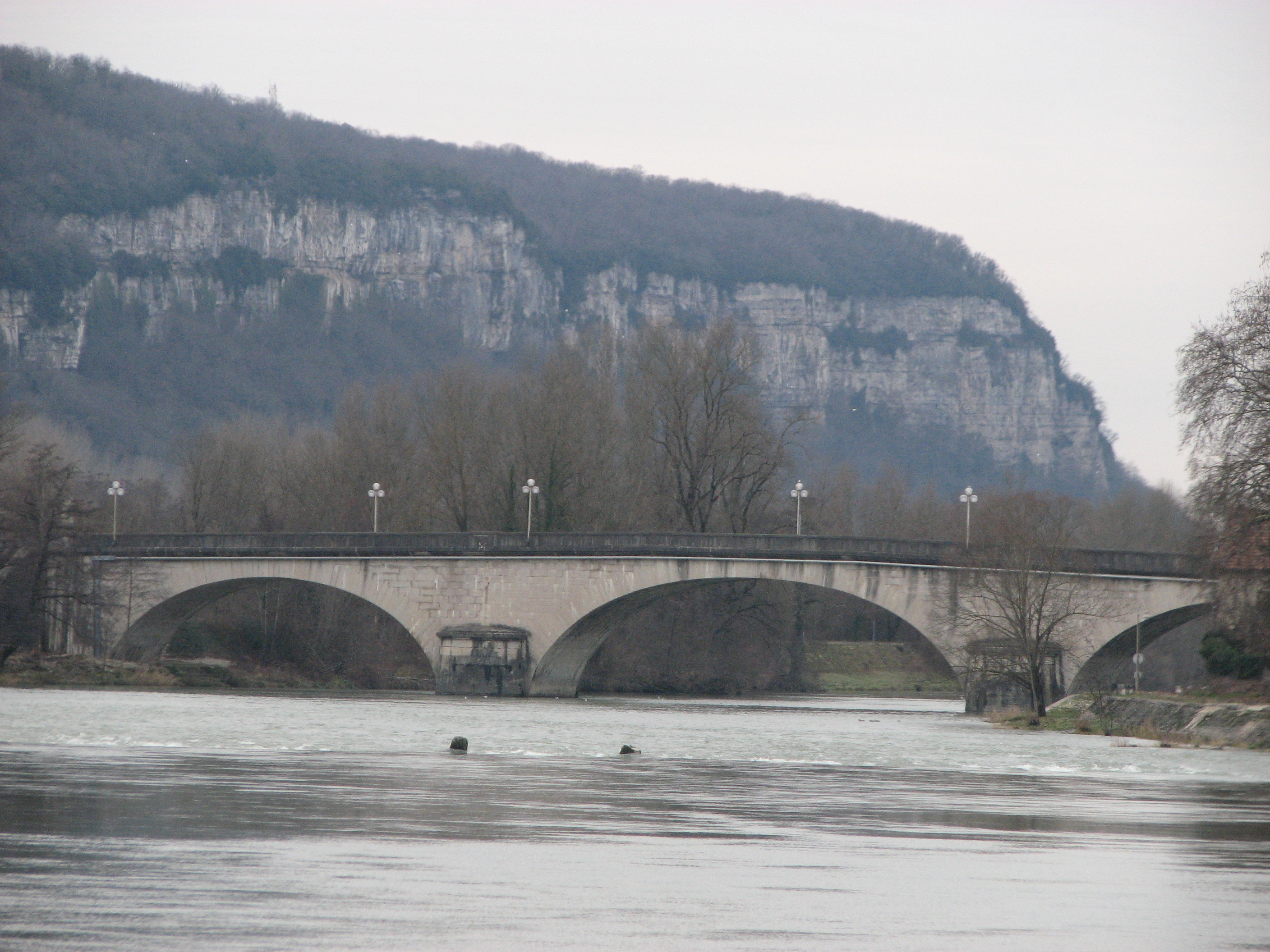
- The bridge of Sault-Brénaz
- Location of Porcieu-Amblagnieu
- Location within France Location within Auvergne-Rhône-Alpes
- Coordinates: 45°50′06″N 5°24′06″E
- Country: France
- Region: Auvergne-Rhône-Alpes
- Department: Isère
- Arrondissement: La Tour-du-Pin
- Canton: Morestel

Government
  - Mayor (2020–2026): Nathalie Peju
- Area^{1}: 15.8 km^{2} (6.1 sq mi)
- Highest elevation: 395 m (1,296 ft)
- Lowest elevation: 191 m (627 ft)
- Population (2023): 1,787
  - Density: 113/km^{2} (293/sq mi)
- Time zone: UTC+01:00 (CET)
  - Summer (DST): UTC+02:00 (CEST)
- INSEE/Postal code: 38320 /38390
- ^{1} French Land Register data, which excludes lakes, ponds, glaciers > 1 km^{2} (0.386 sq mi or 247 acres) and river estuaries.

Porcieu-Amblagnieu (French pronunciation: [pɔʁsjø ɑ̃blaɲø]) is a commune in the Isère department in southeastern France.

== Population ==
Historical population
Year	Pop.	±% p.a.
1968	1,105	—
1975	1,096	−0.12%
1982	1,099	+0.04%
1990	1,086	−0.15%
1999	1,251	+1.58%
2007	1,482	+2.14%
2012	1,670	+2.42%
2017	1,766	+1.12%
2023	1,787	+0.20%
Source: INSEE

== See also ==
- Communes of the Isère department
