= Artas, Isère =

Artas
- Commune
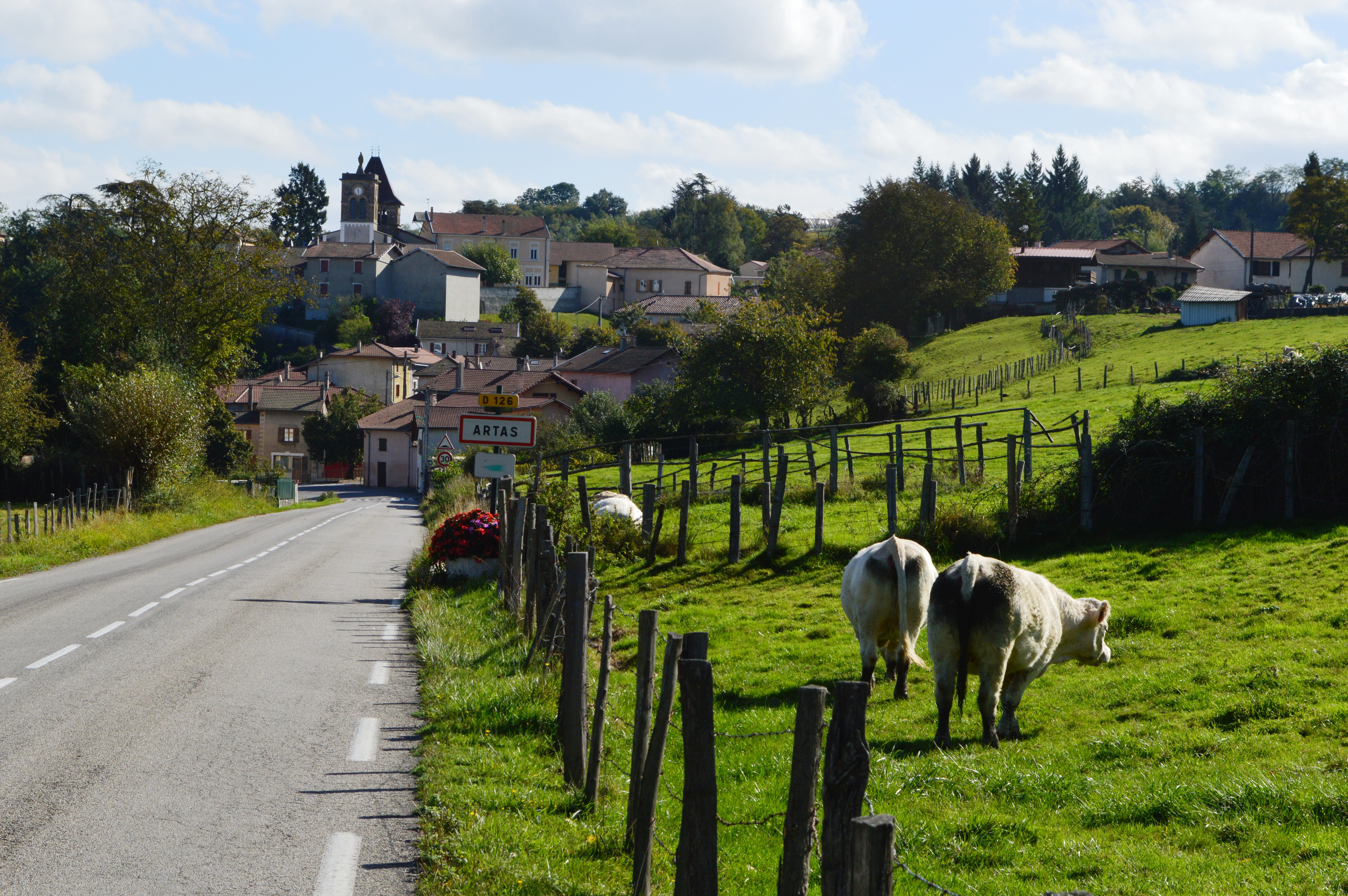
- The road into Artas
- Location of Artas
- Location within France Location within Auvergne-Rhône-Alpes
- Coordinates: 45°32′10″N 5°09′54″E
- Country: France
- Region: Auvergne-Rhône-Alpes
- Department: Isère
- Arrondissement: Vienne
- Canton: La Verpillière
- Intercommunality: Bièvre Isère

Government
  - Mayor (2020–2026): Martial Simondant
- Area^{1}: 14.15 km^{2} (5.46 sq mi)
- Highest elevation: 507 m (1,663 ft)
- Lowest elevation: 364 m (1,194 ft)
- Population (2023): 1,799
  - Density: 127.1/km^{2} (329.3/sq mi)
- Time zone: UTC+01:00 (CET)
  - Summer (DST): UTC+02:00 (CEST)
- INSEE/Postal code: 38015 /38440
- ^{1} French Land Register data, which excludes lakes, ponds, glaciers > 1 km^{2} (0.386 sq mi or 247 acres) and river estuaries.

Artas (Occitan: Artàs) is a commune in the Isère department in the Auvergne-Rhône-Alpes region of south-eastern France.

== Geography ==
Artas is located some 20 km east by north-east of Vienne and some 8 km south of Villefontaine. Access to the commune is by the D53 road from Charantonnay in the west passing through the heart of the commune and the village and continuing to Saint-Agnin-sur-Bion in the east. The D126 road comes from Roche in the north through the heart of the commune and crossing the D53 in the village before continuing to Saint-Jean-de-Bournay in the south. Apart from the village there are also the hamlets of Le Barroz, Le Revolet, Cinquin, Radoire, Tarnezieux, and La Petite-Foret. The commune is mainly farmland with scattered forests throughout.

The Ruisseau de Charavoux rises in the west of the commune and flows west to join the Ambalon near Chasse-sur-Rhône.

== History ==
In the reign of Louis XIV the Oak trees from the Artas Forest provided a large part of the wood needed to build the King's Galleys at Marseille.

Artas was the birthplace of Mother's Day in France on 10 June 1906 - two years earlier than the date of origin of 1908 claimed by the USA.

== Administration ==
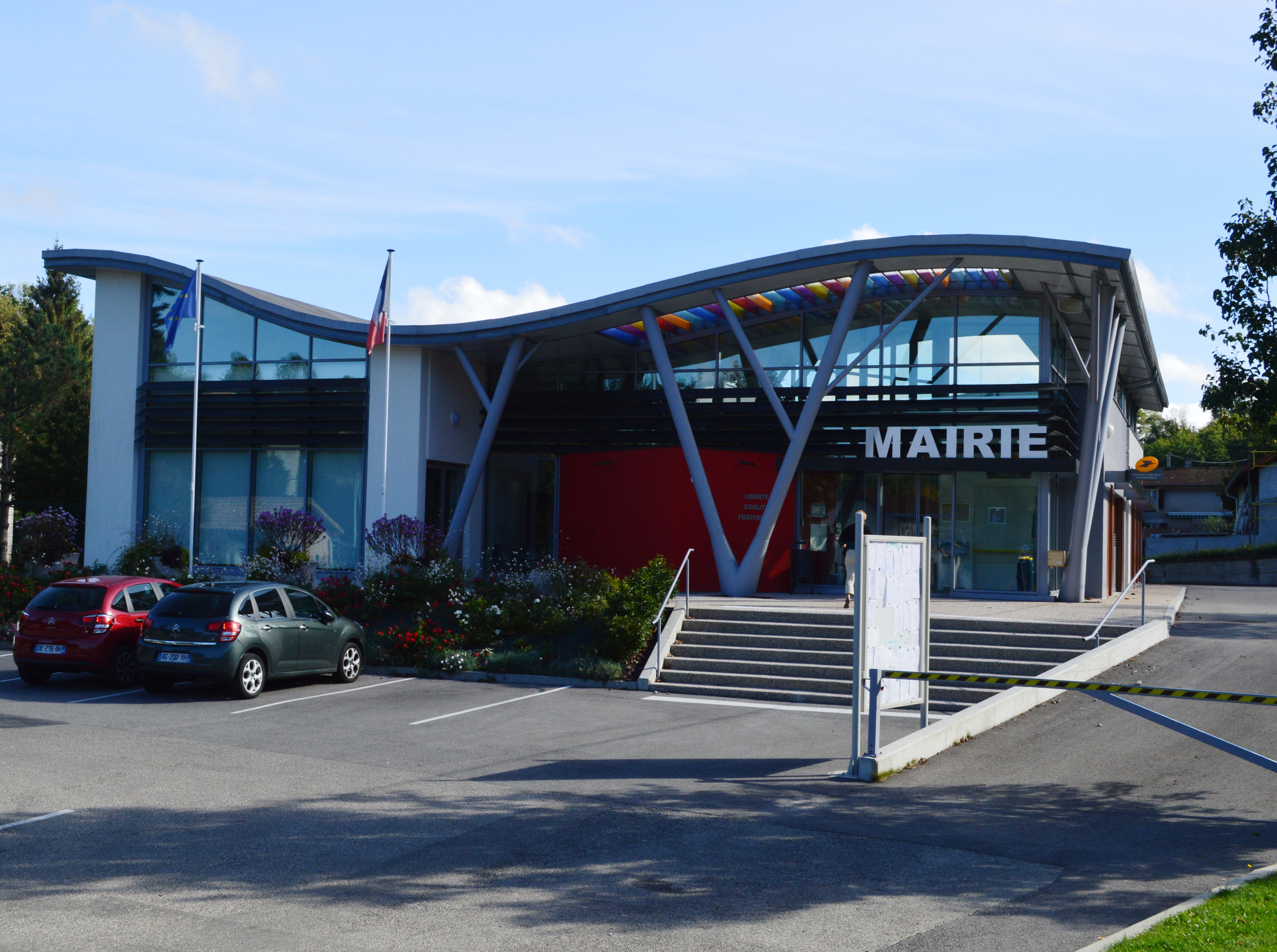
The Town Hall

List of Successive Mayors

From	To	Name	Party
2001	2014	Maurice Barale	UMP
2014	2026	Martial Simondant	

== Demography ==
The inhabitants of the commune are known as Artasiens or Artasiennes in French.

Historical population

Year	Pop.	±% p.a.
1793	1,085	—
1800	1,159	+0.95%
1806	1,101	−0.85%
1821	990	−0.71%
1831	1,253	+2.38%
1836	1,346	+1.44%
1841	1,320	−0.39%
1846	1,181	−2.20%
1851	1,325	+2.33%
1856	1,302	−0.35%
1861	1,224	−1.23%
1866	1,203	−0.35%
1872	1,212	+0.12%
1876	1,088	−2.66%
1881	1,071	−0.31%
1886	1,052	−0.36%
1891	1,045	−0.13%
1896	1,025	−0.39%
1901	986	−0.77%

Year	Pop.	±% p.a.
1906	1,000	+0.28%
1911	993	−0.14%
1921	874	−1.27%
1926	840	−0.79%
1931	793	−1.14%
1936	750	−1.11%
1946	692	−0.80%
1954	667	−0.46%
1962	646	−0.40%
1968	612	−0.90%
1975	658	+1.04%
1982	895	+4.49%
1990	1,026	+1.72%
1999	1,349	+3.09%
2007	1,573	+1.94%
2012	1,725	+1.86%
2017	1,809	+0.96%
2023	1,799	−0.09%

Source: EHESS and INSEE

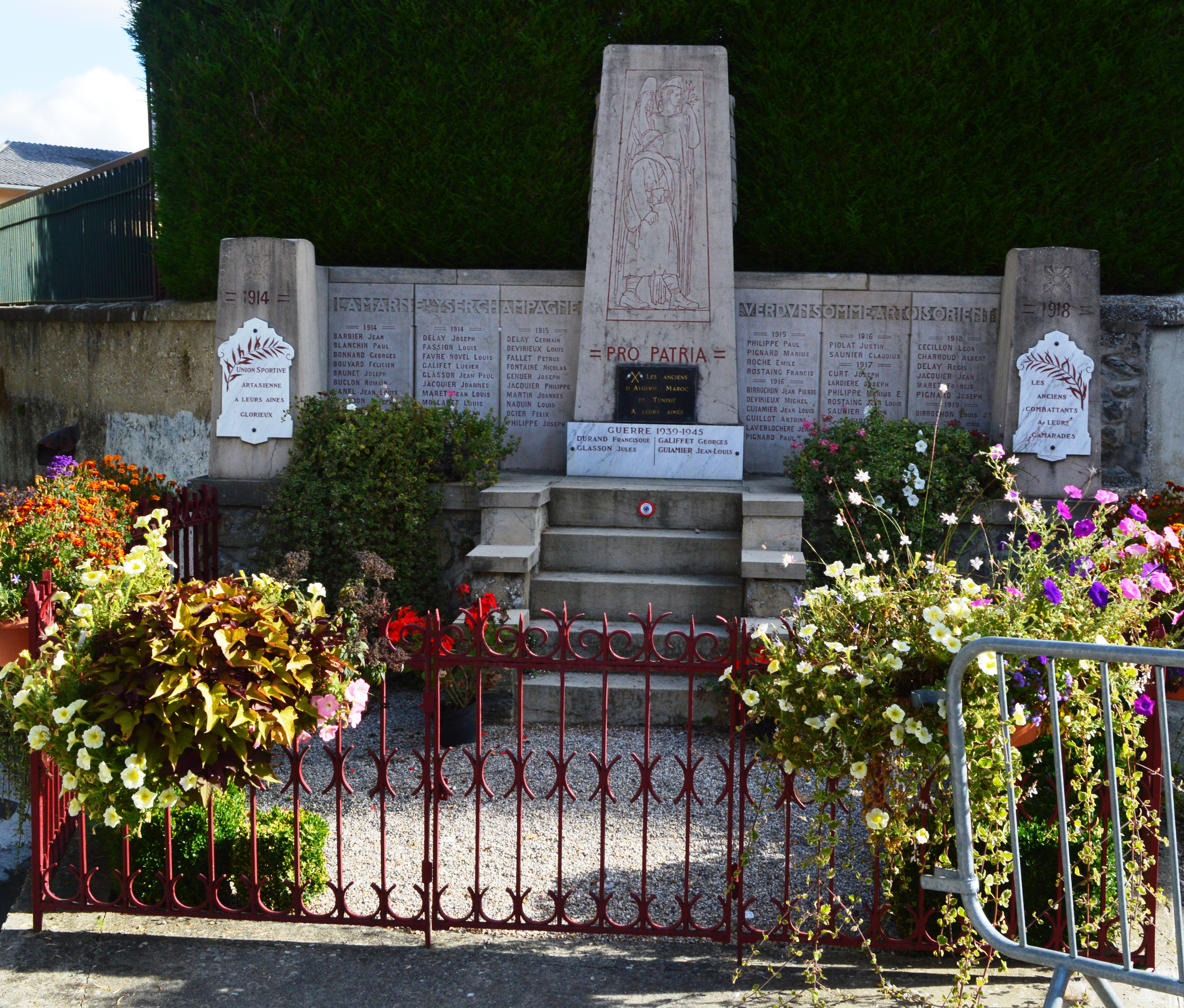
Artas War Memorial

== Sites and monuments ==
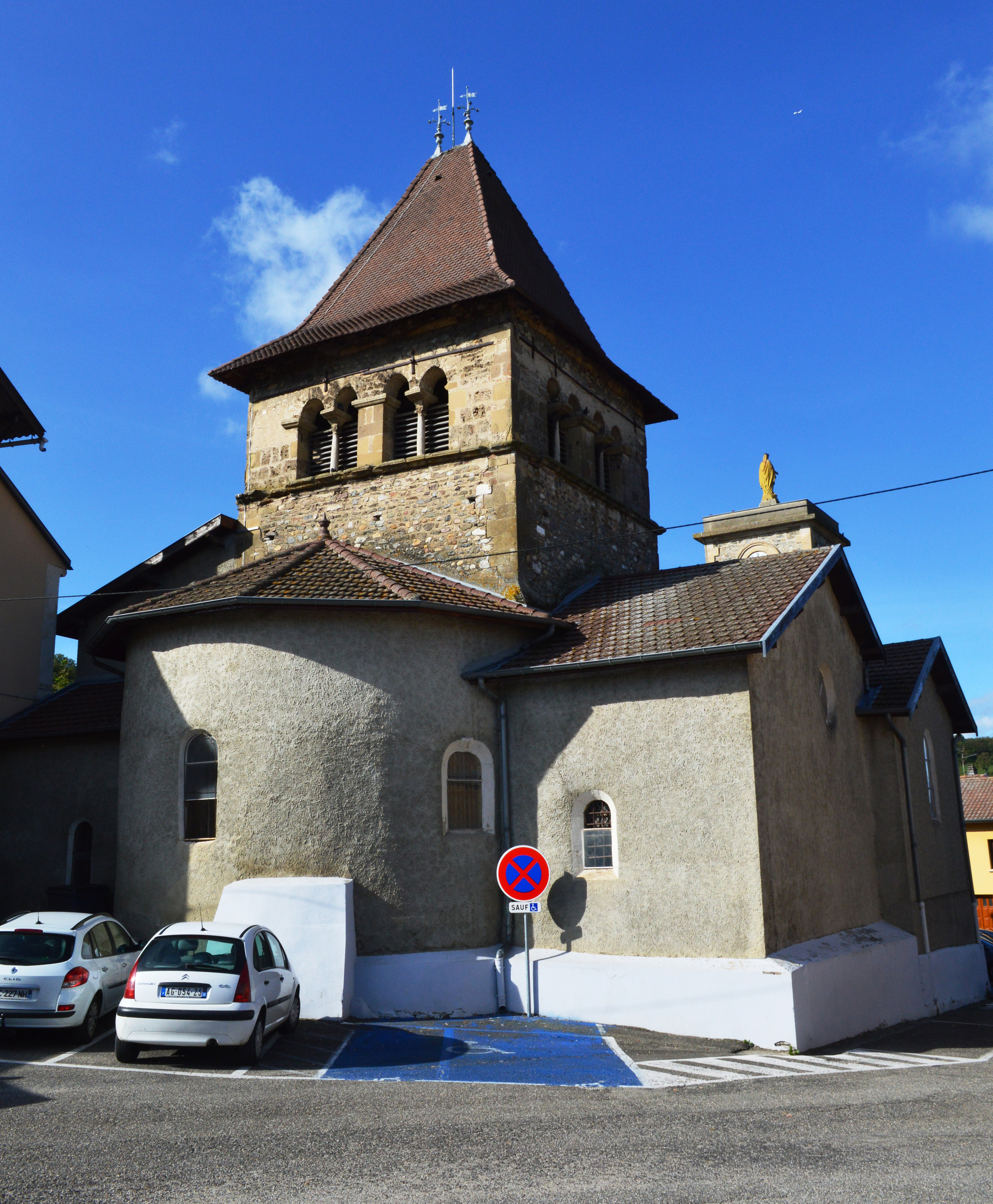
Artas Church

- A Church with two bell towers from the 12th and 19th centuries.

== Artas Picture Gallery ==
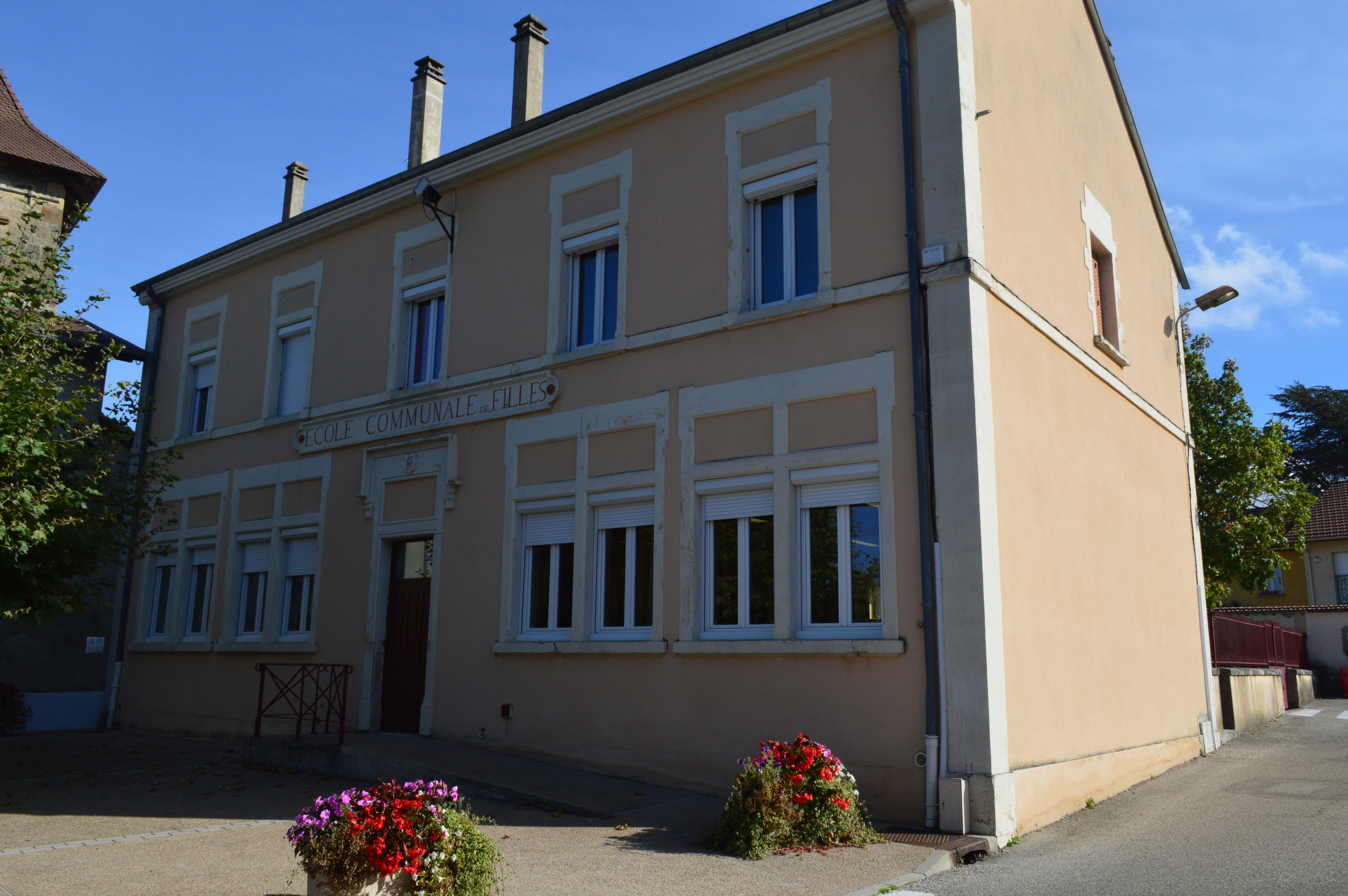
Artas Girls' School

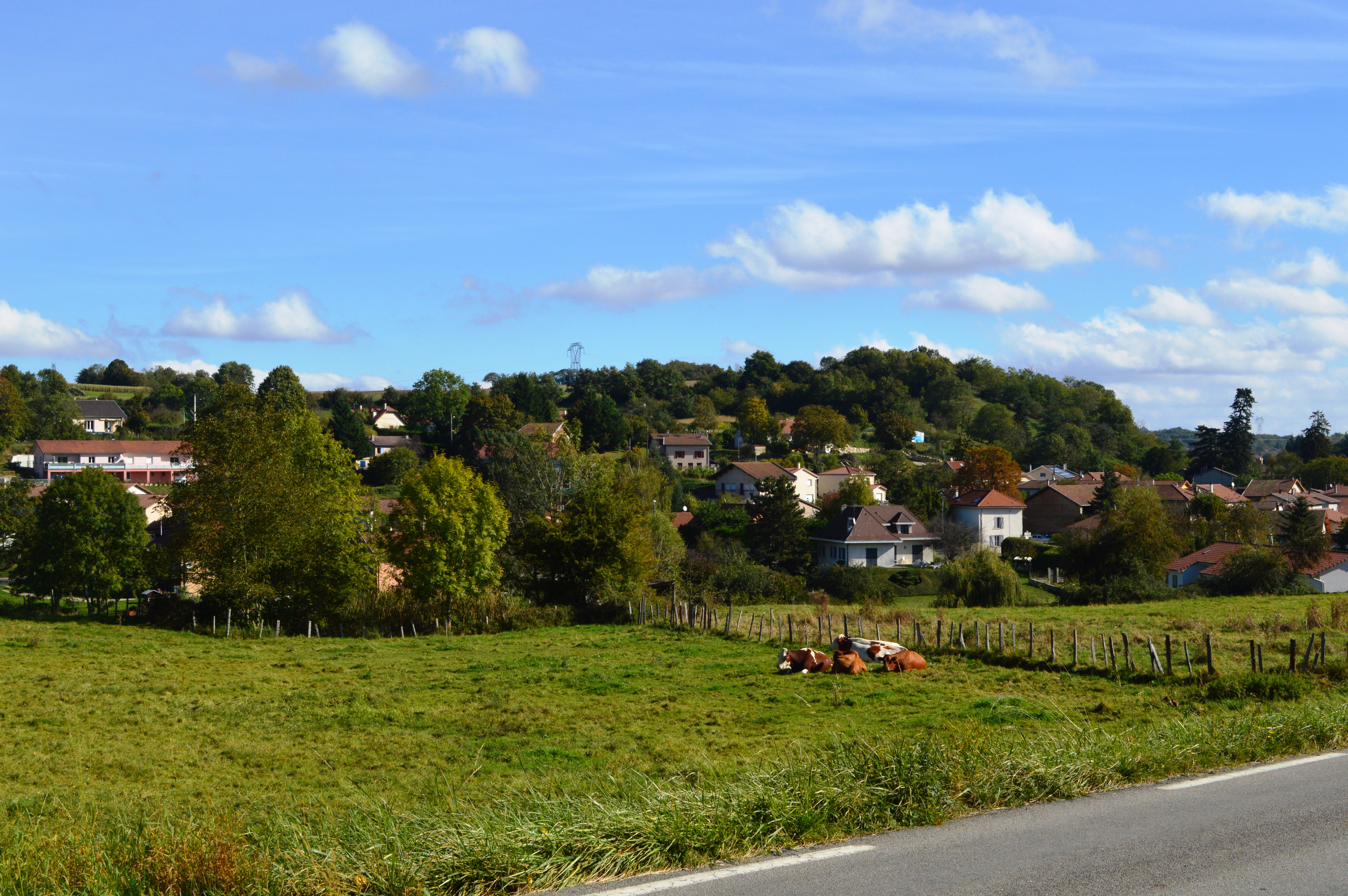
Artas Landscape

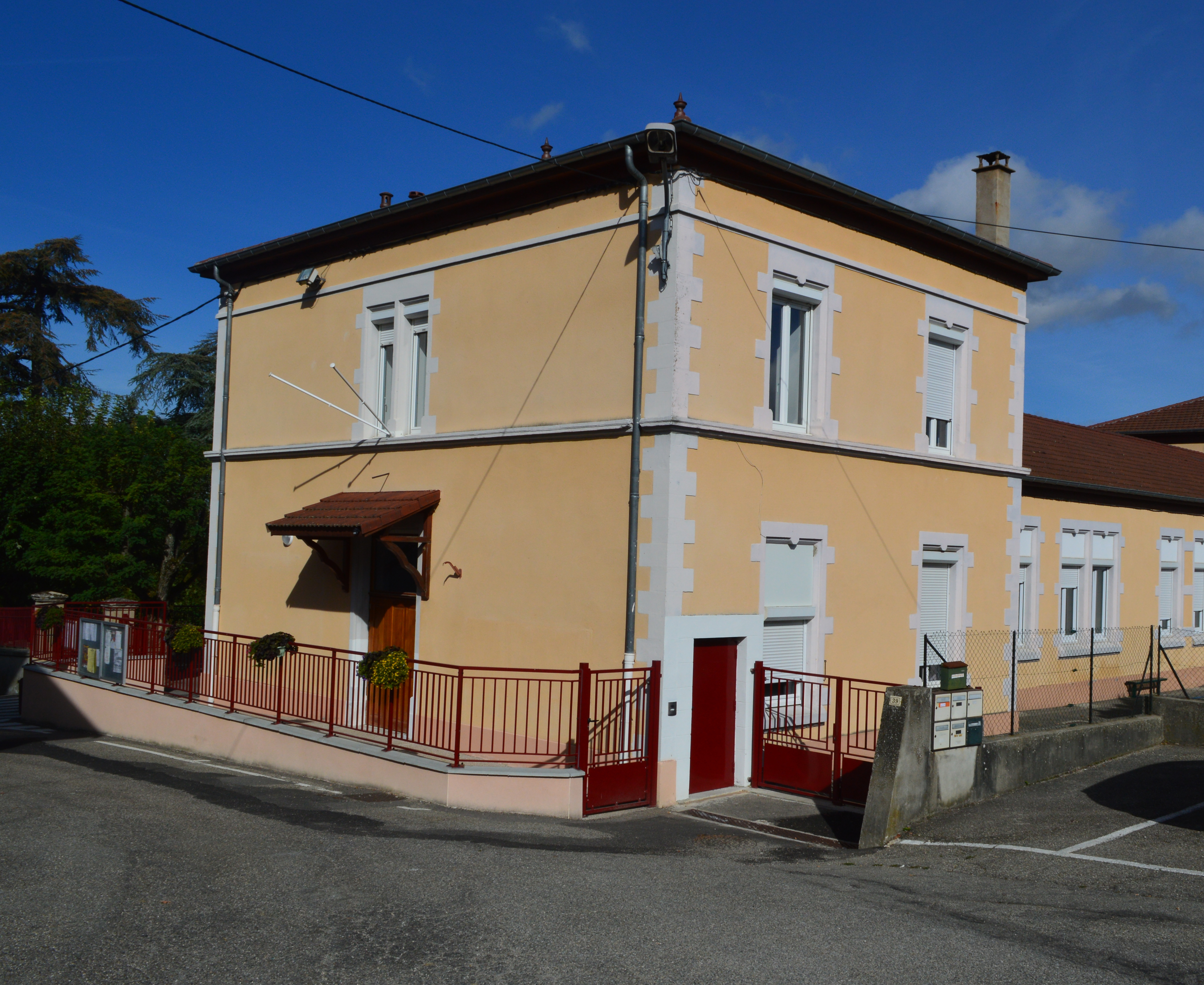
The old Town Hall

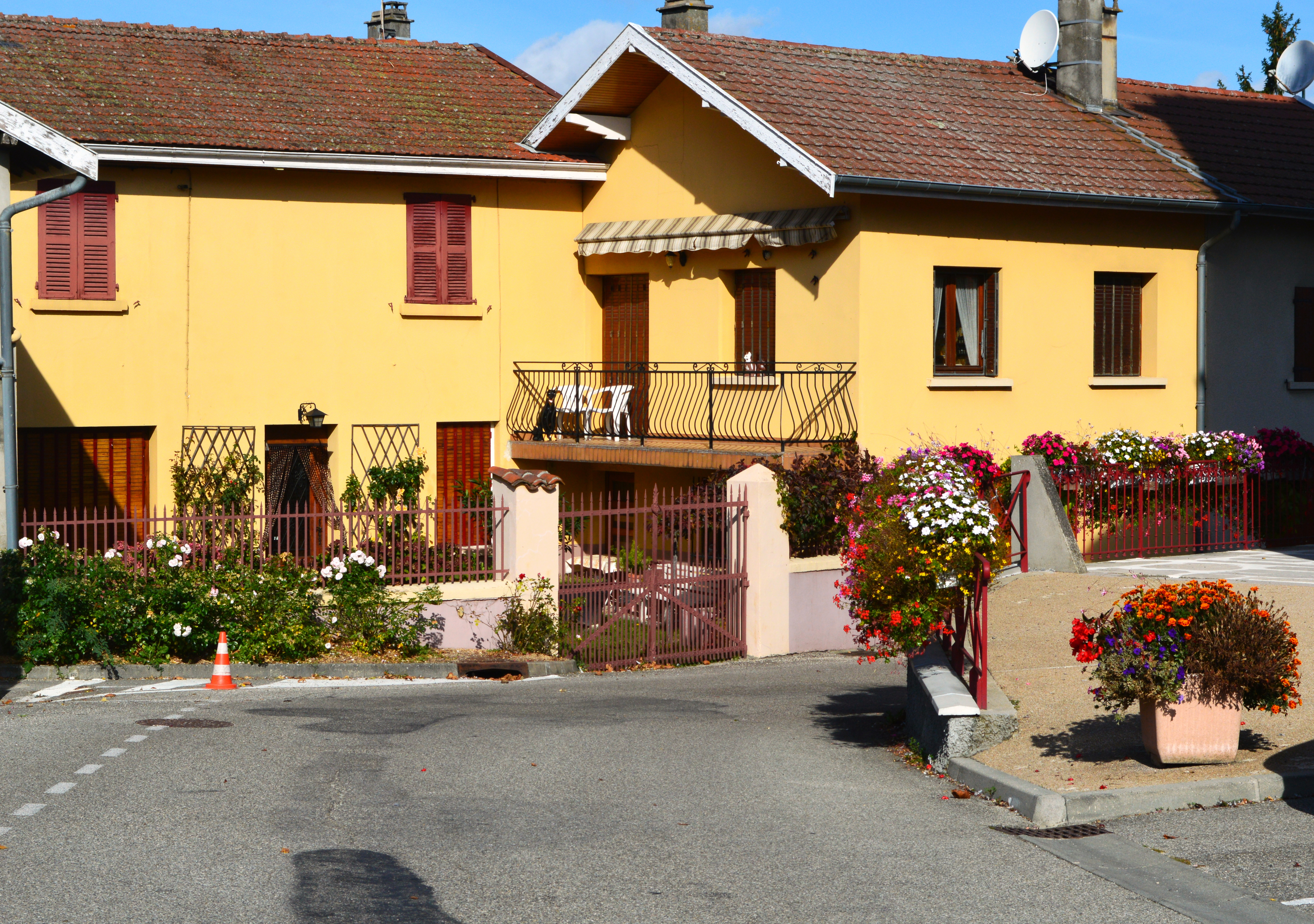
A street in Artas

== See also ==
- Communes of the Isère department
