= Grenay =

Grenay is the name of two communes in France:

- Grenay, Isère
- Grenay, Pas-de-Calais
