= Chamagnieu =

- Commune
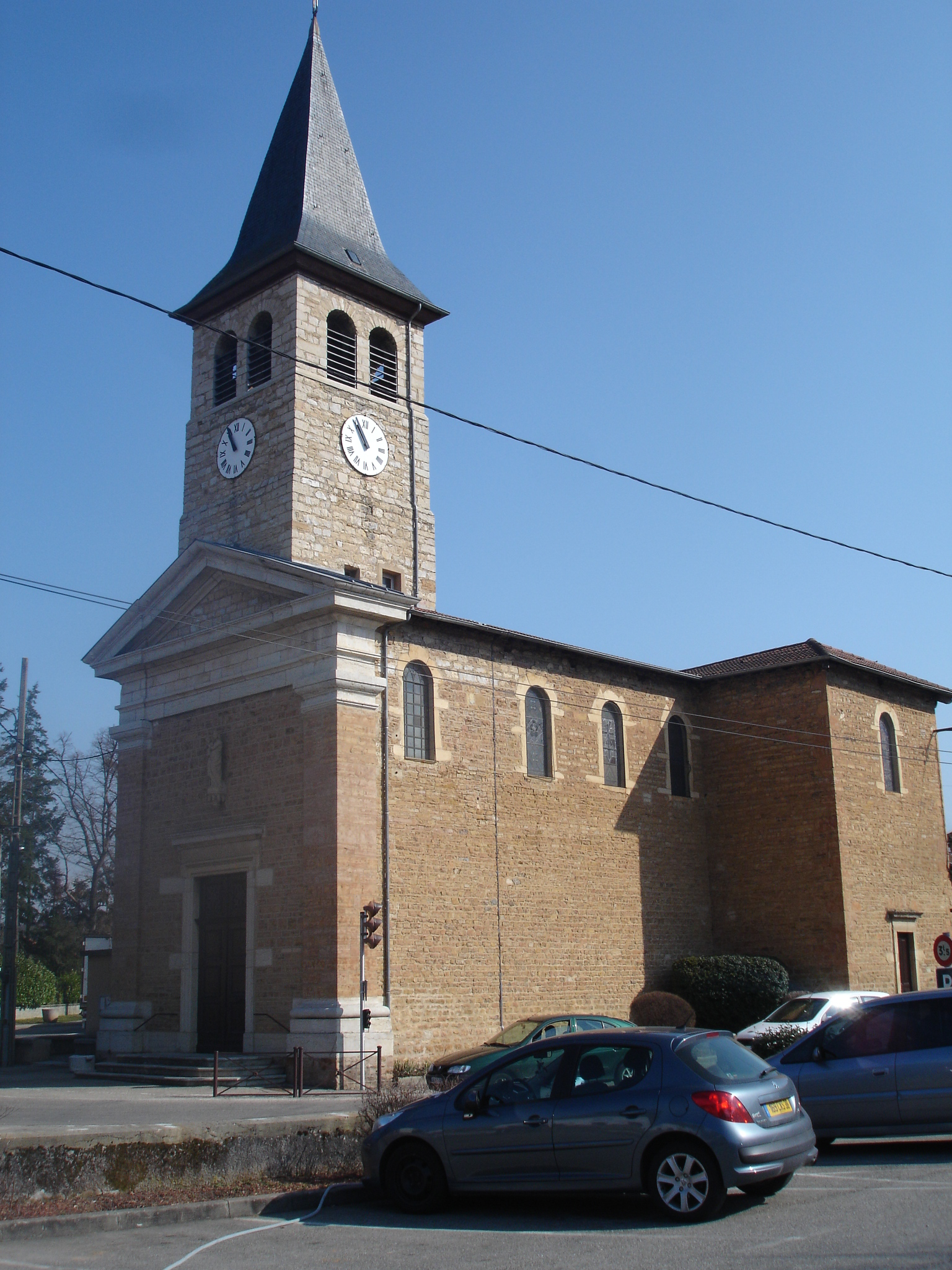
- The church of Chamagnieu

- Coat of arms
- Location of Chamagnieu
- Location within France Location within Auvergne-Rhône-Alpes
- Coordinates: 45°40′51″N 5°09′58″E
- Country: France
- Region: Auvergne-Rhône-Alpes
- Department: Isère
- Arrondissement: La Tour-du-Pin
- Canton: La Verpillière

Government
  - Mayor (2020–2026): Jean-Yves Cado
- Area^{1}: 13.7 km^{2} (5.3 sq mi)
- Elevation: 217 m (712 ft)
- Highest elevation: 341 m (1,119 ft)
- Lowest elevation: 202 m (663 ft)
- Population (2023): 1,822
  - Density: 133/km^{2} (344/sq mi)
- Time zone: UTC+01:00 (CET)
  - Summer (DST): UTC+02:00 (CEST)
- INSEE/Postal code: 38067 /38460
- ^{1} French Land Register data, which excludes lakes, ponds, glaciers > 1 km^{2} (0.386 sq mi or 247 acres) and river estuaries.

Chamagnieu (French pronunciation: [ʃamaɲø]) is a commune in the Isère department in southeastern France.

== Geography ==
The Bourbre forms the commune's northwestern border.

== Population ==
Historical population
Year	Pop.	±% p.a.
1968	432	—
1975	514	+2.51%
1982	817	+6.84%
1990	1,010	+2.69%
1999	1,180	+1.74%
2007	1,469	+2.78%
2012	1,466	−0.04%
2017	1,674	+2.69%
2023	1,822	+1.42%
Source: INSEE

== See also ==
- Communes of the Isère department
