= Saint-Quentin-Fallavier =

Saint-Quentin Fallavier
- Commune
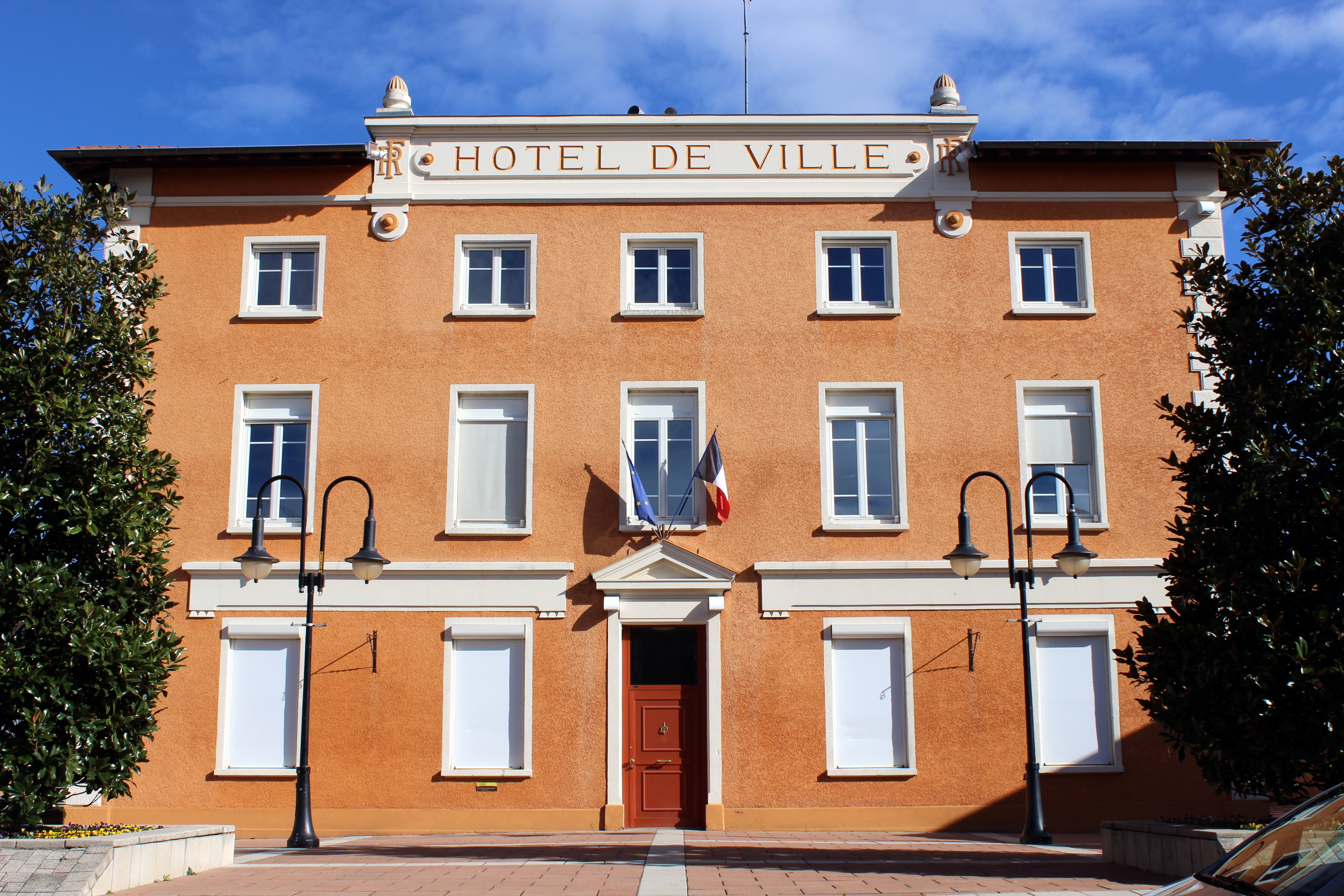
- The town hall of Saint-Quentin Fallavier

- Coat of arms
- Location of Saint-Quentin Fallavier
- Location within France Location within Auvergne-Rhône-Alpes
- Coordinates: 45°37′59″N 5°06′40″E
- Country: France
- Region: Auvergne-Rhône-Alpes
- Department: Isère
- Arrondissement: La Tour-du-Pin
- Canton: La Verpillière
- Intercommunality: CA Porte de l'Isère

Government
  - Mayor (2023–2026): Mathieu Gaget
- Area^{1}: 22.83 km^{2} (8.81 sq mi)
- Elevation: 234 m (768 ft)
- Highest elevation: 364 m (1,194 ft)
- Lowest elevation: 206 m (676 ft)
- Population (2023): 6,189
  - Density: 271.1/km^{2} (702.1/sq mi)
- Time zone: UTC+01:00 (CET)
  - Summer (DST): UTC+02:00 (CEST)
- INSEE/Postal code: 38449 /38070
- ^{1} French Land Register data, which excludes lakes, ponds, glaciers > 1 km^{2} (0.386 sq mi or 247 acres) and river estuaries.

Saint-Quentin-Fallavier is a commune in the Isère department, and the Auvergne-Rhône-Alpes region, in southeastern France.

== Geography ==
Saint-Quentin Fallavier is located in Isère, at the boundary of the department of Rhône, along the A43 of Lyon-Grenoble-Chambéry, respectively at 24 kilometres (15 mi) from Lyon and, 80 kilometres (50 mi) from Grenoble. The city is backed by a series of hills, the beginnings of the Prealps. Lyon–Saint-Exupéry Airport is 15 kilometres (9.3 mi) away. Saint-Quentin Fallavier was part of the new town of L'Isle d'Abeau transformed in 2007 into the Communauté d'agglomération Porte de l'Isère (CAPI).

The Bourbre river flows north through the northeastern part of the commune.

== History ==
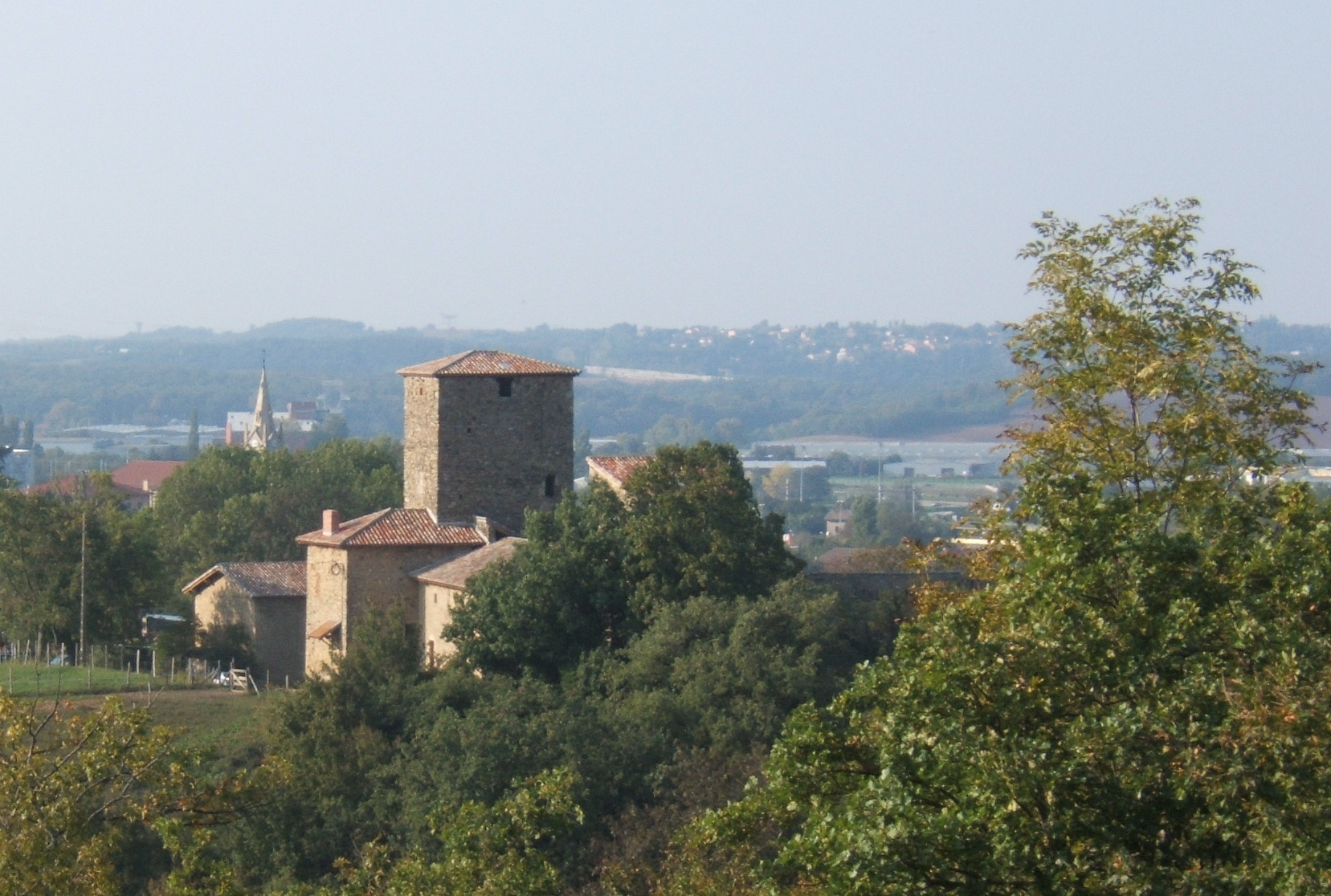
The fortified house of Allinges and, in the background left, the spire of the church of Saint-Quentin Fallavier

The site of Saint-Quentin-Fallavier has been occupied since prehistoric times. A Gallo-Roman necropolis and a hydraulic structure of the 2nd century were discovered on the spot. A first château already existed in the 13th century and, after acquiring it in 1250, the counts of Savoy enlarged and strengthened it. At the end of the border conflict between Savoy and Dauphiné, the castle was gradually abandoned in favour of the fortified house of Allinges.

Iron mines were exploited in the 19th century.

By a presidential decree of 2 July 1885, Fallavier was attached to Saint-Quentin to form a single commune: Saint-Quentin-Fallavier.

The creation of the new Lyon-Satolas Airport (now Lyon-Saint-Exupéry), and the birth of the new city, have allowed the creation of a sizeable European zone of activity, which is partly in the commune. The existence of Saint-Quentin-Fallavier is also favoured by the proximity of the Lyon conurbation.

=== 2015 Gas factory attack ===
On 26 June 2015, a man was found beheaded with Arabic inscriptions on the head. This was following an explosion at the Air Product gas factory in the area, after a man drove into the factory site and exploded gas canisters, in an attempt to blow up the building. It is seen as a terrorist attack linked with Islamic State.

== Heraldry ==
Arms of Saint-Quentin Fallavier	The arms of Saint-Quentin-Fallavier are blazoned : Five points of Or equipoles to four of azure, the chief point charged of twelve ordered ring stars, that of the flank dexter a Fleur-de-lis and of the flank sinister a dolphin, at the Tour de Fallavier on a mount issuing from base, brochant on the tip and partly on the cantons of tip and the heart, all also of Or, those minor nails argent in Saltire stitched over all.

== Politics and administration ==
=== List of mayors ===
In 2010, the commune of Saint-Quentin-Fallavier was awarded with the label "Ville Internet @@@".

List of mayors of Saint-Quentin-Fallavier from the French Revolution to the Liberation

List of mayors of Saint-Quentin-Fallavier from 1790 to 1944
Start	End	Name	Party	Other details
...				
...				
1799	1805	Jean-Chrisostome Bois		
1805	1808	Charreton		
1808	1832	Chollier		
1832	1848	Charreton		
1848	1848	Cumin		
1848	1852	Charuy		
1852	1853	Claude Charreton		
1853	1865	Charles Reverand		
1865	1870	Antoine Masson		
1870	1878	Jean-Baptiste Vacher		
1878	1884	Antoine Eparvier		
1884	1887	Charles Guerin		
1887	1888	Alfred Sadin		
1888	1896	Benoît Fournier		
1896	1896	Louis Gay		
1896	1899	Jean-François Bacconnier		
1900	1922	Joseph Geoffray		
1922	1929	Louis Guerin		
1929	1941	Charles Eparvier		
1941	1943	Rougier		
1944	1944	Charles Rose		

List of mayors since the Liberation
Start	End	Name	Party	Other details
1944	1944	François Girard		
1945	1945	Antonin Sage		
1946	March 1971	Sylvain Bacconnier		
March 1971	March 1977	Marcel Ribail		
March 1977	December 2023	Michel Bacconnier	PCF then DVG	
December 2023	In progress	Mathieu Gaget		

== Transport ==
The commune is served by:

- Train: TER Auvergne-Rhône-Alpes, Lyon - Bourgoin-Jallieu - Saint-André-le-Gaz at the Saint-Quentin-Fallavier station.
- Road: A43 (Lyon-Chambéry-Grenoble), D518.
- Coach: Transisere routes 1920 (Lyon - Bourgoin-Jallieu) and 1390.
- Bus: Ruban network of the CAPI route A (Saint-Quentin-Fallavier station - L'Isle-d'Abeau).

Passage through Saint-Quentin-Fallavier by a rail bypass of the Lyon agglomeration (CFAL) is still under consideration.

== Population ==
Historical population

Year	Pop.	±% p.a.
1793	1,006	—
1800	1,158	+2.03%
1806	1,213	+0.78%
1821	1,391	+0.92%
1831	1,506	+0.80%
1841	1,560	+0.35%
1846	1,615	+0.70%
1851	1,640	+0.31%
1856	1,592	−0.59%
1861	1,645	+0.66%
1866	1,665	+0.24%
1872	1,575	−0.92%
1876	1,544	−0.50%
1881	1,505	−0.51%
1886	1,465	−0.54%
1891	1,462	−0.04%
1896	1,467	+0.07%
1901	1,543	+1.02%

Year	Pop.	±% p.a.
1906	1,615	+0.92%
1911	1,566	−0.61%
1921	1,294	−1.89%
1926	1,345	+0.78%
1931	1,312	−0.50%
1936	1,210	−1.61%
1946	1,223	+0.11%
1954	1,373	+1.46%
1962	1,483	+0.97%
1968	1,860	+3.85%
1975	4,069	+11.83%
1982	4,321	+0.86%
1990	4,977	+1.78%
1999	5,841	+1.79%
2007	6,130	+0.61%
2012	5,932	−0.65%
2017	6,103	+0.57%
2023	6,189	+0.23%

From 1962 to 1999: Population without double counting; for the years following: municipal population.
Source: Ldh/EHESS/Cassini until 1999 then INSEE

== Local culture and heritage ==
=== Places and monuments ===
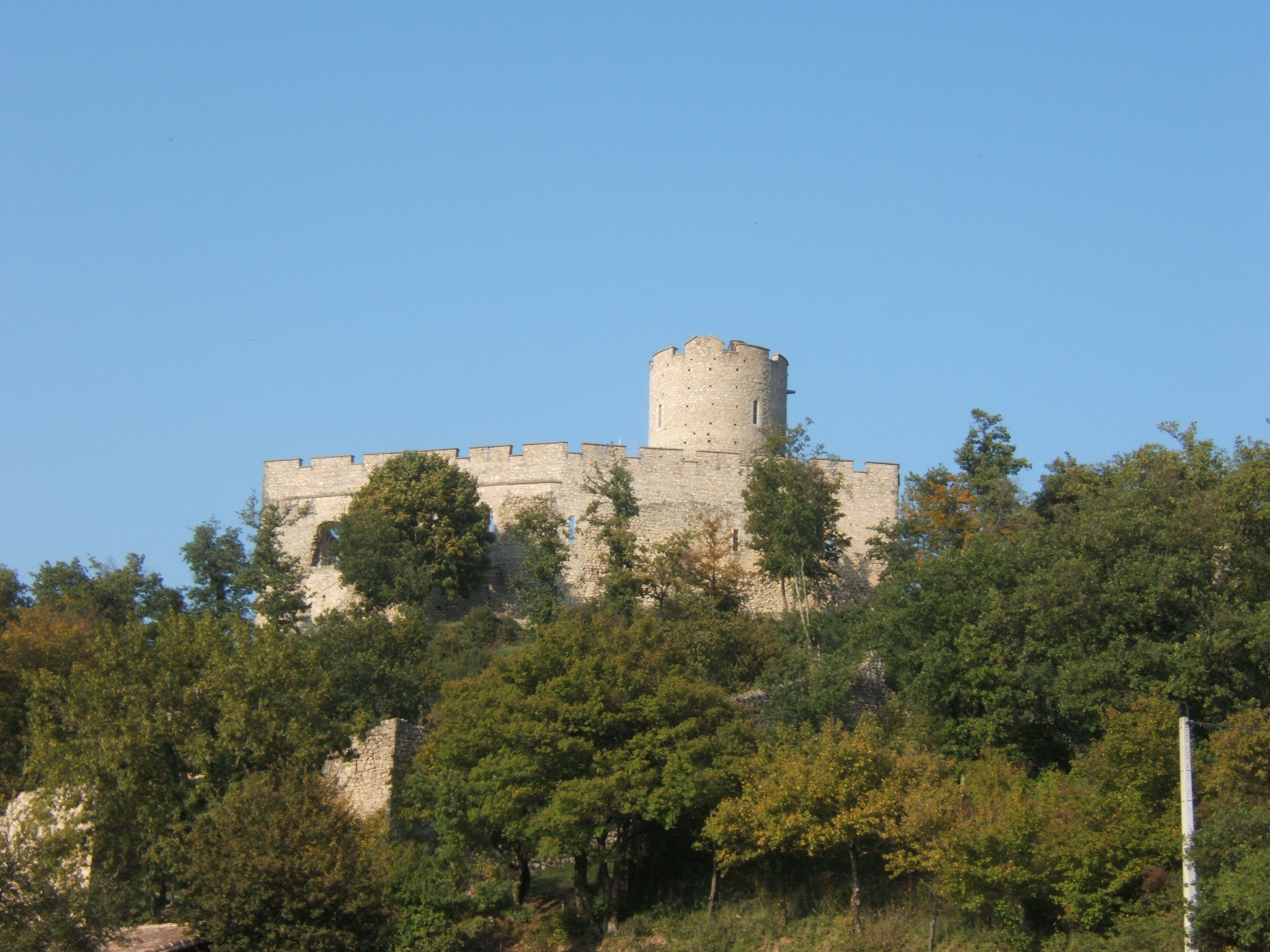
The château de Fallavier

The Natural Space of Saint-Quentin-Fallavier, a protected and classified area, encompasses:

- The Château de Fallavier (13th century) includes two enclosures and a circular keep. It offers an exceptional panoramic view. It is also the place where some episodes of the television series Kaamelott were shot during the scenes of the castle of books I-III.
- The Fortified House of Allinges (14th century), listed as an historic monument by decree of 27 July 2010.
- The hamlet of Fessy (traditional rural architecture, some parts date back to the Middle Ages).
- La Sarrazinière to Monthion. Its Roman vestiges were subject to a classification as an historic monument by order of 5 January 1950.
- Saint-Quentin-Fallavier and the Allinges lakes.
- Part of the marshes of the Bourbre.
- The Hill of the Relong, which houses the astronomy club, Sirius of Villefontaine (neighbouring).
- Site of the Relong, certified as Heritage in Isère.

=== Natural heritage ===
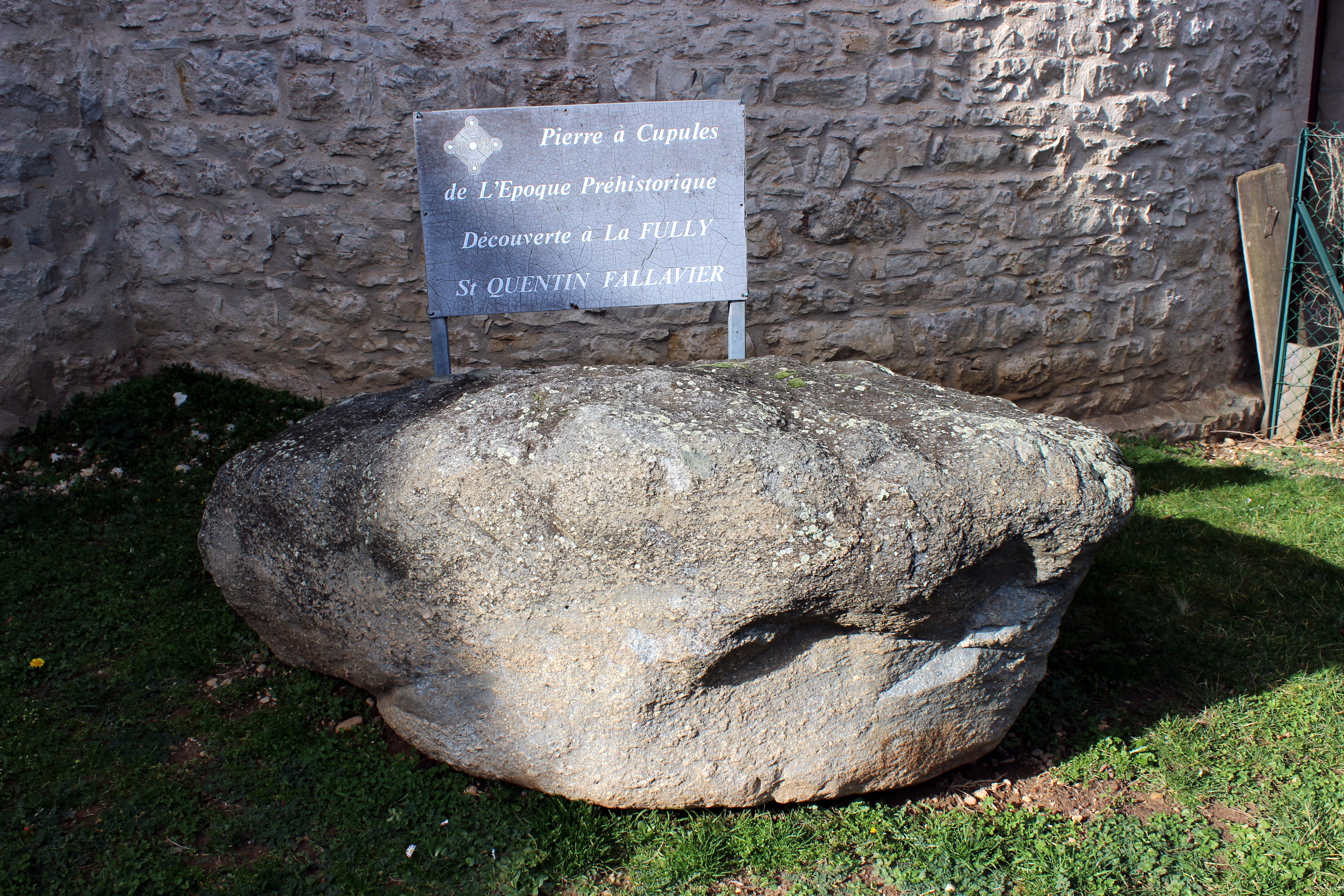
Stone with cupules of Saint-Quentin-Fallavier

- Stone with cupules of Saint-Quentin (Stone of the Valley of the Fuly). Moved. Lodged at the flank of the Church of St-Quentin-Fallavier. (45°37′57″N 5°06′42″E)

=== Cultural heritage ===
- Museum of rural life

=== Floral and green spaces ===
In 2014, the commune of Saint-Quentin-Fallavier has the label ville fleurie [floral city] with '1 flower' awarded by the National Council of cities and villages of France in the Floral contest of cities and villages.

== Education ==
The commune has six schools and one college:

- Marronniers kindergarten, Rue des Marronniers
- Marronniers primary school, Rue des Marronniers
- Tilleuls primary school, Rue du Lac
- Bellevue kindergarten, Rue du Loup
- Primary school in Des Moines, in the Des Moines quarter
- Françoise Dolto primary school (private), Rue Centrale
- Allinges college, Rue du Lac, offering a bilingual option: English/German.

== Economy ==
The industrial estate counts 283 businesses with a total of 11,200 employees. The main employer is the logistics sector; other sectors include mainly construction and other service activities.

=== Agriculture ===
The agricultural industry in the area is heavily focused on the cultivation of cereals (except rice), pulses and oilseeds. The region also produces cheese and wine.

=== Industry ===
The Thermador plumbing company, created after 1968, employs 257 staff and has a turnover of €194 million. The wage grid lies in the range of 1 to 10 and all salaries are open and discussed publicly.

Martinet SA company has located its headquarters in Saint-Quentin-Fallavier.

=== Service activities ===
Saint-Quentin-Fallavier has an industrial and logistics platform which is considered of international importance and which continues to grow, with traffic estimated at 5,000 HGVs per day and 1,500,000 square metres (16,000,000 sq ft) of warehouses in early 2007. Logistics activity benefits from the presence of the A43 interchange, proximity to Lyon–Saint-Exupéry Airport, and the Lyon-Grenoble Line of the SNCF. Branch lines are numerous, and a future extension to Italy and especially Turin is still relevant (Lyon-Turin Line).

The RueDuCommerce company has located its customer service returns depot in Saint-Quentin-Fallavier.

== International relations ==
The commune is twinned with:

- Freigericht, Germany, since 1971.
- Gallicano nel Lazio, Italy, since 2002.

== Personalities linked to the commune ==
French football player Jérémie Bréchet was trained at the OSQ football of Saint-Quentin-Fallavier.

The historian Pierre Arnaud did his primary studies at Saint-Quentin-Fallavier.

== See also ==
- Communes of the Isère department

== Bibliography ==
- Sirot, Élisabeth (2007). Noble et forte maison - L'habitat seigneurial dans les campagnes médiévales du milieu du XIIe au début du XVIe [Noble and fortified house - Seigneurial habitat in the medieval countryside from the middle of the 12th century to the beginning of the 16th century] (in French). Editions Picard. ISBN 9782708407701.
