= Bonnefamille =

- Commune
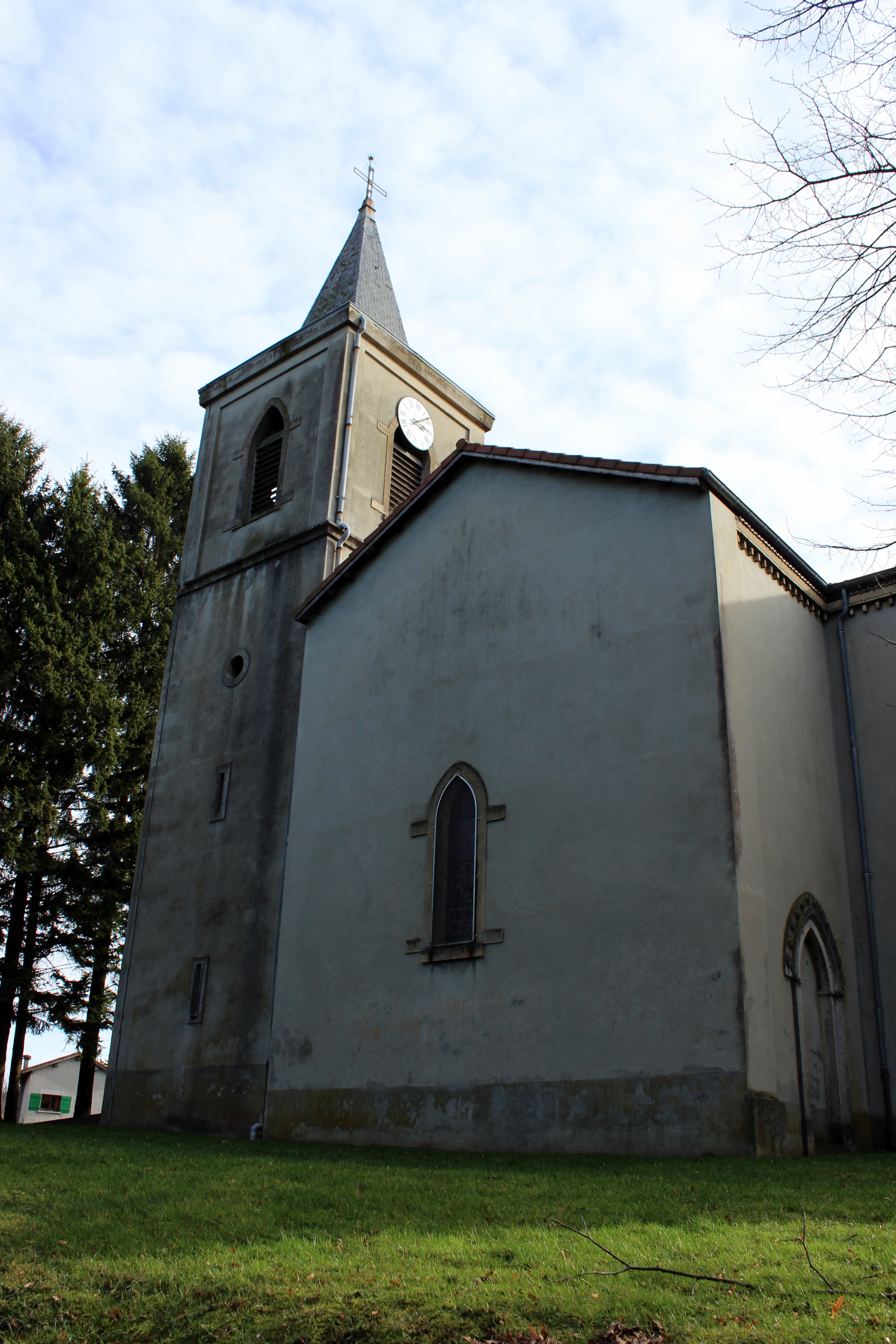
- The church of Bonnefamille

- Coat of arms
- Location of Bonnefamille
- Location within France Location within Auvergne-Rhône-Alpes
- Coordinates: 45°35′48″N 5°07′51″E
- Country: France
- Region: Auvergne-Rhône-Alpes
- Department: Isère
- Arrondissement: La Tour-du-Pin
- Canton: La Verpillière
- Intercommunality: Collines Isère Nord Communauté

Government
  - Mayor (2020–2026): André Quemin
- Area^{1}: 9.43 km^{2} (3.64 sq mi)
- Elevation: 300 m (980 ft)
- Highest elevation: 443 m (1,453 ft)
- Lowest elevation: 275 m (902 ft)
- Population (2023): 1,114
  - Density: 118/km^{2} (306/sq mi)
- Time zone: UTC+01:00 (CET)
  - Summer (DST): UTC+02:00 (CEST)
- INSEE/Postal code: 38048 /38090
- ^{1} French Land Register data, which excludes lakes, ponds, glaciers > 1 km^{2} (0.386 sq mi or 247 acres) and river estuaries.

Bonnefamille (French pronunciation: [bɔnfamij]) is a commune in the Isère department in southeastern France.

== Name ==
Before the French Revolution, the parish was called Menue-Famille. The name was changed by Charles X on 8 Jun 1825 to Bonne-Famille.

== Population ==
Historical population
| Year | Pop. | ±% p.a. |
|---|---|---|
| 1968 | 321 | — |
| 1975 | 409 | +3.52% |
| 1982 | 585 | +5.25% |
| 1990 | 787 | +3.78% |
| 1999 | 927 | +1.84% |
| 2007 | 1,035 | +1.39% |
| 2012 | 1,042 | +0.13% |
| 2017 | 1,096 | +1.02% |
| 2023 | 1,114 | +0.27% |
Source: INSEE

== Twin towns ==
Bonnefamille is twinned with:

- Glonn, Germany

== See also ==
- Communes of the Isère department
