= La Verpillière station =

French railway station

La Verpillière
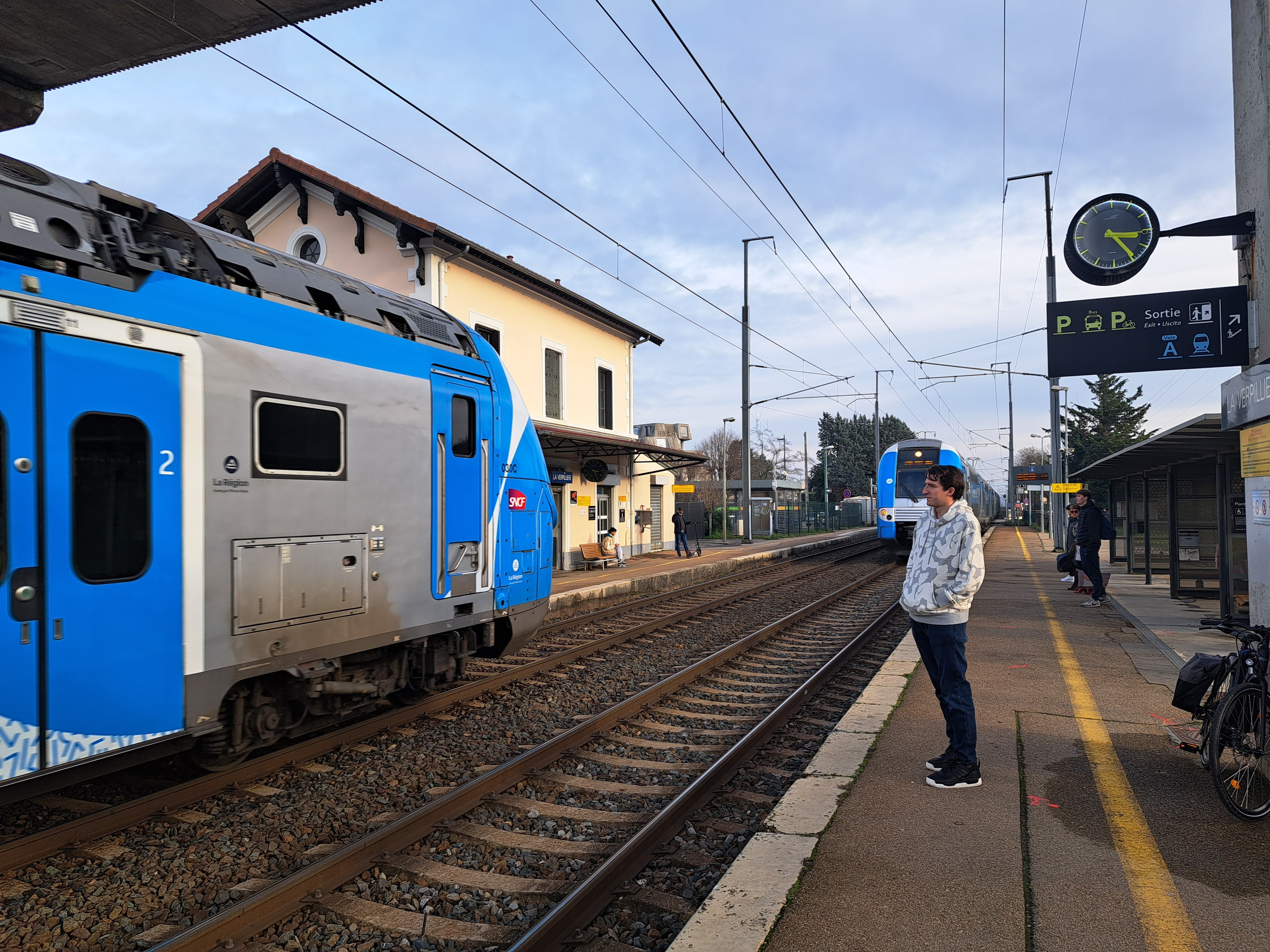
- Trains at La Verpillière station. A train towards Grenoble arrives at Platform A on the left, a train towards Lyon arrives at Platform B on the right

General information
- Location: La Verpillière, Isère, Auvergne-Rhône-Alpes, France
- Coordinates: 45°37′39″N 5°09′03″E
- Owner: SNCF
- Operator: SNCF
- Line: Lyon–Marseille (via Grenoble) railway
- Platforms: 2
- Tracks: 2
- Train operators: TER Auvergne-Rhône-Alpes

History
- Opened: 1 July 1858

Passengers
- 2024: 1,208,654
Location

La Verpillière station (French: Gare de La Verpillière) is a railway station located in the commune of La Verpillière in the department of Isère, France. La Verpillière is also the nearest railway stop for a bigger commune of Villefontaine located to the south-east. The station was opened in 1858 and is located on the Lyon–Marseille (via Grenoble) railway of TER Auvergne-Rhône-Alpes network in the French region of Auvergne-Rhône-Alpes. The train services are operated by SNCF.

The station has two side platforms connected by a pedestrian overpass. There are two parking lots near the station and a passenger drop-off area in front of the station building.

== Train services ==
The station is served by the following regional services, both on Route 1 of TER Auvergne-Rhône-Alpes:

- Services between Lyon-Perrache and Saint-André-le-Gaz, stopping at all stations
- Services between Lyon-Part-Dieu and Grenoble, having no stops between Lyon and La Verpillière and skipping several stops between La Verpillière and Grenoble.

Services on Route 54 between Lyon and Chambéry pass La Verpillière without stopping.

== History ==
The station was opened on July 1, 1858, by the “Comapgnie des chemins de fer du Dauphiné” (Dauphiné Railway Company), when the railway opened the section of its line from Lyon to Bourgoin, part of their concession to build a line from Lyon to Grenoble. The Dauphiné Railway merged with the Chemins de fer de Paris à Lyon et à la Méditerranée (PLM) on July 22, 1858. However, La Verpillière station only really became a part of the PLM network two years later; the merger agreement between both companies stipulated that the transaction would not come into force until after the rail line had been in operation for two years.

== See also ==
- List of SNCF stations in Auvergne-Rhône-Alpes

Preceding station	TER Auvergne-Rhône-Alpes	Following station
Saint-Quentin-Fallavier towards Lyon-Part-Dieu	1	L'Isle-d'Abeau towards Grenoble
