= Satolas-et-Bonce =

- Commune
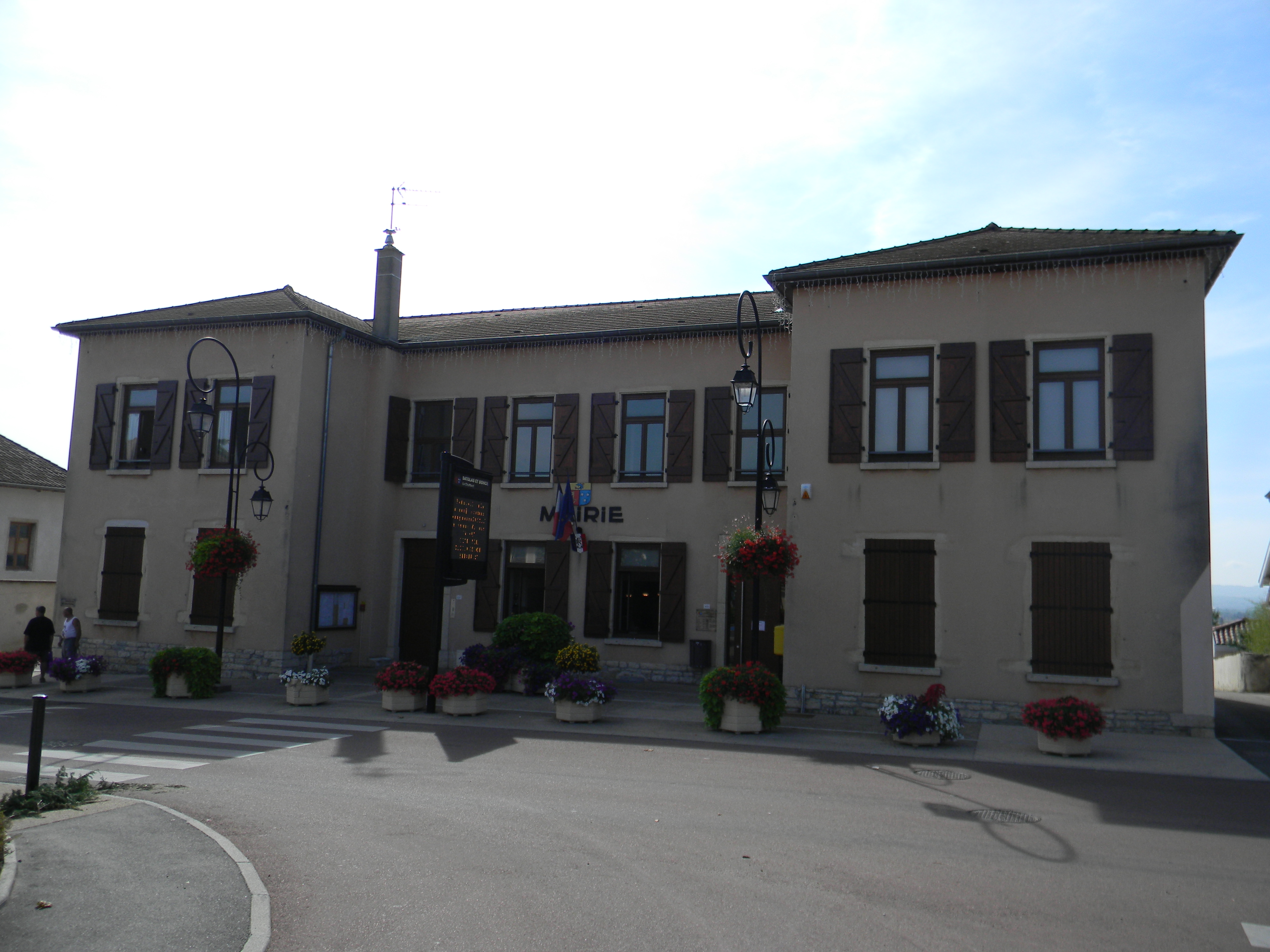
- Town hall

- Coat of arms
- Location of Satolas-et-Bonce
- Location within France Location within Auvergne-Rhône-Alpes
- Coordinates: 45°41′39″N 5°07′52″E
- Country: France
- Region: Auvergne-Rhône-Alpes
- Department: Isère
- Arrondissement: La Tour-du-Pin
- Canton: La Verpillière
- Intercommunality: CA Porte de l'Isère

Government
  - Mayor (2023–2026): Christine Sadin
- Area^{1}: 16.8 km^{2} (6.5 sq mi)
- Elevation: 253 m (830 ft)
- Highest elevation: 285 m (935 ft)
- Lowest elevation: 200 m (660 ft)
- Population (2023): 2,532
  - Density: 151/km^{2} (390/sq mi)
- Time zone: UTC+01:00 (CET)
  - Summer (DST): UTC+02:00 (CEST)
- INSEE/Postal code: 38475 /38290
- ^{1} French Land Register data, which excludes lakes, ponds, glaciers > 1 km^{2} (0.386 sq mi or 247 acres) and river estuaries.

Satolas-et-Bonce (French pronunciation: [satɔlas e bɔ̃s]) is a commune in the Isère department in southeastern France.

== Geography ==
The Bourbre forms most of the commune's eastern border. The commune is near Lyon–Saint-Exupéry Airport, which was formerly known as Lyon Satolas Airport.

== Population ==
Historical population

Year	Pop.	±% p.a.
1800	932	—
1821	1,082	+0.71%
1846	1,300	+0.74%
1872	1,191	−0.34%
1901	971	−0.70%
1926	776	−0.89%
1946	605	−1.24%
1962	677	+0.71%
1968	718	+0.98%

Year	Pop.	±% p.a.
1975	760	+0.82%
1982	880	+2.12%
1990	1,365	+5.64%
1999	1,651	+2.14%
2007	1,975	+2.27%
2012	2,212	+2.29%
2017	2,419	+1.81%
2023	2,532	+0.76%

Source: EHESS and INSEE (1968-2023)

== See also ==
- Communes of the Isère department
