= La Verpillière =

- Commune
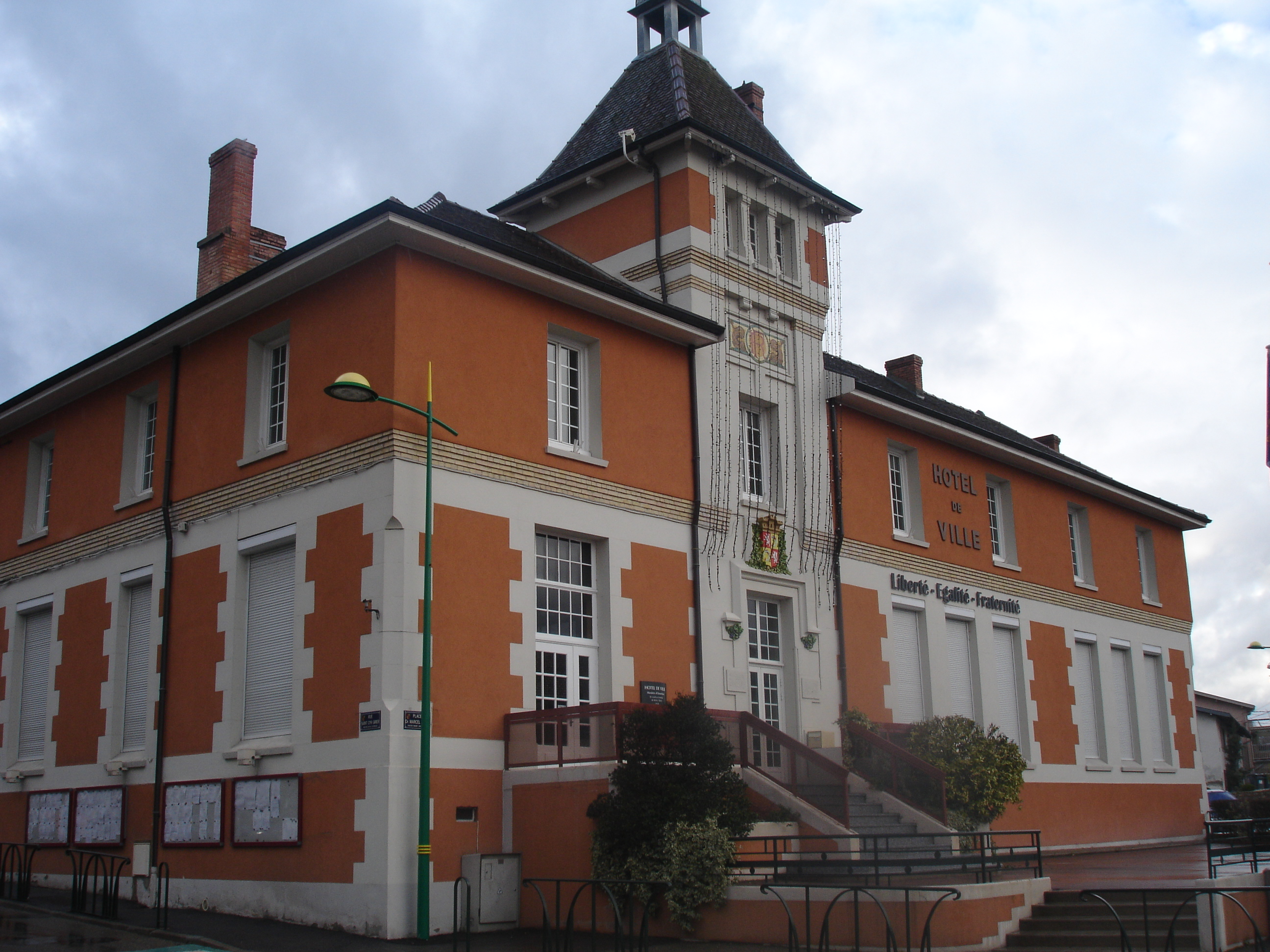
- Town hall

- Coat of arms
- Location of La Verpillière
- Location within France Location within Auvergne-Rhône-Alpes
- Coordinates: 45°38′16″N 5°08′37″E
- Country: France
- Region: Auvergne-Rhône-Alpes
- Department: Isère
- Arrondissement: La Tour-du-Pin
- Canton: La Verpillière
- Intercommunality: CA Porte de l'Isère

Government
  - Mayor (2020–2026): Patrick Margier
- Area^{1}: 6.64 km^{2} (2.56 sq mi)
- Highest elevation: 305 m (1,001 ft)
- Lowest elevation: 205 m (673 ft)
- Population (2023): 7,786
  - Density: 1,170/km^{2} (3,040/sq mi)
- Time zone: UTC+01:00 (CET)
  - Summer (DST): UTC+02:00 (CEST)
- INSEE/Postal code: 38537 /38290
- ^{1} French Land Register data, which excludes lakes, ponds, glaciers > 1 km^{2} (0.386 sq mi or 247 acres) and river estuaries.

La Verpillière (French pronunciation: [la vɛʁpijɛʁ]) is a commune in the Isère department in southeastern France.

La Verpillière railway station on the line between Lyon and Grenoble is located to the south-east of the town center.

== Geography ==
The Bourbre flows northwest through the northern part of the commune.

== Population ==
Historical population

Year	Pop.	±% p.a.
1793	559	—
1800	580	+0.53%
1806	647	+1.84%
1821	775	+1.21%
1831	1,062	+3.20%
1836	1,060	−0.04%
1841	1,186	+2.27%
1846	1,176	−0.17%
1851	1,220	+0.74%
1856	1,224	+0.07%
1861	1,229	+0.08%
1866	1,254	+0.40%
1872	1,243	−0.15%
1876	1,240	−0.06%
1881	1,210	−0.49%
1886	1,240	+0.49%
1891	1,215	−0.41%
1896	1,237	+0.36%
1901	1,328	+1.43%

Year	Pop.	±% p.a.
1906	1,271	−0.87%
1911	1,307	+0.56%
1921	1,424	+0.86%
1926	1,506	+1.13%
1931	1,523	+0.22%
1936	1,365	−2.17%
1946	1,381	+0.12%
1954	1,494	+0.99%
1962	1,795	+2.32%
1968	2,424	+5.13%
1975	3,285	+4.44%
1982	5,400	+7.36%
1990	5,595	+0.44%
1999	5,691	+0.19%
2007	6,018	+0.70%
2012	6,528	+1.64%
2017	7,226	+2.05%
2023	7,786	+1.25%

Source: EHESS and INSEE (1968-2023)

== See also ==
- Communes of the Isère department
