= Oytier-Saint-Oblas =

Oytier-Saint Oblas
- Commune
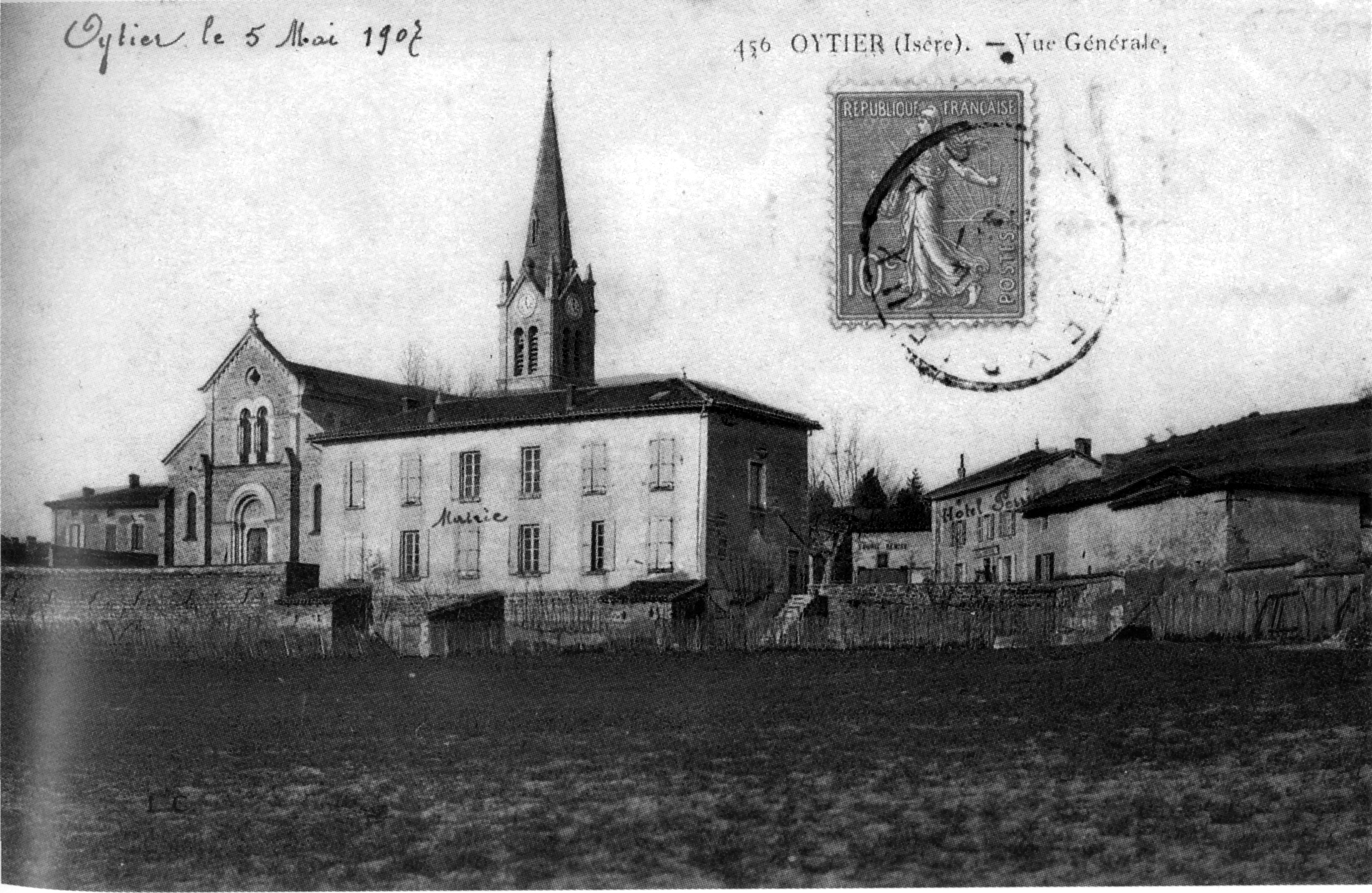
- Oytier in 1907

- Coat of arms
- Location of Oytier-Saint Oblas
- Location within France Location within Auvergne-Rhône-Alpes
- Coordinates: 45°33′42″N 5°01′18″E
- Country: France
- Region: Auvergne-Rhône-Alpes
- Department: Isère
- Arrondissement: Vienne
- Canton: La Verpillière
- Intercommunality: Collines Isère Nord Communauté

Government
  - Mayor (2020–2026): René Poretta
- Area^{1}: 14.3 km^{2} (5.5 sq mi)
- Elevation: 236 m (774 ft)
- Highest elevation: 376 m (1,234 ft)
- Lowest elevation: 232 m (761 ft)
- Population (2023): 1,743
  - Density: 122/km^{2} (316/sq mi)
- Time zone: UTC+01:00 (CET)
  - Summer (DST): UTC+02:00 (CEST)
- INSEE/Postal code: 38288 /38780
- ^{1} French Land Register data, which excludes lakes, ponds, glaciers > 1 km^{2} (0.386 sq mi or 247 acres) and river estuaries.

Oytier-Saint-Oblas is a commune in the Isère department in southeastern France.

== Population ==
Historical population
Year	Pop.	±% p.a.
1968	550	—
1975	558	+0.21%
1982	686	+2.99%
1990	1,022	+5.11%
1999	1,353	+3.17%
2007	1,514	+1.42%
2012	1,615	+1.30%
2017	1,637	+0.27%
2023	1,743	+1.05%
Source: INSEE

== See also ==
- Communes of the Isère department
