= Valencin =

- Commune
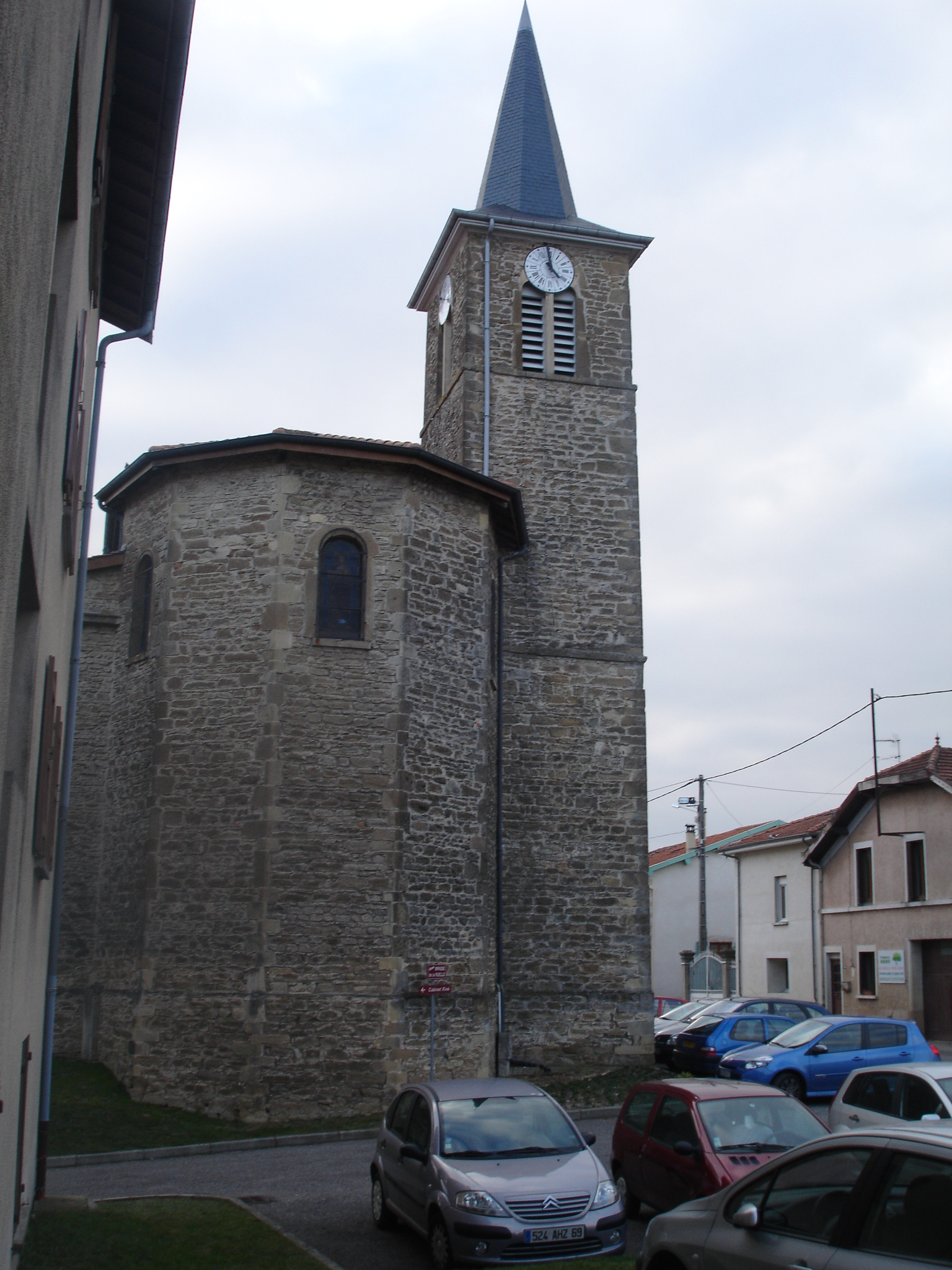
- The church of Valencin

- Coat of arms
- Location of Valencin
- Location within France Location within Auvergne-Rhône-Alpes
- Coordinates: 45°36′46″N 5°00′56″E
- Country: France
- Region: Auvergne-Rhône-Alpes
- Department: Isère
- Arrondissement: Vienne
- Canton: La Verpillière
- Intercommunality: Collines Isère Nord Communauté

Government
  - Mayor (2020–2026): Bernard Jullien
- Area^{1}: 9.63 km^{2} (3.72 sq mi)
- Elevation: 360 m (1,180 ft)
- Highest elevation: 379 m (1,243 ft)
- Lowest elevation: 270 m (890 ft)
- Population (2023): 2,878
  - Density: 299/km^{2} (774/sq mi)
- Time zone: UTC+01:00 (CET)
  - Summer (DST): UTC+02:00 (CEST)
- INSEE/Postal code: 38519 /38540
- ^{1} French Land Register data, which excludes lakes, ponds, glaciers > 1 km^{2} (0.386 sq mi or 247 acres) and river estuaries.

Valencin (French pronunciation: [valɑ̃sɛ̃]) is a commune in the Isère department in southeastern France.

== Population ==
Historical population

Year	Pop.	±% p.a.
1793	595	—
1806	573	−0.29%
1821	721	+1.54%
1831	749	+0.38%
1841	810	+0.79%
1851	814	+0.05%
1861	774	−0.50%
1872	757	−0.20%
1881	644	−1.78%
1891	630	−0.22%
1901	648	+0.28%
1911	651	+0.05%
1921	588	−1.01%

Year	Pop.	±% p.a.
1931	578	−0.17%
1946	549	−0.34%
1954	575	+0.58%
1962	602	+0.58%
1968	575	−0.76%
1975	721	+3.29%
1982	972	+4.36%
1990	1,763	+7.73%
1999	2,073	+1.82%
2007	2,405	+1.87%
2012	2,628	+1.79%
2017	2,799	+1.27%
2023	2,878	+0.46%

Source: EHESS and INSEE

== See also ==
- Communes of the Isère department
