= Canton of La Verpillière =

Coordinates: 45.63°N 5.15°E

The canton of La Verpillière is an administrative division of the Isère department, eastern France. Its borders were modified at the French canton reorganisation which came into effect in March 2015. Its seat is in La Verpillière.

It consists of the following communes:

1. Artas
2. Bonnefamille
3. Chamagnieu
4. Charantonnay
5. Diémoz
6. Frontonas
7. Grenay
8. Heyrieux
9. Oytier-Saint-Oblas
10. Roche
11. Saint-Georges-d'Espéranche
12. Saint-Just-Chaleyssin
13. Saint-Quentin-Fallavier
14. Satolas-et-Bonce
15. Valencin
16. La Verpillière
