= Château de Fallavier =

Castle in Isère, France

Coordinates: 45°37′40″N 5°7′21″E

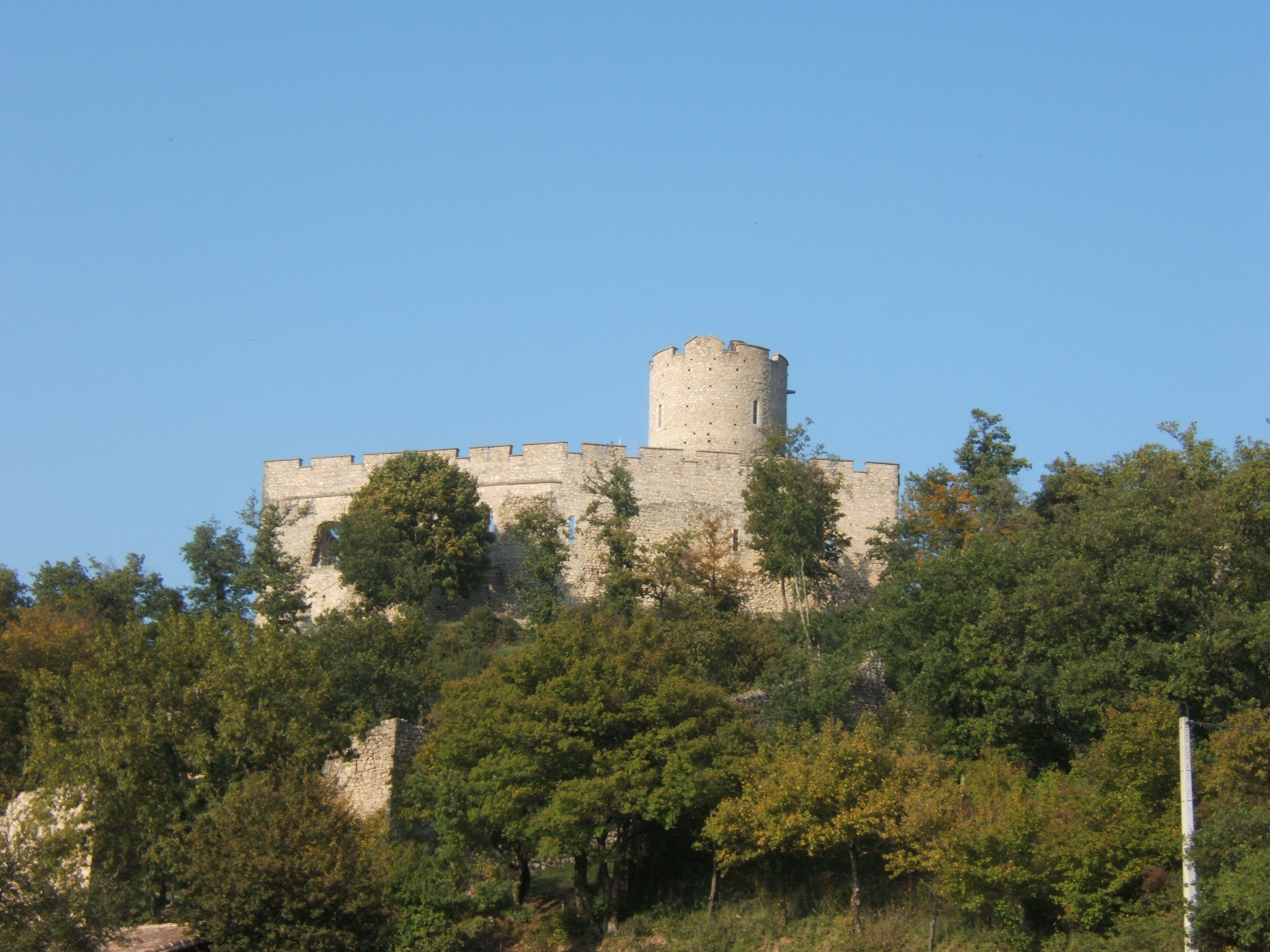
The Château de Fallavier (southern side)

The Château de Fallavier is a castle in the Isère département of France.

== History ==
The castle dates back at least to 1250. It was enlarged and reinforced in the 13th century by the counts of Savoy, but was gradually forsaken and lay in ruins by the 17th century. Since 1970, under the direction of its last owner Gabriel Mérard, a group of volunteers have worked to restore the castle. Since 1992, the castle has belonged to the commune of Saint-Quentin-Fallavier.

== Architecture ==
The castle is built on the hill of Relong (altitude: 344 m) and dominates the scenery. A ditch (no longer present) and the outer enclosing wall (relatively well-preserved) delimit an area of 15,000 square metres. A second enclosure surrounds the buildings of the castle itself, placed against the northern wall of the outer enclosure. The circular keep of 32 metres (only 25 metres survive to the present day) is placed in an angle to the east of the inner enclosure, and is isolated from the castle itself by a wall. A narrow staircase is dug in the wall of the keep in order to reach the top, from where one obtains a panoramic view of surrounding country. The ruined buildings around the castle are still impressive: of particular note are the chapel windows on the northern side.

== See also ==
- List of castles in France
