= Saint-Just-Chaleyssin =

- Commune
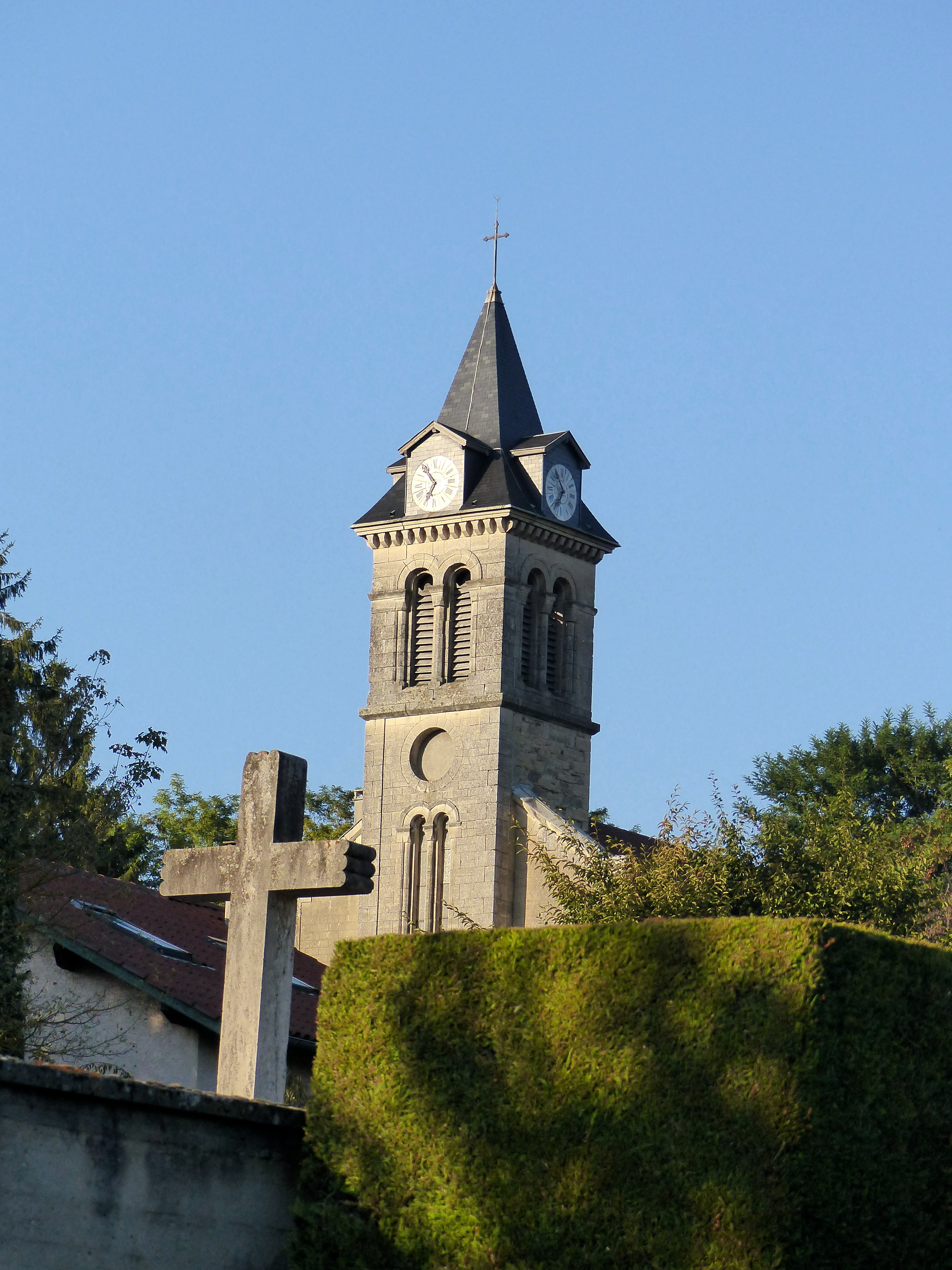
- The church of Saint-Pierre

- Coat of arms
- Location of Saint-Just-Chaleyssin
- Location within France Location within Auvergne-Rhône-Alpes
- Coordinates: 45°35′09″N 5°00′00″E
- Country: France
- Region: Auvergne-Rhône-Alpes
- Department: Isère
- Arrondissement: Vienne
- Canton: La Verpillière
- Intercommunality: Collines Isère Nord Communauté

Government
  - Mayor (2020–2026): Isabelle Hugou
- Area^{1}: 13.95 km^{2} (5.39 sq mi)
- Elevation: 250 m (820 ft)
- Highest elevation: 373 m (1,224 ft)
- Lowest elevation: 218 m (715 ft)
- Population (2023): 2,695
  - Density: 193.2/km^{2} (500.4/sq mi)
- Time zone: UTC+01:00 (CET)
  - Summer (DST): UTC+02:00 (CEST)
- INSEE/Postal code: 38408 /385.0
- ^{1} French Land Register data, which excludes lakes, ponds, glaciers > 1 km^{2} (0.386 sq mi or 247 acres) and river estuaries.

Saint-Just-Chaleyssin (French pronunciation: [sɛ̃ ʒɥ(st) ʃalesɛ̃]) is a commune in the Isère department in southeastern France. The main village is situated 16 km northeast of Vienne and 25 km south of Lyon.

== Population ==
Historical population

Year	Pop.	±% p.a.
1793	544	—
1821	770	+1.25%
1846	982	+0.98%
1872	867	−0.48%
1901	664	−0.92%
1926	591	−0.46%
1946	537	−0.48%
1962	559	+0.25%
1968	658	+2.75%

Year	Pop.	±% p.a.
1975	876	+4.17%
1982	1,527	+8.26%
1990	1,848	+2.41%
1999	2,242	+2.17%
2007	2,426	+0.99%
2012	2,437	+0.09%
2017	2,568	+1.05%
2023	2,695	+0.81%

Source: EHESS and INSEE (1968-2023)

== International relations ==
Saint-Just-Chaleyssin is twinned with:

- Incisa Scapaccino, Italy (1972)

== See also ==
- Communes of the Isère department
