= Charantonnay =

- Commune
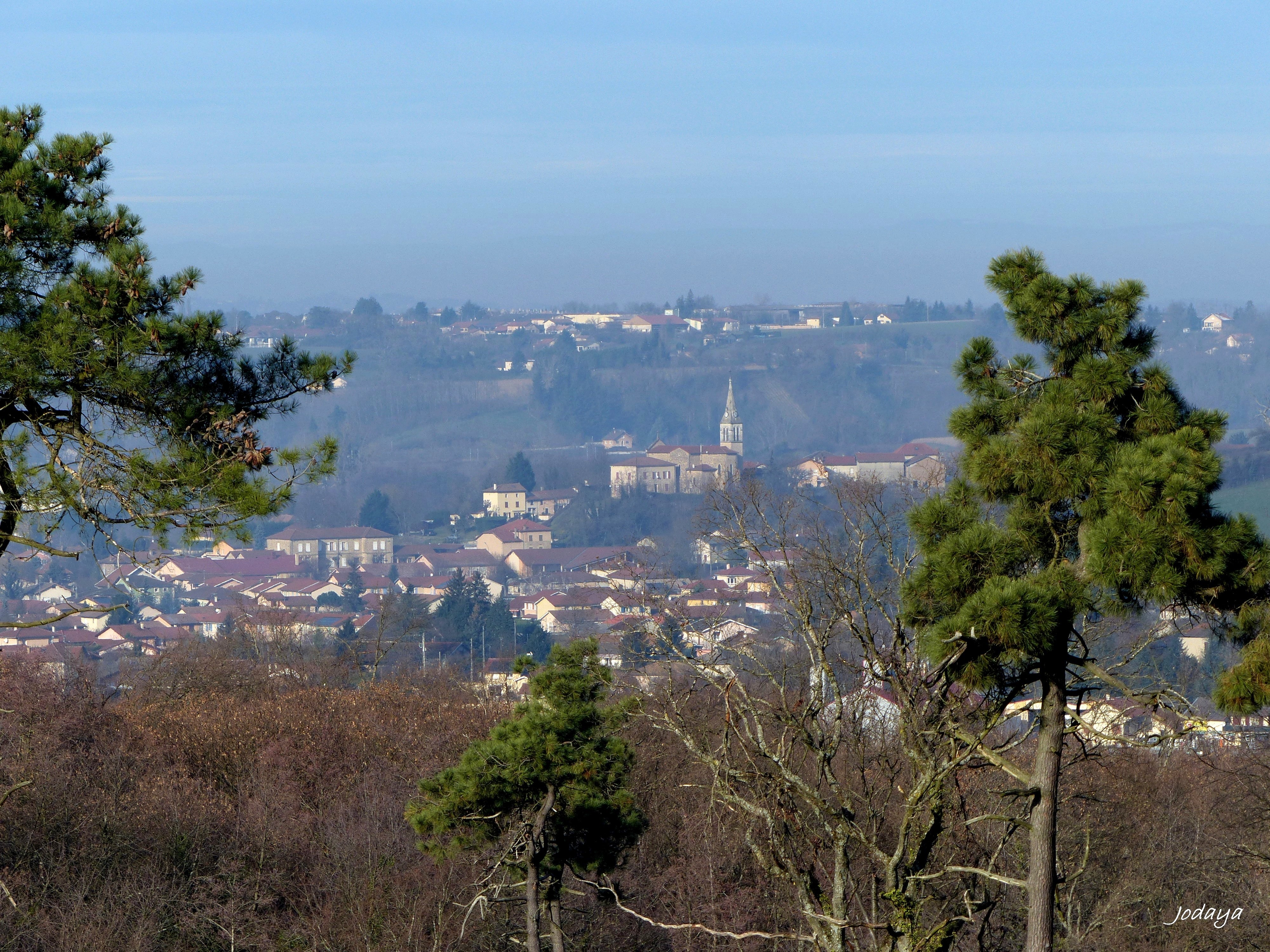
- A general view of Charantonnay

- Coat of arms
- Location of Charantonnay
- Location within France Location within Auvergne-Rhône-Alpes
- Coordinates: 45°32′15″N 5°06′32″E
- Country: France
- Region: Auvergne-Rhône-Alpes
- Department: Isère
- Arrondissement: Vienne
- Canton: La Verpillière
- Intercommunality: Collines Isère Nord Communauté

Government
  - Mayor (2020–2026): Pierre-Louis Orelle
- Area^{1}: 11 km^{2} (4.2 sq mi)
- Highest elevation: 472 m (1,549 ft)
- Lowest elevation: 337 m (1,106 ft)
- Population (2023): 2,019
  - Density: 180/km^{2} (480/sq mi)
- Time zone: UTC+01:00 (CET)
  - Summer (DST): UTC+02:00 (CEST)
- INSEE/Postal code: 38081 /38790
- ^{1} French Land Register data, which excludes lakes, ponds, glaciers > 1 km^{2} (0.386 sq mi or 247 acres) and river estuaries.

Charantonnay (French pronunciation: [ʃaʁɑ̃tɔnɛ]) is a commune in the Isère department in southeastern France.

== Population ==
Historical population
Year	Pop.	±% p.a.
1968	447	—
1975	557	+3.19%
1982	881	+6.77%
1990	1,411	+6.06%
1999	1,555	+1.09%
2007	1,866	+2.31%
2012	1,870	+0.04%
2017	1,911	+0.43%
2023	2,019	+0.92%
Source: INSEE

== See also ==
- Communes of the Isère department
