= Grenay, Isère =

Grenay
- Commune
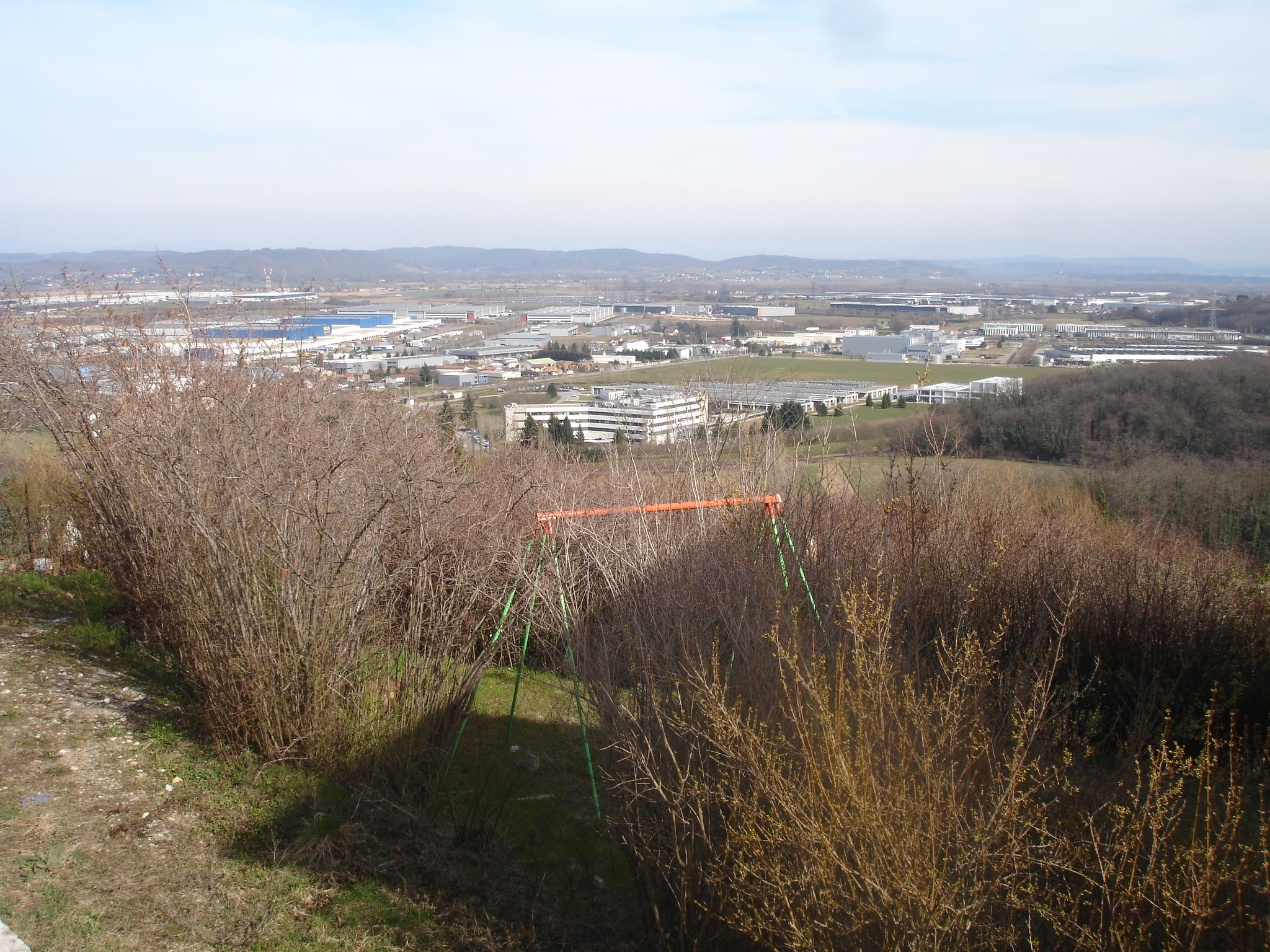
- A general view of Grenay

- Coat of arms
- Location of Grenay
- Location within France Location within Auvergne-Rhône-Alpes
- Coordinates: 45°39′55″N 5°04′49″E
- Country: France
- Region: Auvergne-Rhône-Alpes
- Department: Isère
- Arrondissement: Vienne
- Canton: La Verpillière
- Intercommunality: Collines Isère Nord Communauté

Government
  - Mayor (2020–2026): Alain Cauquil
- Area^{1}: 7.2 km^{2} (2.8 sq mi)
- Elevation: 310 m (1,020 ft)
- Highest elevation: 321 m (1,053 ft)
- Lowest elevation: 220 m (720 ft)
- Population (2023): 1,628
  - Density: 230/km^{2} (590/sq mi)
- Time zone: UTC+01:00 (CET)
  - Summer (DST): UTC+02:00 (CEST)
- INSEE/Postal code: 38184 /38540
- ^{1} French Land Register data, which excludes lakes, ponds, glaciers > 1 km^{2} (0.386 sq mi or 247 acres) and river estuaries.

Grenay (French pronunciation: [gʁənɛ]) is a commune in the Isère department in southeastern France.

== Population ==
Historical population
Year	Pop.	±% p.a.
1968	490	—
1975	514	+0.69%
1982	715	+4.83%
1990	1,016	+4.49%
1999	1,196	+1.83%
2007	1,419	+2.16%
2012	1,530	+1.52%
2017	1,606	+0.97%
2023	1,628	+0.23%
Source: INSEE

== See also ==
- Communes of the Isère department
