= Roche, Isère =

Roche
- Commune
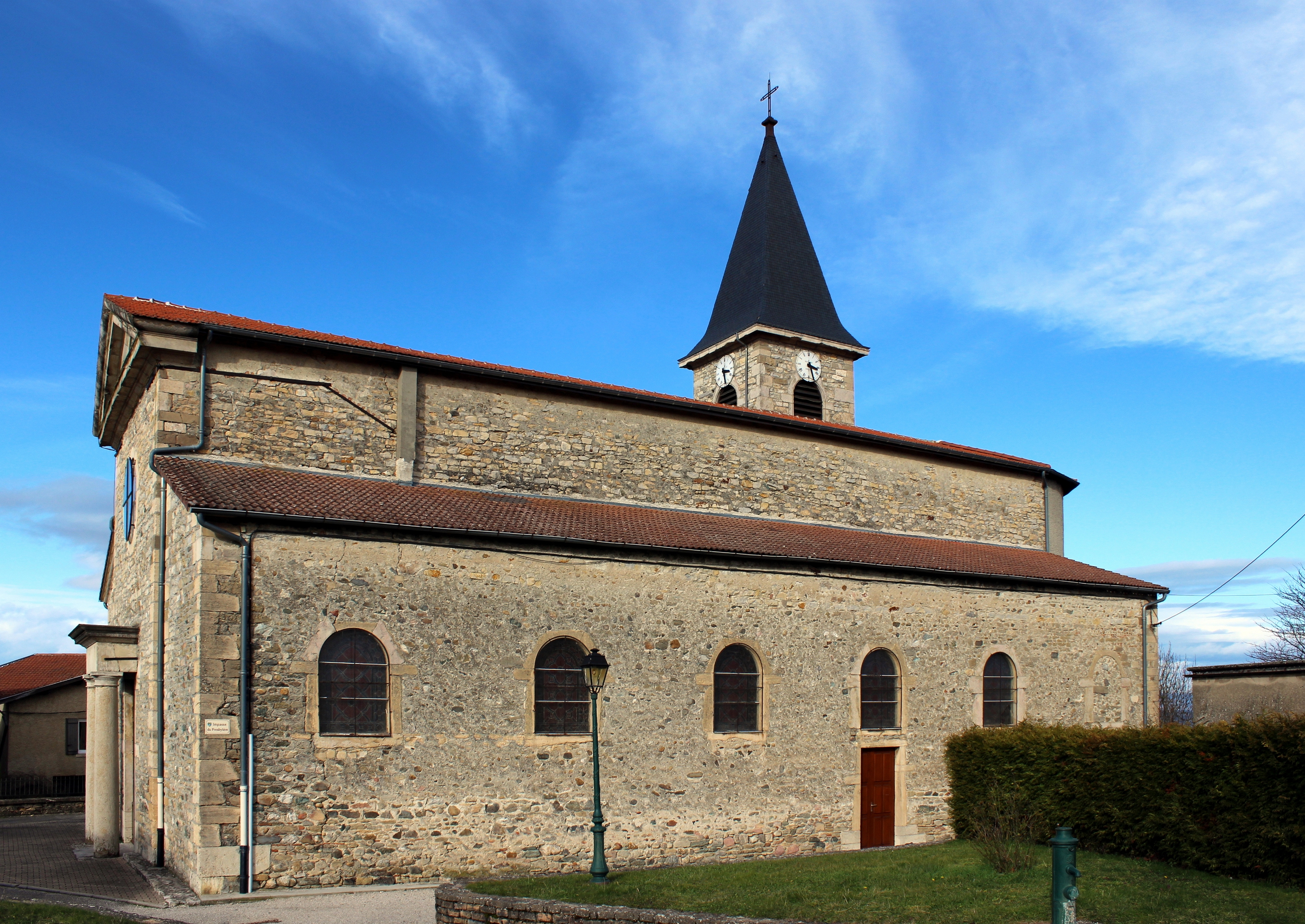
- The church of Roche

- Coat of arms
- Location of Roche
- Location within France Location within Auvergne-Rhône-Alpes
- Coordinates: 45°35′23″N 5°09′37″E
- Country: France
- Region: Auvergne-Rhône-Alpes
- Department: Isère
- Arrondissement: La Tour-du-Pin
- Canton: La Verpillière
- Intercommunality: Collines Isère Nord Communauté

Government
  - Mayor (2020–2026): Bernard Cochard
- Area^{1}: 21.04 km^{2} (8.12 sq mi)
- Elevation: 230 m (750 ft)
- Highest elevation: 516 m (1,693 ft)
- Lowest elevation: 267 m (876 ft)
- Population (2023): 2,196
  - Density: 104.4/km^{2} (270.3/sq mi)
- Time zone: UTC+01:00 (CET)
  - Summer (DST): UTC+02:00 (CEST)
- INSEE/Postal code: 38339 /38090
- ^{1} French Land Register data, which excludes lakes, ponds, glaciers > 1 km^{2} (0.386 sq mi or 247 acres) and river estuaries.

Roche (French pronunciation: [ʁɔʃ]) is a commune in the Isère department in southeastern France.

== Population ==
Historical population

Year	Pop.	±% p.a.
1793	983	—
1800	1,095	+1.55%
1806	1,179	+1.24%
1821	1,411	+1.20%
1831	1,487	+0.53%
1836	1,513	+0.35%
1841	1,603	+1.16%
1846	1,590	−0.16%
1851	1,576	−0.18%
1856	1,490	−1.12%
1861	1,448	−0.57%
1866	1,453	+0.07%
1872	1,454	+0.01%
1876	1,424	−0.52%
1881	1,390	−0.48%
1886	1,390	+0.00%
1891	1,304	−1.27%
1896	1,261	−0.67%
1901	1,208	−0.86%

Year	Pop.	±% p.a.
1906	1,182	−0.43%
1911	1,173	−0.15%
1921	1,025	−1.34%
1926	995	−0.59%
1931	961	−0.69%
1936	921	−0.85%
1946	922	+0.01%
1954	857	−0.91%
1962	862	+0.07%
1968	866	+0.08%
1975	875	+0.15%
1982	1,028	+2.33%
1990	1,243	+2.40%
1999	1,548	+2.47%
2007	1,812	+1.99%
2012	1,896	+0.91%
2017	2,083	+1.90%
2023	2,196	+0.88%

Source: EHESS and INSEE (1968-2023)

== See also ==
- Communes of the Isère department
