= Inca aqueducts =

Aqueducts built by the Inca people

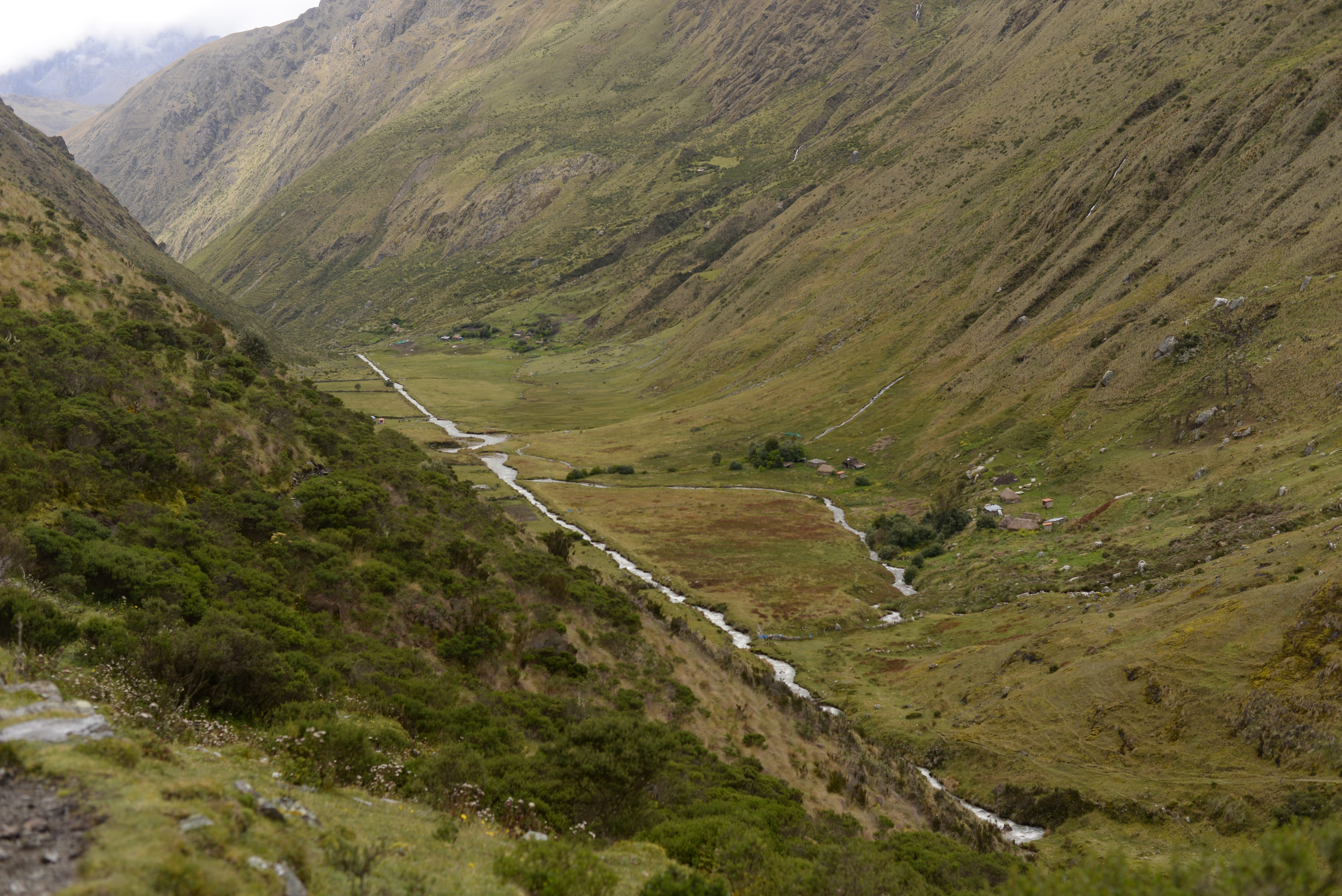
An Inca canal running through the Pampacahuana valley near Salcantay.

The Inca aqueducts refer to any of a series of aqueducts built by the Inca people. The Inca built such structures to increase arable land and provide drinking water and baths to the population. Due to water scarcity in the Andean region, advanced water management was necessary for the Inca to thrive and expand along much of the coast of Peru. Such structures, some of which survive today, show the advanced hydraulic and civil engineering capabilities of the Inca.

The water came mostly from nearby rivers but was also brought down from freshwater springs on mountains. The ancients discovered that if they diverted certain amounts of water from rivers, then they didn't have to worry about scarce rain and drought and they could also stimulate plants to grow faster by getting enough water in time. Workers dug tunnels through mountains and cut channels into cliffs to complete the project.

In seasons when too much mountain snow melted, the floodwaters were carried to huge masonry reservoirs for storage, channeling water to their cities and religious centers. Not only was water a geographical resource, water was also considered with great value seeing it as life. Religion and water were very connected to the Inca, in lake Titicaca it was considered a sacred body of water because it's believed to be the birthplace of humanity.

== Early accounts ==
The first recorded accounts of Inca water transportation structures came from Spanish conquistadores in the sixteenth century. One such explorer was Pedro Cieza de León. In his published chronicles detailing his travels through Peru, he noted seeing a large wall as he headed east from Cuzco, which scholars argue he was referring to the aqueduct at the Piquillacta archaeological site. Cieza writes:

"Along this road there is a very large, broad wall, along the top of which, according to the natives, ran pipes of water, laboriously brought from some river and piped in with the forethought and care they used in building their irrigation ditches."

Noted American archeologist Ephraim George Squier noted several aqueducts during his exploration of Peru in the late 1800s, including those that watered gardens on the terraces of the Yucay or Sacred Valley, north of Cuzco. He also recorded an account of the ruins of a sixty-foot-high aqueduct in the foothills of the Andes near Lima.

== Machu Picchu ==
Machu Picchu, the most famous and well preserved of Inca archeological sites, contains a complex aqueduct system. Construction of Machu Picchu began as an estate for nobility around the mid-1400s under Emperor Pachacuti. Inca engineers in Machu Picchu were able to use an ingenious stone collection system to increase the yield of the perennial spring that normally only had substantial flows as mountain snow melted in the warmer months. Without this innovation, the population of Machu Picchu would have been unsustainable. While the area received enough rainfall for agricultural production, there were few freshwater sources for domestic use. Water had to travel 749 m (about half of a mile) to reach the city center. The Inca exhibited a large degree of technological prowess in their careful gradation of the aqueducts. By cutting the canals out of one stone, lining canals with rock, and filling joints with clay, the Inca were able to reduce water loss due to seepage.

The water from this stream provided water for sixteen fountains, lending an additional visual and auditory aspect to life in Machu Picchu. Those fountains served as water sources for those houses not directly provided with water from the canals, but also were places of worship and ceremony. Those fountains are notable because they suggest that the flow of water was integrated into the city's planning at a very early stage, which demonstrated that the Inca had a very advanced concept of city planning and resource management.

== Moray ==
Moray is an archeological site approximately halfway between Cuzco and Machu Picchu. The site is noted for its three unusual depressions of concentric terraced circles. Vertical channels drop water from one level of the terrace to the next, creating a beautiful waterfall-like effect. Unlike Machu Picchu, Moray did not receive enough rain to sustain agriculture. Therefore, aqueducts were required for transporting water from the three surrounding springs. Reservoirs supplemented those aqueducts, which allowed for a steady flow of water despite the variable yields of the springs.

== Tipón ==
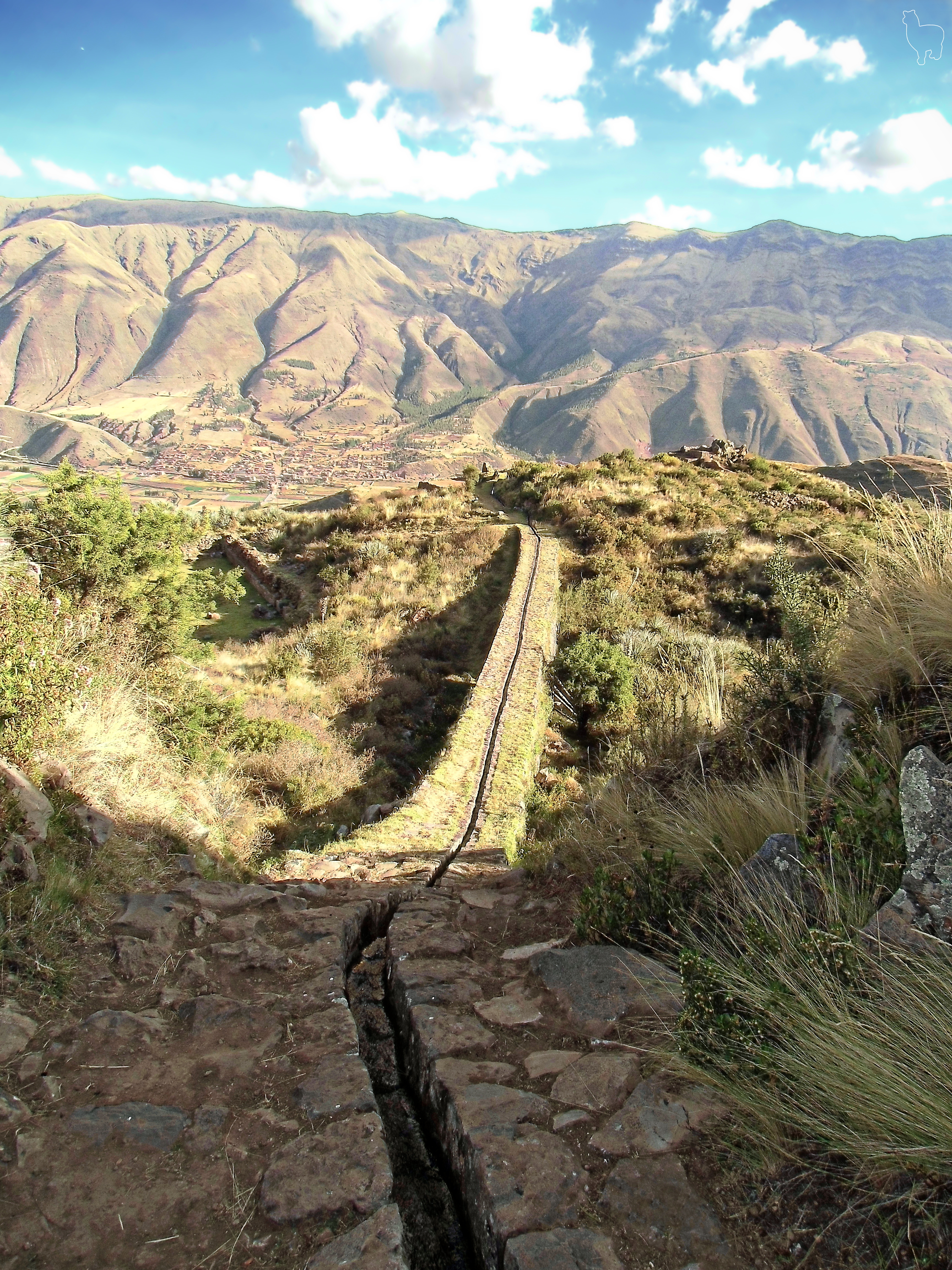
Inca aqueduct at Tipón in Cusco, Peru

Aqueducts can also be found at the archeological site at Tipón. Located thirteen miles east of Cuzco in the Cuzco Valley, this ensemble of ruins was once an estate for the Inca elite and nobility. The aqueducts of this area are set atop walls that predate the Inca occupation of the area. Scholars believe these walls too have been built by the Wari civilization. After the Inca took control of Tipón in 1400CE, Emperor Vircocha sent engineers to survey the site. Those engineers reinforced the existing Wari wall by using andesite and the characteristic Inca technique of mortarless masonry. They also improved the three existing canals. The Inca then created a trough on the top of the wall, which moved water from surface and ground sources to a nearby ravine, transferring over a thousand cubic meters of water. The ravine was then used for irrigation. The use of both ground and surface water, referred to as conjunctive use, is further evidence of the prudent use of the Inca's scarce resources.

This engineering marvel required complex topographical surveying and analysis, not unlike what would be done in a modern building project. This project depended on the labor of the Inca citizenry, though no peasant builders would reside within the complex. The central Inca government levied no taxes on its people, except for labor requirements on construction projects, giving the Inca the human capital to back up their engineering expertise.

The aesthetic qualities of the Tipón channel system were striking. While the principal purpose of the canals was to provide the estate with water and sustain agriculture, Inca engineers also took into account how the water would look flowing through Tipón's many terraces. Waterfalls and drops are accompanied by fountains, which may have also held a ceremonial function.

== Pisac ==
Also located near Cuzco, around 25km northeast is the Inca royal estate of Pisac. There are mass burials situated in the cliffs alongside Pisac, leading experts to believe that the land was considered sacred before Inca improvements were placed there. Inca emperor Pachacuti is attributed as the constructor of the estate which is divided into four sectors, all connected through elaborate waterways. The water features at Pisac originate from a spring that diverges into two canals which feed the many baths and fountains inhabiting the estate. These aquatic features accentuate the sacred stone huacas, emphasizing the moving water and animating these huacas to show dominance over the indigenous people and express ritual purification. This relationship consisting of the water, huacas, and ancestry is a theme found at many Inca sites associated with Pachacuti.

== Pumpu ==
The provincial site of Pumpu which served as an administrative center for Chinchaycocha (Lake Junin), the largest lake that fully inhabits Peru, holds three water features. Both an Inca bath and a water holding tank are connected via an open 1 km long canal that runs through the main plaza in the center. The bath is small and located in a housing compound. To the west is the holding tank, a rectangular reservoir that is 1 meter deep. All water features seem to be exclusive to the housing district that was reserved for elite members of the location.

== Huánaco Pampa ==
Another Inca provincial site, Huánaco Pampa was a large settlement centered around a large plaza. On the east side, there are baths similar to Pumpu. However, Huánaco Pampa also features a pool. A series of open and covered canals and channels feed the baths that reached (4 x 5 x 1 m deep) and pool (17 x 19m), between these features are large walled-depressions that reached (65 x 35 m). Some of the fine masonries of the area are shown in the water's access points; trapezoid-shaped openings, steps, and niched walls decorate the elaborate hydraulic system. The pool, which some have assessed to be a sunken garden, is filled by the draining of a nearby spring. The abundant water divided the estimated 3,500 building site built by Topa Inca Yupanqui.

== Tomebamba ==
Built by Topa Inca and envisioned by his son Huayna Capac to be a second capital along with Cuzco, Tomebamba has some extensive networks of hydraulic construction that archeologists such as Max Uhle had ever seen. While most of the ancient city is unrecoverable due to modern construction, there is still evidence of expansive drainage systems, canals, baths, a pool, and even a manmade lake. The lake is below terraces that lead up to a structure believed to be a sun temple. Some stone features accompany these intricate aquatic systems such as a semi-circle cut stone and a large cross-shaped stone that houses a pool in the center. All of these features are fed by tanks and tunnels that are found throughout the site. Some archeologists believe that all of these elaborate waterways could have been a filtration system.

== Caranqui ==
The derelict remains of perhaps the last imperial settlement of the Inca empire, Caranqui, harbors some evidence for significant hydraulic architecture. As part of the northern expansion of the empire, Huayna Capac demonstrated complete control of water and possibly other fluids. After massacring the local men by drowning them in the nearby lake, Yaguarcocha, the Emperor erected an expansive water-system that was capable of captivating the empire's most elite. Having canals like most Inca settlements and estates, Caranqui's canals were unusual. Open and closed stone-walled channels would run parallel to each other, something uncharacteristic from what has been studied before. Some archeologists believe that the purpose of two channels running side-by-side in the heart of the city was because they carried two different fluids. Also throughout the city are what seem to be pothole-like constructions meant to carry excess water away from the city. Some of the drains flowed water into what is thought to be a semi-subterranean temple. The temple has multiple floors in which the water drains through, accumulating in a large space that was likely anticipated for large performances. The significance of this temple is the size being much larger than most baths or pools in previous Inca constructions, but also its historical significance. The temple is assuredly "estanque", a pool in which Pedro Cieza de León wrote about in his 1553 book Crónica del Perú.

== Influences on modern architecture ==
=== Frank Lloyd Wright ===
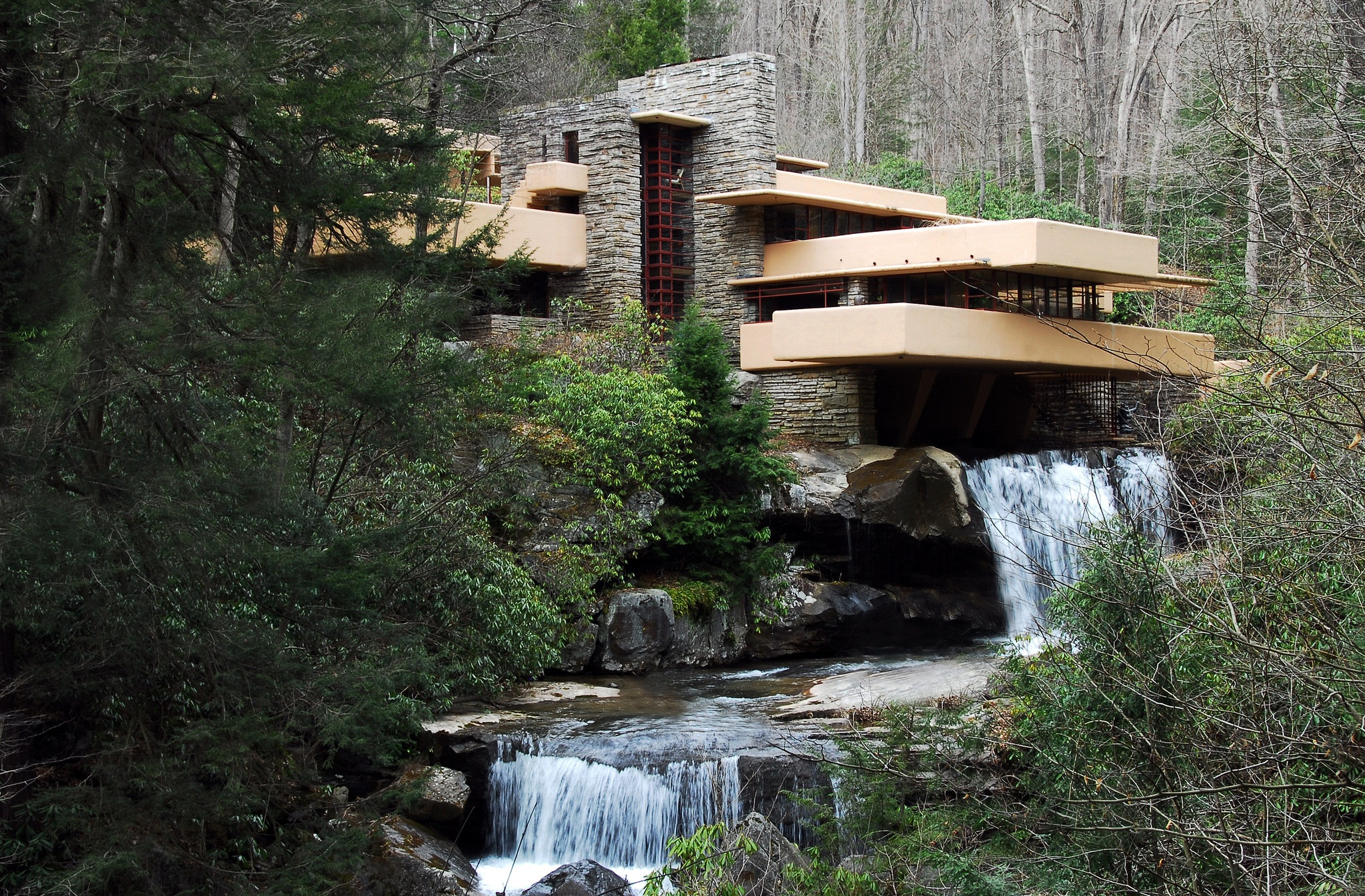
Fallingwater in Mill Run, Pennsylvania

Famed American architect of the twentieth century, Frank Lloyd Wright, had known interests in Inca architecture. The Fallingwater house in Pennsylvania is an example of this. When observed though, elements of Inca architecture shine through their modern-contemporary counterparts. As the name implies, the property is defined by its manipulation of water. Channels, pools, and fountains run throughout the house just like Inca royal estates. Having water flow through rocks was a significant part of the Inca's spiritual and cultural identity, many fountains at Fallingwater are large rock structures with channels flowing through resembling those at Inca sites. Along with distinctly Inca-inspired water features, Fallingwater also uses large natural rocks. In Inca culture, these large natural rocks sometimes noted as "living rocks", carried much spiritual significance.

== See also ==
- Inca technology
