= Inca technology =

Devices, and technologies invented or used in the Inca civilisation

Qishwachaka bridge at Cusco, crossing the Apurimac river.

Inca technology includes devices, technologies and construction methods used by the Inca people of western South America (between the 1100s and their conquest by Spain in the 1500s), including the methods Inca engineers used to construct the cities and road network of the Inca Empire.

== Hydraulic engineering ==
The builders of the empire planned and built impressive structures in their city centers, including canals, fountains, drainage systems and expansive irrigation. Inca's infrastructure and water supply system have been hailed as “the pinnacle of the architectural and engineering works of the Inca civilization”. Major Inca centers were chosen by experts who decided the site, its apportionment, and the basic layout of the city. In many cities we see great hydraulic engineering marvels. For example, in the city of Tipon, 3 irrigation canals diverted water from Rio Pukara to Tipon which is about 1.35 km north for Tipon's terraces. Tipon also had natural springs that they built fountains for that supplied noble residents with water for non agricultural purposes.

== Machu Picchu ==
In 1450, Machu Picchu was constructed. This date was determined and based on the Carbon 14 test results. The famous lost Inca city is an architectural remnant of a society whose understanding of civil and hydraulic engineering was advanced. Today, it is famously known for its remarkable preservation as well as the beauty of the building's architecture. The site is located 120 km northwest of Cuzco in the Urubamba river valley, Peru. At 2560 m above sea level, sitting atop a mountain, the city planners had to consider the steep slopes of the site as well as the humid and rainy climate. The Inca people built this site atop a hill which was terraced (most likely for agricultural purposes). In addition to terraces, Machu Picchu is composed of two additional basic architectural elements; elite residential compounds and religious structures. The site is full of staircases and sculpted rock, which were also important to their architecture and engineering practices.

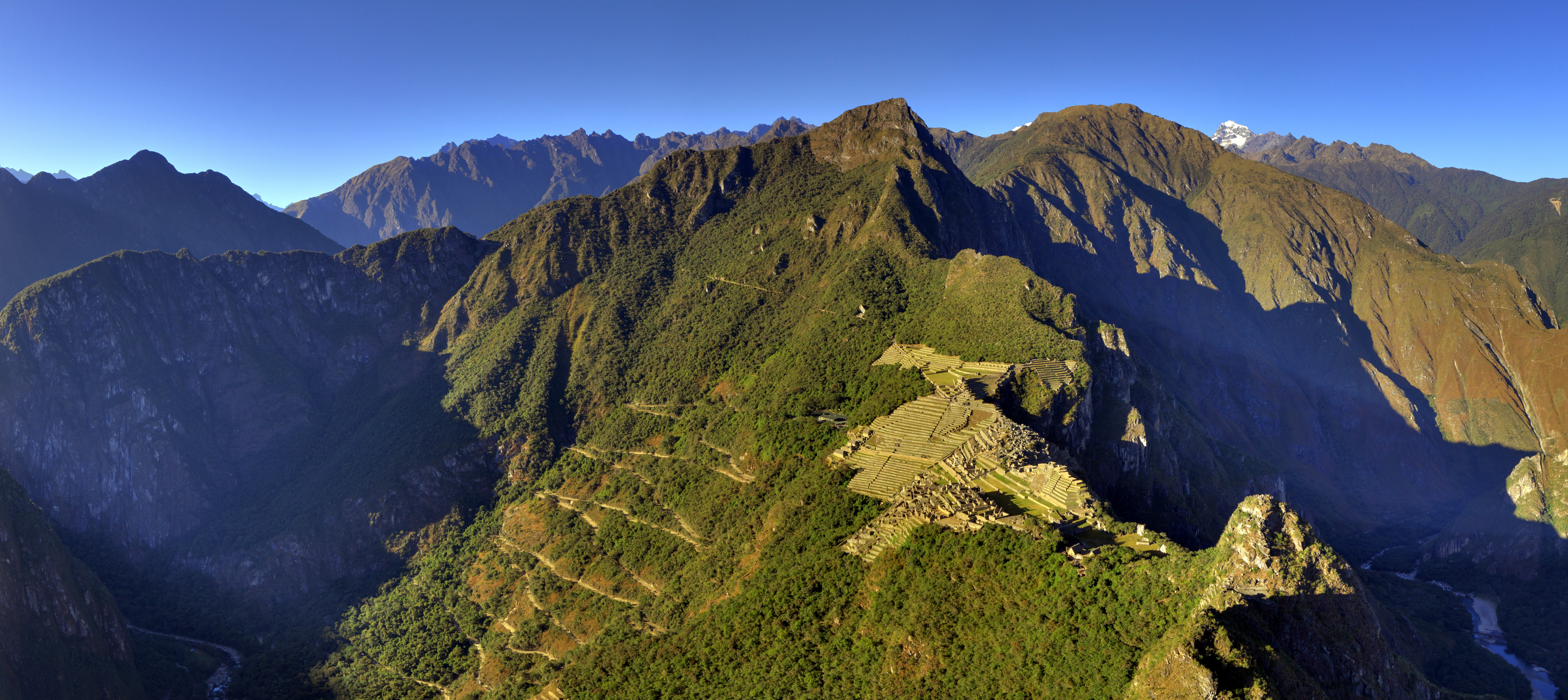
An example of Machu Picchu

Making models out of clay before beginning to build, the city planners remained consistent with Inca architecture and laid out a city that separated the agriculture and urban areas. Before construction began the engineers had to assess the spring and whether it could provide for all of the city’s anticipated citizens. After evaluating the water supply, the civil engineers designed a 2,457-foot (749 m)-long canal to what would become the city’s center. The canal descends the mountain slope, enters the city walls, passes through the agricultural sector, then crosses the inner wall into the urban sector, where it feeds a series of fountains. The fountains are publicly accessible and partially enclosed by walls that are typically about 1.2 m high, except for the lowest fountain, which is a private fountain for the Temple of the Condor and has higher walls. At the head of each fountain, a cut stone conduit carries the water to a rectangular spout, which is shaped to create a jet of water suitable for filling aryballos–a typical Inca clay water jug. The water collects in a stone basin in the floor of the fountain, then enters a circular drain that delivers it to the approach channel for the next fountain.

The Incas built the canals on steady grades, using cut stones as the water channels. Most citizens worked on the construction and maintenance of the canal and irrigation systems, bronze and stone tools to complete the water-tight stone canals. The water then traveled through the channels into sixteen fountains known as the "stairway of fountains", reserving the first water source for the Emperor. This incredible feat supplied the population of Machu Picchu, which varied between 300 and 1000 people when the emperor was present and also helped irrigate water to the farming steppes. The fountains and canal system were built so well that they would, after a few minor repairs, still work today.

To go along with the Incas' advanced water supply system, an equally impressive drainage system was built as well. Machu Picchu contains nearly 130 outlets in the center that moved the water out of the city through walls and other structures. The agriculture terraces are a feature of the complicated drainage system; the steppes helped avoid erosion and were built on a slope to aim excess water into channels that ran alongside the stairways. These channels carried the runoff into the main drain, avoiding the main water supply. This carefully planned drainage system shows the Incas' concern and appreciation for clean water. Water engineer Ken Wright and his archaeological team found the emperor’s bathing room complete with a separate drain that carried off his used bath water so it would never re-enter Machu Picchu’s water supply.

== Terraces ==
=== Terrace function and structure ===
The Inca faced many problems with living in areas with steep terrain. Two large issues were soil erosion and area to grow crops. The solution to these problems was the development of terraces, called Andenes. These terraces allowed the Inca to utilize the land for farming that they never could in the past. Everything about how the terrace functions, looks, its geometric alignment, etc. all depend on the slope of the land. The different layering of materials is part of what makes the terraces so successful. It starts with a base layer of large rocks, followed by a second layer of smaller rocks, then a layer of sand-like material, and finally the topsoil. You can practice this in a simulation here.

The most impressive part of the terraces was their drainage systems. Drain outlets were placed in the numerous stone retaining walls. The larger rocks at the base of each terrace level are what allowed the water to flow more easily through the larger spaces in between the rocks, eventually coming out at the “Main Drain”. The Inca even constructed different types of drainage channels that are used for different purposes throughout the city.

=== How they were built and why they were effective ===
Studies have indicated that when terraces like the ones in the Colca Valley were being constructed, the first step was excavating into the slope, and then a subsequent infilling of the slope. A retaining wall was built to hold the fill material. This wall had many uses, including absorbing heat from the sun during the day and radiating it back out at night, often keeping crops from freezing in the chilling nighttime temperatures, and holding back the different layers of sediment. After the wall is built, the larger rocks would be placed on the bottom, then smaller rocks, then sand, then soil.

Since the soil was now level, the water did not rush down the side of the mountain, which is what causes erosion. Previously, this erosion was so powerful that it had potential to wipe out major areas of the Inca road, as well as wash away all of the nutrients and fertile soil. Not only was it serving a purpose in crops it also was able to support canals due to the high altitude which would accumulate water and further transport it to other sections. Since the soil never washed away, nutrients would always be added from previously grown crops year after year. The Inca even grew specific crops together, to balance out the optimal amount of nutrients for all plants. For example, a planting method is known as "three sisters" incorporated the growth of corn, beans, and squash in the same terrace. This was because the fixed nitrogen in the beans helped the corn grow, while the squash acted as mulch keeping the soil moist, and also acted as a weed repellant.

== Freeze-drying ==
=== Purpose ===
All food grown or killed by the Inca could be freeze dried. Freeze drying is still very popular today. One of the biggest benefits for freeze-drying is that it takes out all of the water and moisture but leaves all of the nutritious value. The water in meats and vegetables is what gives them a lot of their weight. This is what made it very popular for transportation purposes and storage because dried meats lasted twice as long as non-freeze-dried foods.

==== Vegetables ====
Inca diet was largely vegetarian because large wild game was often reserved for special occasions. A very common and well known freeze-dried item was the potato, or when it was frozen, Chuño.

==== Meats ====
Common meats to freeze-dry included llama, alpaca, duck, and guinea pig. Transportation and storage of jerky (ch'arki in Quechua) was much easier to transport and lasted longer than not dried meats. These all had potential to be freeze-dried.

=== Process ===
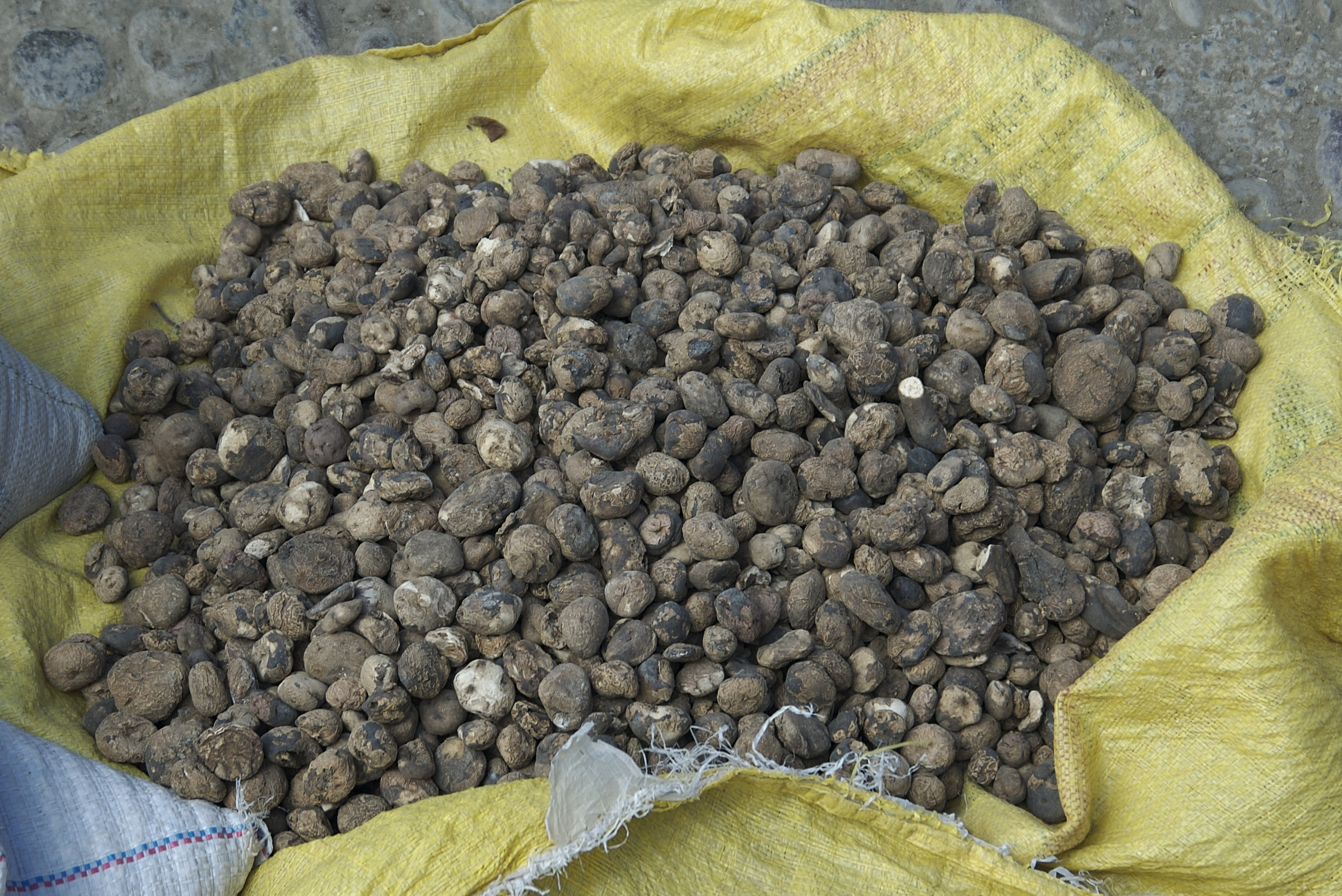
Chuño

Both meats and vegetables went through a similar freezing process. They would start by laying all the different foods on rocks and during the cold nights in high altitudes with dry air they would freeze. The next morning, a combination of the thin dry air and the heat from the sun would melt the ice and evaporate all the moisture.They would also trample over it in the morning to get any extra moisture out.

The process of freeze-drying was important for transportation and storage. The high elevation (low atmospheric pressure) and low temperatures of the Andes mountains is what allowed them to take advantage of this process.

== Burning mirror ==
The chronicler Inca Garcilaso de la Vega described the use of a burning mirror as part of the annual "Inti Raymi" (sun festival):

"The fire for that sacrifice had to be new, given by the hand of the sun, as they said. For which they took a large bracelet, which they call Chipana (similar to others that the Incas commonly wore on the left wrist) which the high priest had; it was large, larger than the common ones, it had for a medallion a concave vessel, the shape of a half orange and brightly polished, they put it against the sun, and at a certain point where the rays that came out of the vessel hit each other, they put a bit of finely unravelled cotton (they did not know how to make tinder), which caught fire naturally in a short space of time. With this fire, thus given by the hand of the sun, the sacrifice was burned and all the meat of that day was roasted."

== Pathway systems ==
The vast size of the Inca empire made it essential that efficient and effective transportation systems were created and built to assist in the exchanging of goods, services, people, etc. At one point, "their (the Inca) empire eventually extended across western South America from Quito in the north to Santiago in the south, making it the largest empire ever seen in the Americas and the largest in the world at that time (between c. 1400 and 1533 CE)." It is known to have "extended some 3500-4000 km along the mountainous backbone of South America." The trails, roads, and bridges were designed not only to link the empire physically, but these structures also helped the empire to maintain communication.

=== Rope bridges ===
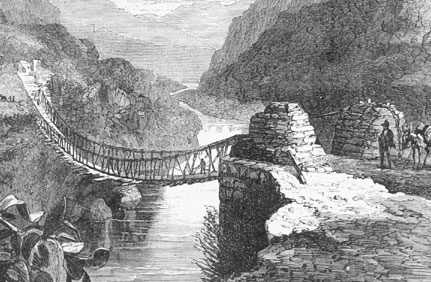
An example of an Inca rope bridge, litograph of 1845 by E. G. Squier

Rope bridges were an integral part of the Inca road system. "Five centuries ago, the Andes were strung with suspension bridges. By some estimates there were as many as 200 of them." As pictured to the right, these structures were used to connect two land masses, allowing for the flow of ideas, goods, people, animals, etc. across the Incan empire. "The Inca suspension bridges achieved clear spans of at least 150 feet, probably much greater. This was a longer span than any European masonry bridges at the time." Since the Incan people did not use wheeled vehicles, most traveled by foot and/or used animals to help in the transporting of goods.

==== Construction ====
Although these bridges were assembled using twisted mountain grass, other vegetation, and saplings, they were dependable. These structures were able to both support the weight of traveling people and animals as well as withstand weather conditions over certain amounts of time. Since grass rots away over time, the bridges had to be rebuilt every year.

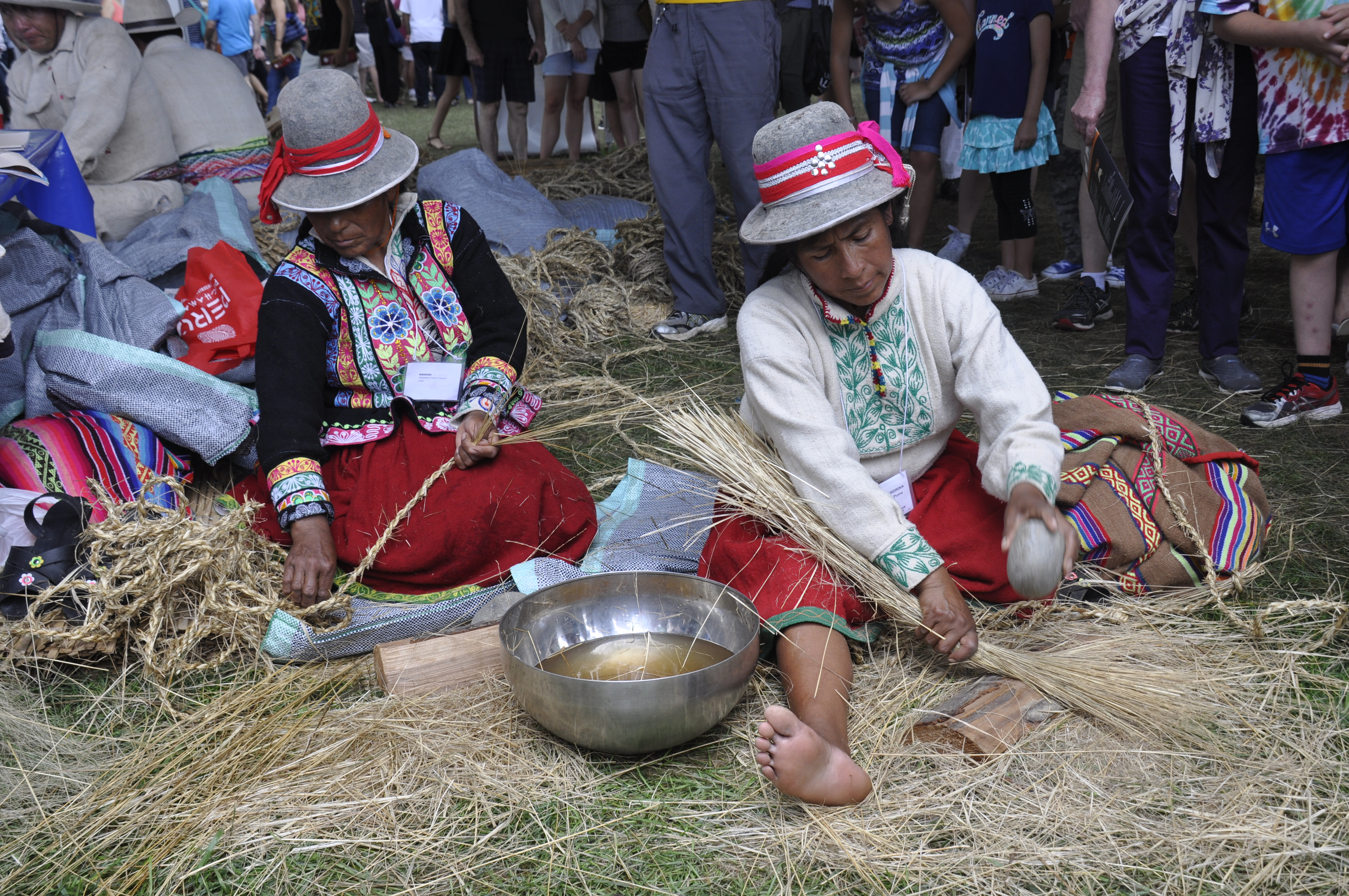
Pictured is the weaving of grass into rope to be used in the formation of a bridge

When the Inca people began building a grass suspension bridge, they would first gather natural materials of grass and other vegetation. They would then braid these elements together into rope. This contribution was made by the Inca women. Vast amounts of thin-looking rope were produced. The villagers would then deliver their quota of rope to the builders. The rope was then divided into sections. Each section consisted of an amount of thin rope being laid out together in preparation to create a thicker rope cord. Once the sections are laid out, the strands of rope made earlier are twisted together tightly and evenly, producing the larger and thicker rope cord. These larger ropes are then braided together to create cables, some as thick as a human torso. Depending on the dimensions of the cable, each could weigh up to 200 pounds. These cables were then delivered to the bridge site.

It was considered bad luck for women to be anywhere near the construction of the bridge, so the Inca men were therefore in charge of the on-site construction. At the bridge site, a builder(s) would travel to the opposite landmass that they were working to connect. Once they were positioned on the opposite side, one of the thin, light-weight ropes would be thrown over to them. This rope would then be used to pull the main cables over the gorge. Stone beams were built on either side of the gorge and were used in helping to position and secure the cables. The cables were wrapped around these stone beams and tightened inch by inch to decrease any slack in the bridge. Once this was finished, the riggers carefully made their way across the hanging cables, tying the foot-ropes together and connecting the handrails and the foot-ropes with the remainder of the thin grass ropes. Not all rope bridges were exactly alike in terms of design and build. Some riggers also wove pieces of wood into the foot-ropes.

Modern-day rope bridge builders in Huinchiri, Peru make offerings to Pacha Mama, otherwise known as "Mother Earth," throughout their building process to ensure that the bridge will be strong and safe. This may have been a practice used by the Inca people since they too were religious. If all went smoothly and if tasks were performed in a timely fashion, a bridge had the potential of being constructed in three days.

==== Modern rope bridges ====
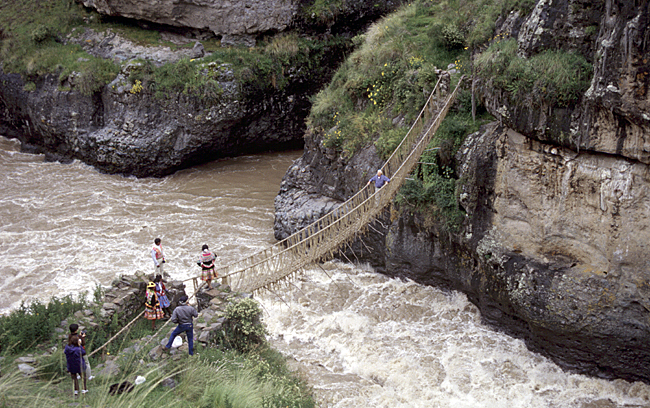
An example of a rope bridge

People today continue to honor Incan traditions and expand their knowledge in the building of rope bridges.

"Each June in Huinchiri, Peru, four Quechua communities on two sides of a gorge join together to build a bridge out of grass, creating a form of ancient infrastructure that dates back at least five centuries to the Inca Empire." The previous Q’eswachaka Bridge is cut down and swept away by the Apurímac River current and a new bridge is built in its place. This tradition links the Quechua communities of the Huinchiri, Chaupibanda, Choccayhua, and Ccollana Quehue to their past ancestors.

“According to our grandfathers, this bridge was built during the time of the Inkas 600 years ago, and on it they walked their llamas and alpacas carrying their produce.” - Eleuterio Ccallo Tapia

"A small portion of a 60-foot replica built by Quechua weavers is on view in The Great Inka Road: Engineering an Empire at the Smithsonian’s National Museum of the American Indian in Washington, DC." This exhibit was on display at the museum through June 27, 2021. Visitors are also encouraged to experience this exhibit online. Either way, museums like the Smithsonian are working to preserve and display examples and knowledge of the Inca inspired rope bridges today.

John Wilford shares in the New York Times that students at the Massachusetts Institute of Technology are learning much more than how objects are made. They are being taught to observe and test how archeology entwines with culture. Wilford's article was written in 2007. At this time, students involved in a course called “materials in human experience,” were busy making a 60-foot-long fiber bridge in the Peruvian style. Through this project, they were introduced to the Inca people's way of thinking and building. After creating their ropes and cables, they had planned to stretch the bridge across a dry basin between two campus buildings.

=== Roads ===
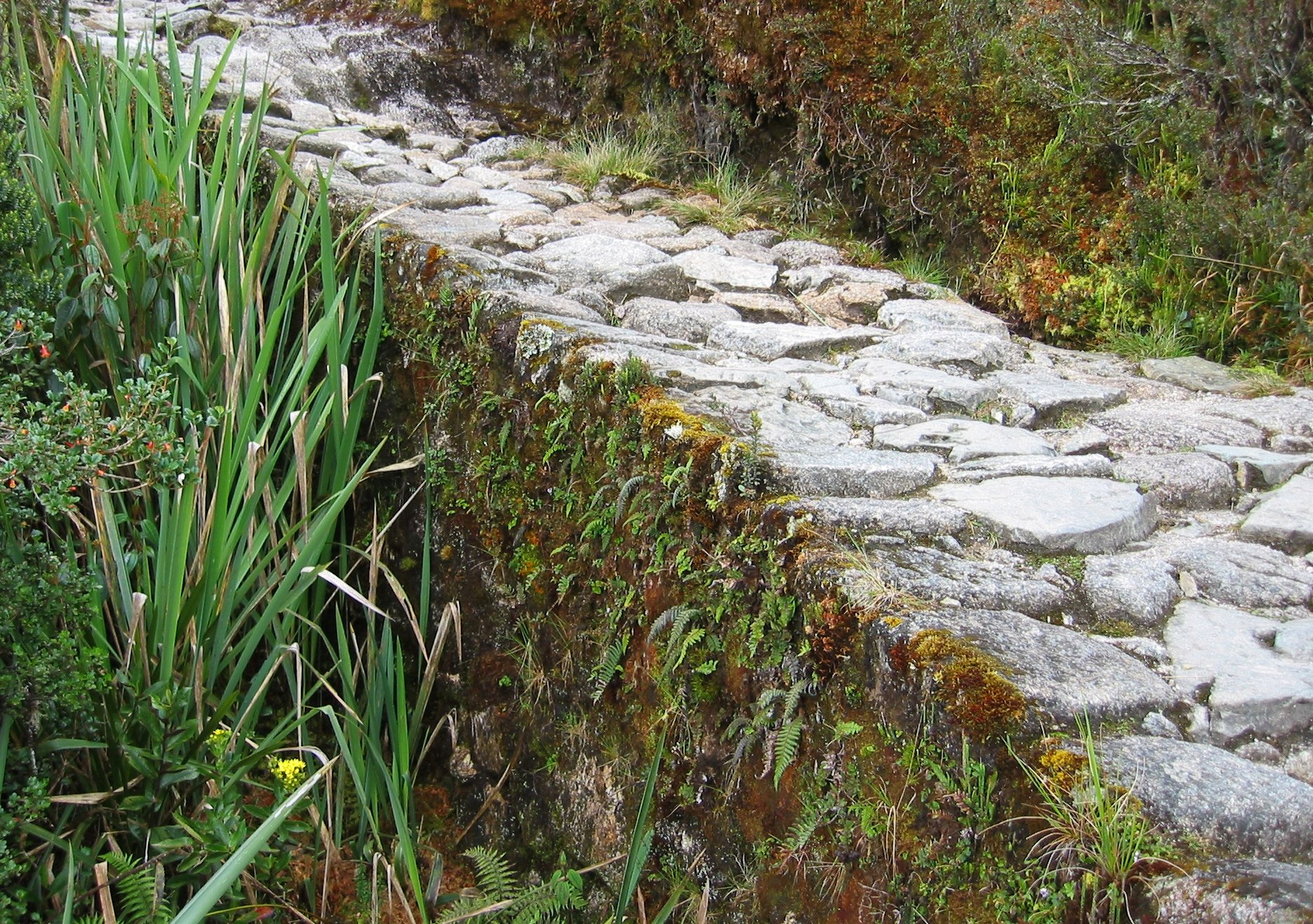
This trail was originally constructed by the Inca in Peru. It is now part of the Inca trail to Machu Picchu.

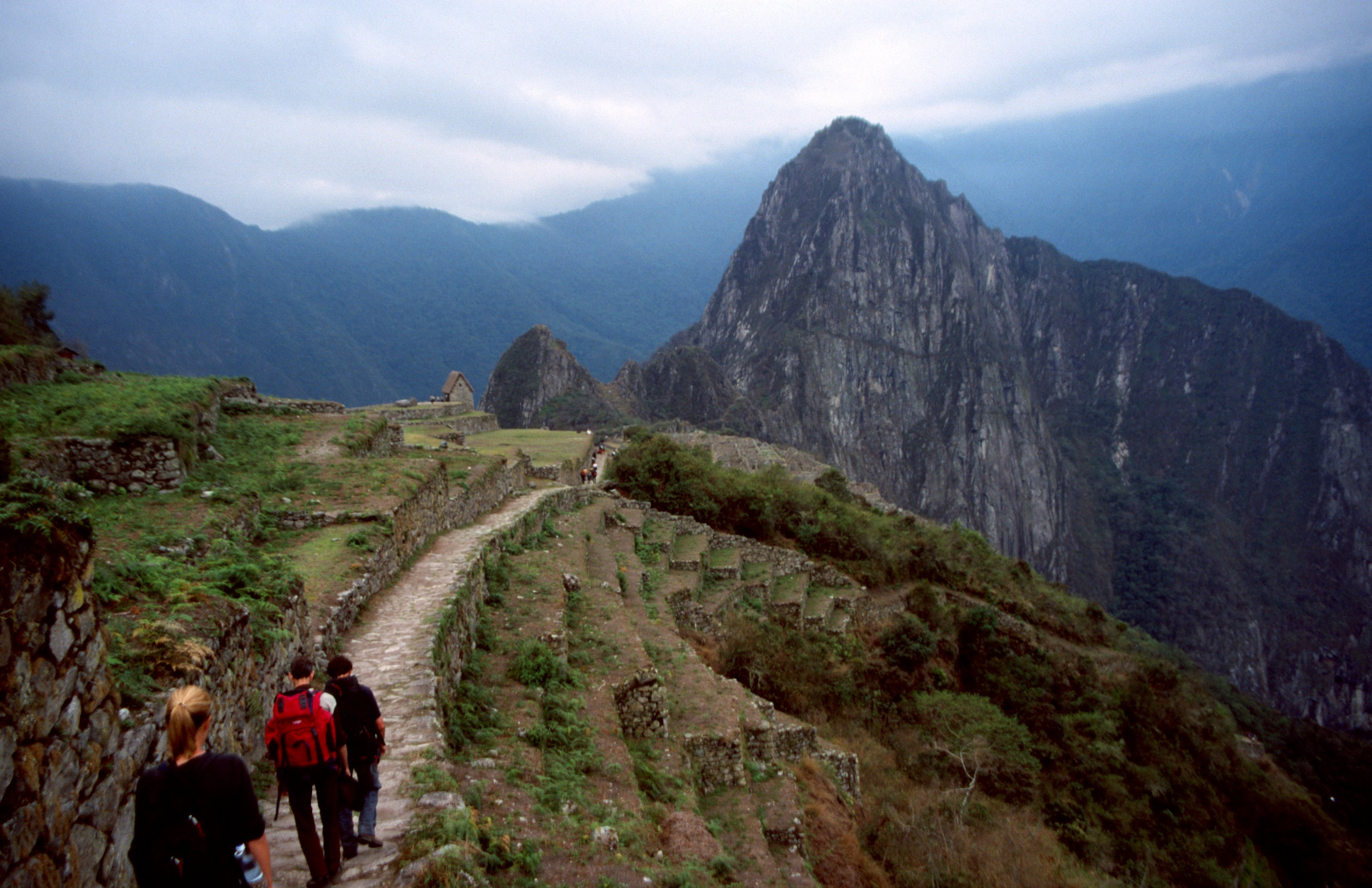
An example of the Inca trail from Cusco to Machu Picchu in Peru.

According to author Mark Cartwright, "Inca roads covered over 40,000 km (25,000 miles), principally in two main highways running north to south across the Inca Empire, which eventually spread over ancient Peru, Ecuador, Chile and Bolivia." Several sources challenge Cartwright's claim in stating that the Inca roads covered either more or less area then he describes. This number is difficult to solidify since some of the pathways of the Inca still may remain unaccounted for, being that they may have been washed away or covered by natural forces. "Inca engineers were also undaunted by geographical difficulties and built roads across ravines, rivers, deserts, and mountain passes up to 5,000 meters high." Many of the constructed roads are not uniform in design. Most of the uncovered roads are about one to four meters wide. Although this is true, some roads, such as the highway in Huanuco Pampa province, can be much larger. As mentioned in the Pathway systems section, the Inca people mainly traveled on foot. Knowing this, the roads created were most likely built and paved for both humans and animals to walk and/or run along. Several roads were paved with stones or cobbles and some were "edged and protected with the use of small stone walls, stone markers, wooden or cane posts, or piles of stones." Drainage was something that was of particular interest and importance to the Inca people. Drains and culverts were built to ensure that rainwater would effectively run off of the road's surface. The drains and culverts helped in directing the accumulating water either along or under the road.

==== Uses ====
As mentioned in the section Pathway systems, there were several uses for the Inca roads. The most obvious way in which the Inca people used the road/trail systems was to transport goods. They did this on foot and sometimes with the help of animals (llamas and alpacas).

Not only were goods transported throughout the vast empire, but so were ideas and messages. The Inca needed a system of communication, so they relied on Chasquis, otherwise known as messengers. The Chasquis were chosen among the strongest and fittest young males. They ran several miles per day, only to deliver messages. These messengers resided in cabins called "tambos." These structures were positioned along the roads and built by the Inca people. These buildings provided the Chasquis with a place to rest. These places of rest could also be used to house the Inca army in a situation of rebellion or war.

==== Modern Inca roads ====
Today, many people travel to South America to hike the Inca trail. Walking and climbing the trail not only serves the purpose of allowing visitors to experience the historic pathways of the Inca people, but it allows for tourists and locals to see the Inca ruins, mountains, and exotic vegetation and animals.

== Bibliography ==
- “Inka Hydraulic Engineering”, University of Colorado at Denver. 19 September 2006.
- Brown, Jeff L. “Water Supply and Drainage Systems at Machu Picchu” 19 September 2006
- Wright, Kenneth R. “Machu Picchu: Prehistoric Public Works.” American Public Works Association APWA Reporter, 17 November 2003
- D’Altroy, Terence N. and Christine A. Hastorf. Empire and Domestic Economy. New York: Kluwer Academic/Plenum Publishers, 2001.
- Wright, Kenneth, Jonathan M. Kelly, Alfredo Valencia Zegarra. “Machu Pichu: Ancient Hydraulic Engineering”. Journal of Hydraulic Engineering, October 1997.
- Bauer, Brian. The Development of the Inca State. University of Texas Press, Austin, 1992.
- Hyslop, John. Inka Settlement Planning. University of Texas Press, Austin, 1990.
