= Victoriano Arizapana =

Quechua master rope bridge engineer

Victoriano Arizapana Huayhua is a Quechua master rope bridge engineer (Quechua: chakaruwaq), notable for being the lead builder of the Q'iswa Chaka (Quechua for "rope bridge"), which is the last remaining traditionally built Inca rope bridge and a part of the historical Qhapaq Ñan Inca road network. He is also a teacher and cultural figure, preserving and transmitting to future generations the bridgebuilding techniques passed to him by his ancestors.

== Preservation of the Q'iswa Chaka ==
The Q'iswa Chaka spans the Apurímac River. Aside from being the last of its kind, the bridge is significant as an example of the Inca people's advanced engineering practices, which predated European contact. Because it is constructed from rope made of grass, it must be rebuilt by the local community every year. Arizapana leads these efforts, assisted by fellow bridge architect Eleutario Ccallo Tapia. Construction begins on the second week of June and lasts for three days, and over 1,000 people are involved in the process, which includes tasks such as performing rituals and making the rope. According to Arizapana, he learned the craft from his grandfather and father, each of whom had been lead bridge builders and passed the position by birthright on to their son. Similarly, Arizapana has been teaching the skills to his own son, and states that it will be his son's job to maintain the bridge after he is gone.

== Accolades and notable events ==
On August 12, 2010, the Q'iswa Chaka was named part of Peru's National Cultural Patrimony, and Arizapana was awarded the title of Personalidad Meritoria de la Cultura Peruana (Meritorious Person of Peruvian Culture) by the Peru Ministry of Culture. In 2013, the "Knowledge, skills and rituals related to the annual renewal of the Q’eswachaka bridge," of which Arizapana is a primary living example, was named to the UNESCO Representative List of the Intangible Cultural Heritage of Humanity. In January 2012, Arizapana was the subject of a news article when it was reported that he had been prevented from boarding a flight from Lima to Cusco because of his traditional dress. This action was denounced by the Ministry of Culture.

In 2015, the Smithsonian Folklife Festival featured the Q'iswa Chaka, and Arizapana, Ccallo, and many of their fellow bridge engineers and builders traveled to Washington, D.C. to participate. As part of the festival, Arizapana's team created an Inca rope bridge on the National Mall using the same construction methods that they use for the Q'iswa Chaka. After the festival's completion, the finished bridge was donated to the collection of the Smithsonian National Museum of the American Indian. One section of the bridge went on display as part of the exhibit The Great Inka Road: Engineering an Empire, and another section was planned to be exhibited in the imagiNATIONS Activity Center for children at the museum's George Gustav Heye Center in New York City.
