= Inca Bridge =

Bridge providing access to Machu Picchu in Peru

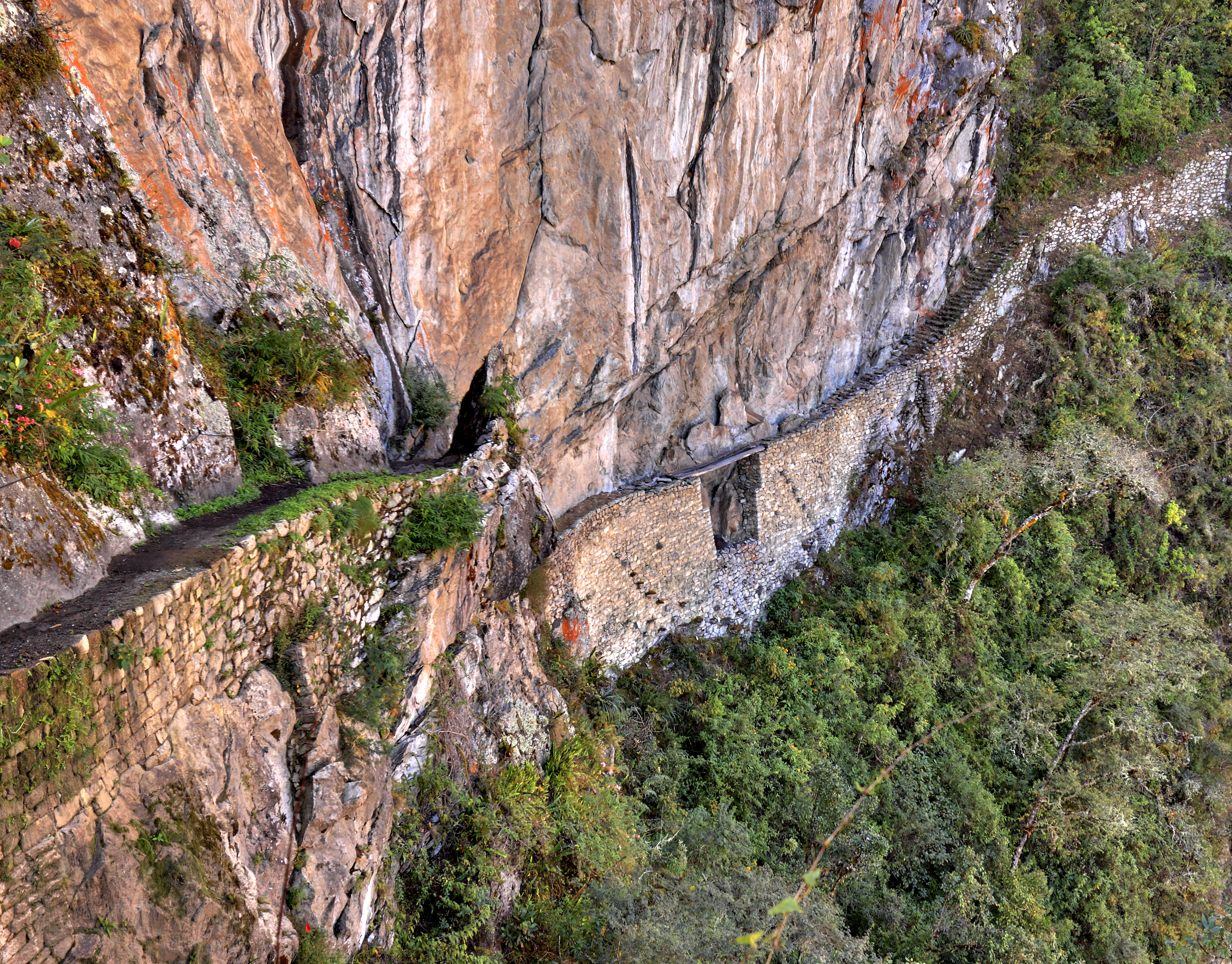
- Close-up view of the Inca Bridge
- Coordinates: 13°10′15″S 72°32′38″W
- Carries: Pedestrians
- Locale: Machu Picchu, Peru
- Other name: Inka Bridge

Characteristics
- Design: Inca trunk bridge
- Material: Trunk

Location
- Interactive map of Inca Bridge

The Inca Bridge or Inka Bridge refers to one of two places related to access to Machu Picchu, in Peru.

One of the two was built by the Incas as a secret entrance of the holy Picchu for the Inca army.

== The Inca Bridge (trunk bridge) ==
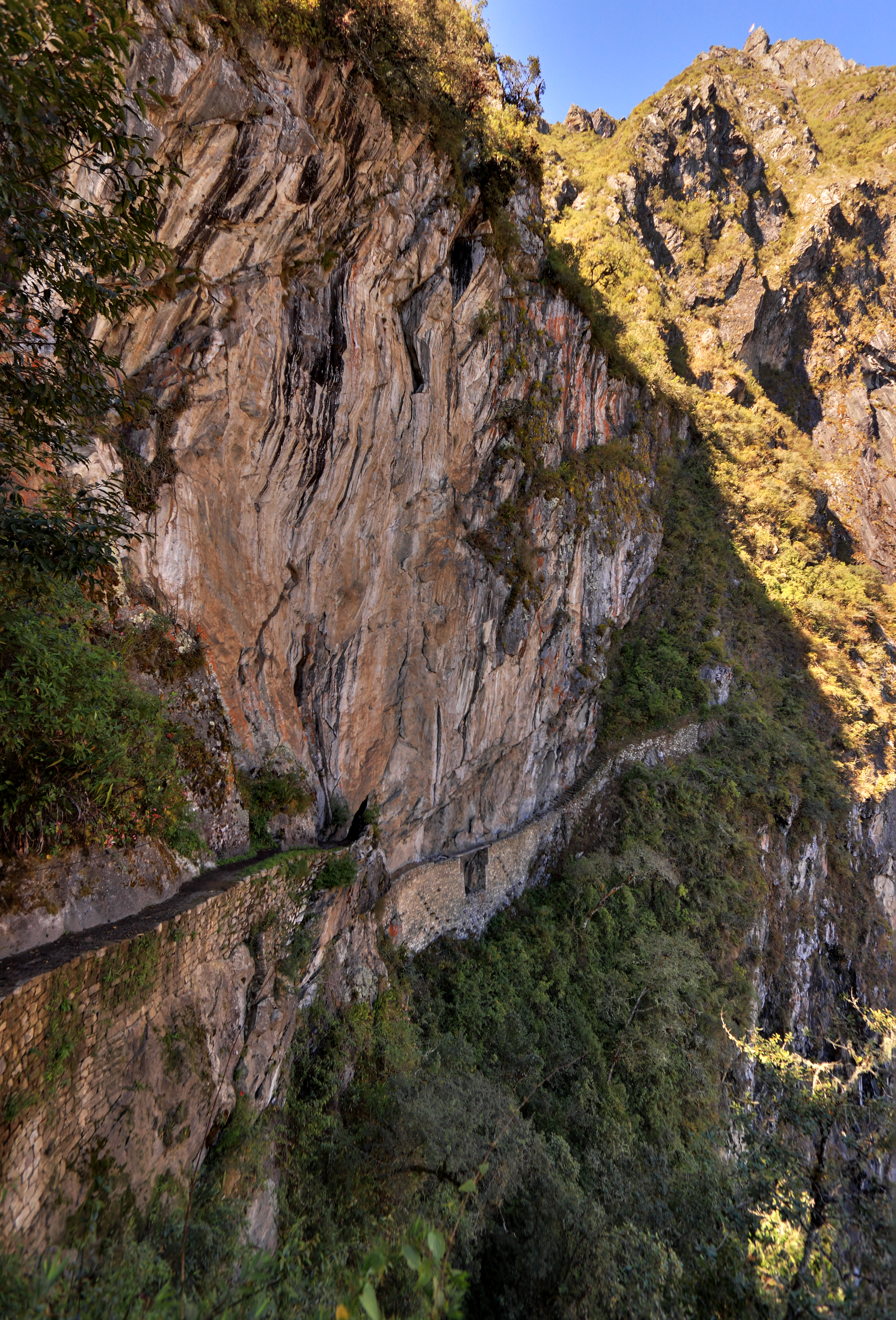
The cliff towering over the Inca Bridge

This Inca Bridge is a part of a mountain trail that heads west from Machu Picchu. The trail is a stone path, part of which is cut into a cliff face. A twenty-foot gap was left in this section of the carved cliff edge, over a 1,900-foot drop, that could be bridged with two tree trunks, otherwise leaving the trail impassable to outsiders.

== The Inca Bridge (rope bridge) ==
This Inca Bridge was an ancient Inca grass rope bridge out of Machu Picchu, crossing the Urubamba River southeast of Cusco in the Pongo de Mainique. Every one or two years, a replica bridge is constructed from dried grasses and wood. The biannual changing of the bridge is celebrated as a major event by locals.

== Other rope bridges ==
The Q'iswa Chaka (Quechua for "rope bridge"), believed to be the last remaining Inca rope bridge, spans the Apurímac River near Huinchiri, Peru in the province of Canas.

The Mawk'a Chaka (Quechua for "old bridge", hispanicized spelling Mauca Chaca), an historic suspension bridge over the Apurímac River, near Quebrada Honda, the town of Curahuasi and the Cconoc thermal baths (13°31′46″S 72°38′35″W), disappeared by the end of the 19th century after 300 years of service. There are still remnants of the access tunnels and the bridge supports. Local organizations are planning to rebuild the bridge with its access roads and tunnels to serve the hiking community and provide a view of the gorge.

== See also ==
- Puente del Inca ("Inca Bridge"), a natural arch that forms a bridge over the Las Cuevas River in Argentina.
