= Conjunctive use =

Conjunctive use is often used in discussing water supplies and water conservation. This phrase usually is used to describe the practice of storing surface water in a groundwater basin in wet years and withdrawing it from the basin in dry years. Conjunctive use consists of harmoniously combining the use of both surface water and groundwater in order to minimise the undesirable physical, environmental and economical effects of each solution and to optimise the water demand
