= Inca rope bridge =

Traditional Peruvian suspension bridge

Inca rope bridges
- The annually reconstructed Queshuachaca ("rope bridge") in the Quehue District is the last of its kind.
- Span range: Short
- Material: Grass or other fiber rope, appropriate decking material
- Movable: No
- Design effort: Advanced for its time
- Falsework required: No

Inca rope bridges are simple suspension bridges over canyons, gorges and rivers (pongos) constructed by the Inca Empire. The bridges were an integral part of the Inca road system and exemplify Inca innovation in engineering. Bridges of this type were useful since the Inca people did not use wheeled transport – traffic was limited to pedestrians and livestock – and they were frequently used by chasqui runners delivering messages throughout the Inca Empire.

== Construction and maintenance ==
The bridges were constructed using ichu grass woven into large bundles which were very strong. Part of the bridge's strength and reliability came from the fact that each cable was replaced every year by local villagers as part of their mit'a public service or obligation. In some instances, these local peasants had the sole task of repairing these bridges so that the Inca highways or road systems could continue to function. Repairing these bridges was dangerous, with those performing repairs often facing death.

In 1615, in Quechua author Huamán Poma's manuscript The First New Chronicle, Poma illustrates the Guambo rope bridge in use. He describes the masonry bridges as a positive result of the Spanish colonization of Peru, as the new bridges prevented deaths from the dangerous repair work.

== Famous examples ==
The greatest bridges of this kind were in the Apurímac Canyon along the main road north from Cusco; a famous example spans a 45-meter gap that is supposed to be the inspiration behind Thornton Wilder's 1928 Pulitzer Prize winning novel The Bridge of San Luis Rey (1927).

Made of grass, the last remaining Inca rope bridge, reconstructed every June, is the Q'iswa Chaka (Quechua for "rope bridge"), spanning the Apurimac River near Huinchiri, in Canas Province, Quehue District, Peru. Even though there is a modern bridge nearby, the residents of the region keep the ancient tradition and skills alive by renewing the bridge annually in June. Several family groups have each prepared a number of grass-ropes to be formed into cables at the site; others prepare mats for decking, and the reconstruction is a communal effort. The builders have indicated that effort is performed to honor their ancestors and the Pachamama (Earth Mother).

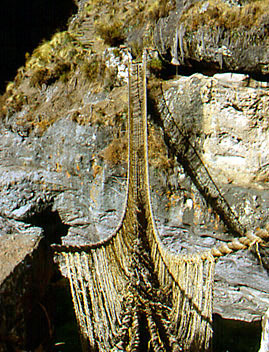
The old bridge sags
(Slide show)

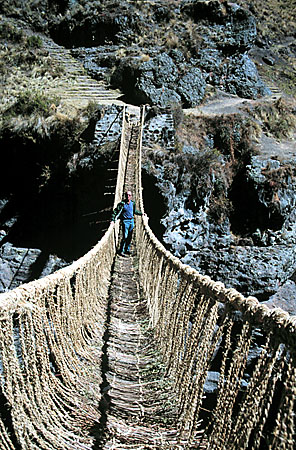
Notice how much less the new bridge sags

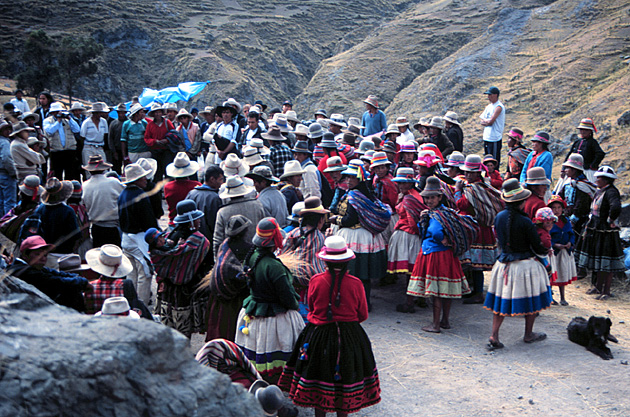
Builders gather during the renewal

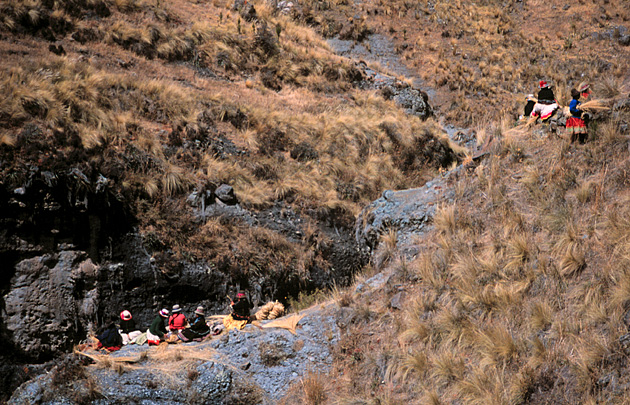
Preparing side lashings

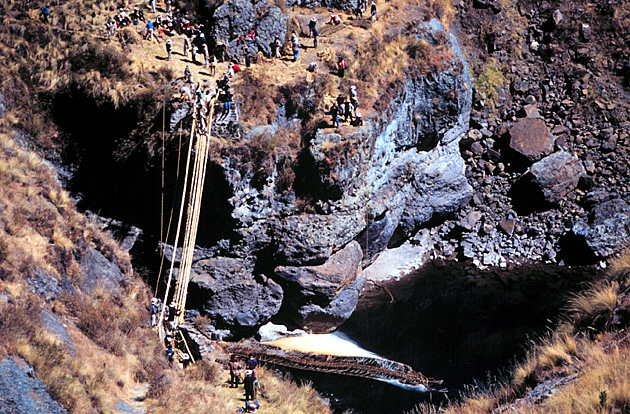
Main cable and hand-ropes are in place

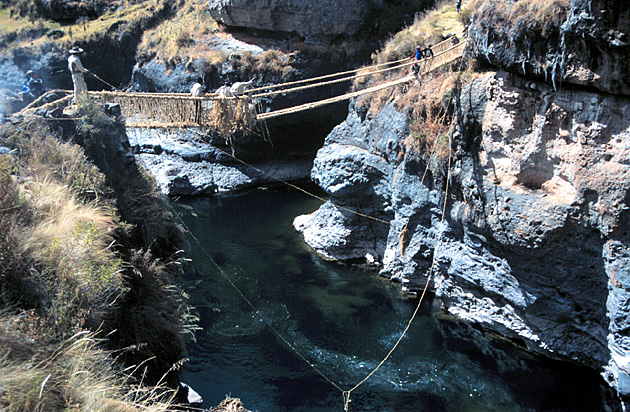
Lashing the hand-ropes to the main side cables.

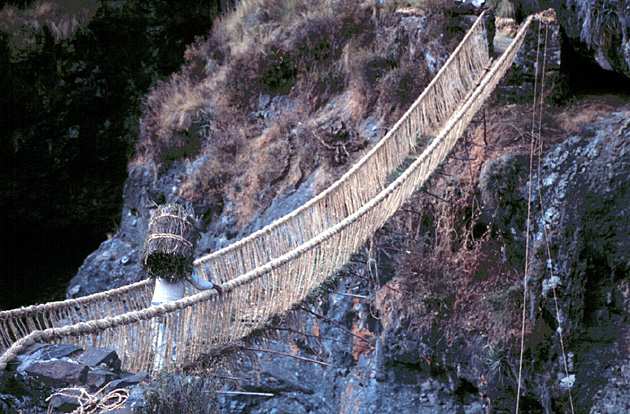
Trimmed mat rolls form the bridge deck.

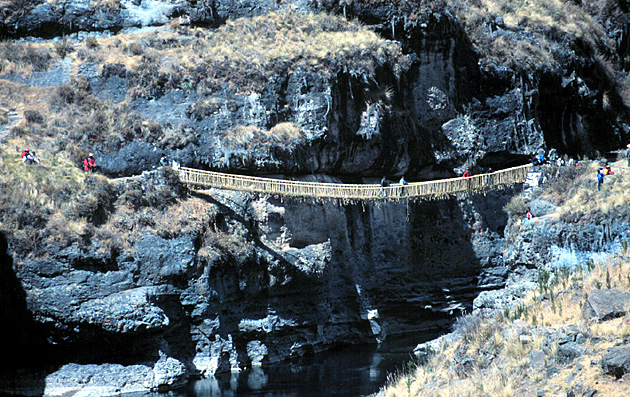
The new bridge is now complete and in use.

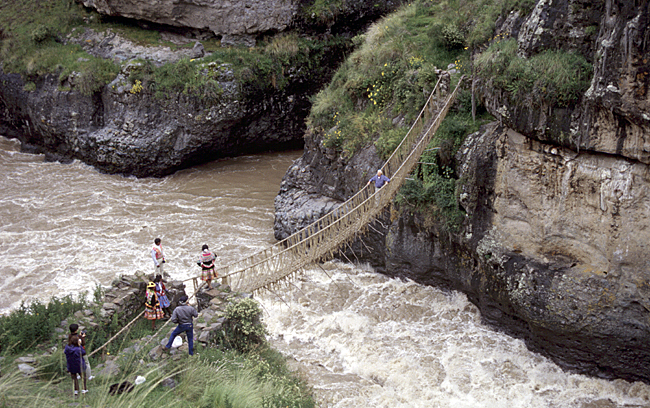
Bridge in use during the rainy season.

== See also ==
- Carrick-a-Rede Rope Bridge, a rope suspension bridge in Northern Ireland
- Inca Bridge, rope bridge, secret entrance to Machu Picchu
- Simple suspension bridge. see the image of the Inca rope bridge built with modern materials and structural refinements
- Suspension bridge, modern suspended-deck type

== Bibliography ==
- Chmielinski, Piotr (1987). "Kayaking the Amazon". National Geographic Magazine. 171 (4): 460–473.
- Finch, Ric (Fall–Winter 2002). "Keshwa Chaca: Straw Bridge of the Incas". South American Explorer. No. 69. Ithaca, NY. pp. 6–13.
- Gade, D. W. (1972). "Bridge types in the central Andes". Annals of the Association of American Geographers. 62 (1): 94–109. doi:10.1111/j.1467-8306.1972.tb00846.x. Showed the bridge at Huinchiri and predicted the art of building it would be lost within another generation, which proved untrue.
- Hurtado, Ursula. "Q'eshwachaka: El Puente Dorado". Credibank. Peru). pp. 22–23. Describes the documentary film directed by Jorge Carmona.
- Malaga Miglio, Patricia; Gutierrez, Alberto. "Qishwachaca". Rumbos. Peru. pp. 30–34.
- McIntyre, Loren (1973). "The Lost Empire of the Incas". National Geographic Magazine. Vol. 144, no. 6. pp. 729–787.
- McIntyre, Loren (1975). The Incredible Incas and Their Timeless Land. Washington D.C.: National Geographic Society. ISBN 978-0-87044-177-6.
- Roca Basadre, David; Coaguila, Jorge, eds. (2001). Cañon delApurimac, La Ruta Sagrada del Dios Hablador. Lima: Empresa Editora ElComercio. p. 78.
- "Secrets of Lost Empires: Inca". Nova. PBS. 1995.
- Von Hagen, Victor (1955). Highway of the Sun. New York: Duell, Sloan and Pearce. p. 120.
