= Queshuachaca =

Last remaining Inca rope bridge

Queshuachaca Q’ichwa Chaka
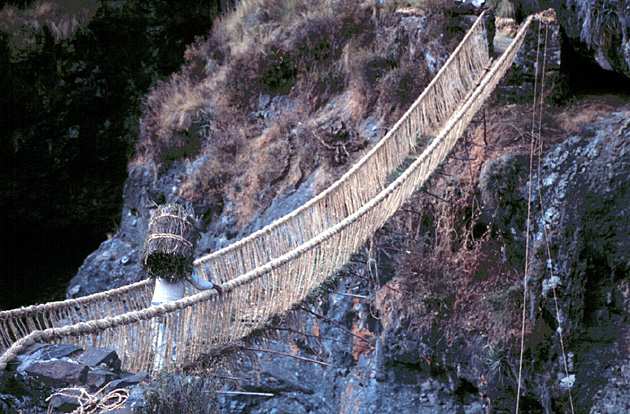
- Queshuachaca bridge
- Coordinates: 14°22′53″S 71°29′02″W
- Carries: Pedestrians
- Crosses: Apurímac River
- Locale: Quehue District, Peru

Characteristics
- Design: Inca rope bridge
- Material: Ichu grass
- Total length: 28 metres (92 ft)
- Width: 1.2 metres (3 ft 11 in)

Cultural Heritage of Peru
- Official name: Ritual de reconstrucción del puente Q'eswachaka
- Type: Intangible
- Criteria: Productive practices and technologies
- Designated: 5 August 2009; 17 years ago
- Legal basis: R.S. 1112/INC-2009

Location
- Interactive map of Queshuachaca

Knowledge, skills and rituals related to the annual renewal of the Q'eswachaka bridge
- UNESCO Intangible Cultural Heritage
- Country: Peru
- Reference: 00594
- Region: Latin America and the Caribbean

Inscription history
- Inscription: 2013 (8th session)
- List: Representative

Queshuachaca (Note: The name gets spelled very differently, mostly with the first element varying between <Q'eswa ~ Q'iswa ~ Queshua ~ Quishua> and the second between <Chaka ~ Chaca>. The first word is from Cuzco Quechua, q'ichwa [qʼeʃwa ~ qʼeswa] meaning 'straw rope'; not to be confused with similar-sounding qhichwa [qʰeʃwa ~ qʰeswa], meaning 'temperate valley' or 'Quechua language'.) (from Cuzco Quechua q’ichwa chaka 'straw-rope bridge', Quechua pronunciation: [̩q’eʃ.waˈtʃa.ka ~ ̩q’es.waˈtʃa.ka]) is the last remaining Inca rope bridge, consisting of grass ropes that span the Apurímac River near Huinchiri, in Quehue District, Canas Province, Peru.

Even though there is a modern bridge nearby, the residents of the region keep the ancient tradition and skills alive by renewing the bridge annually, during the second week of June. Several family groups from the communities of Chaupibanda, Choccayhua, Huinchiri and Collana Quehue, have each prepared a number of grass-ropes to be formed into cables at the site, others prepare mats for decking, and the reconstruction is a communal effort. In ancient times the effort would have been a form of tax (Mit'a), with participants expected to perform the rebuilding; nowadays the builders have indicated that the effort is performed to honor their ancestors and the Pachamama (Earth Mother).

The event has also been supported by video productions for Nova and the BBC and is the subject of an independent documentary titled The Last Bridge Master (in-production, 2014). It is becoming a minor tourist attraction, with some small tolls charged for tourists to use the road during the festival to walk the newly completed bridge. In 2009 the government recognized the bridge and its maintenance as part of the cultural heritage of Peru, and there is now some outside sponsorship. The lead bridge engineer was Victoriano Arizapana.

== Damages ==
Due to a lack of maintenance during the COVID-19 pandemic in 2020 and early 2021, the bridge collapsed in March 2021. In the following weeks the bridge was rebuilt.

The bridge fell again on the early morning of May 17, 2025 as result of a vandalic act by unknown persons, which led the Calca Prosecutor's Office to investigate and to be restored once again.

== Renewing the bridge ==
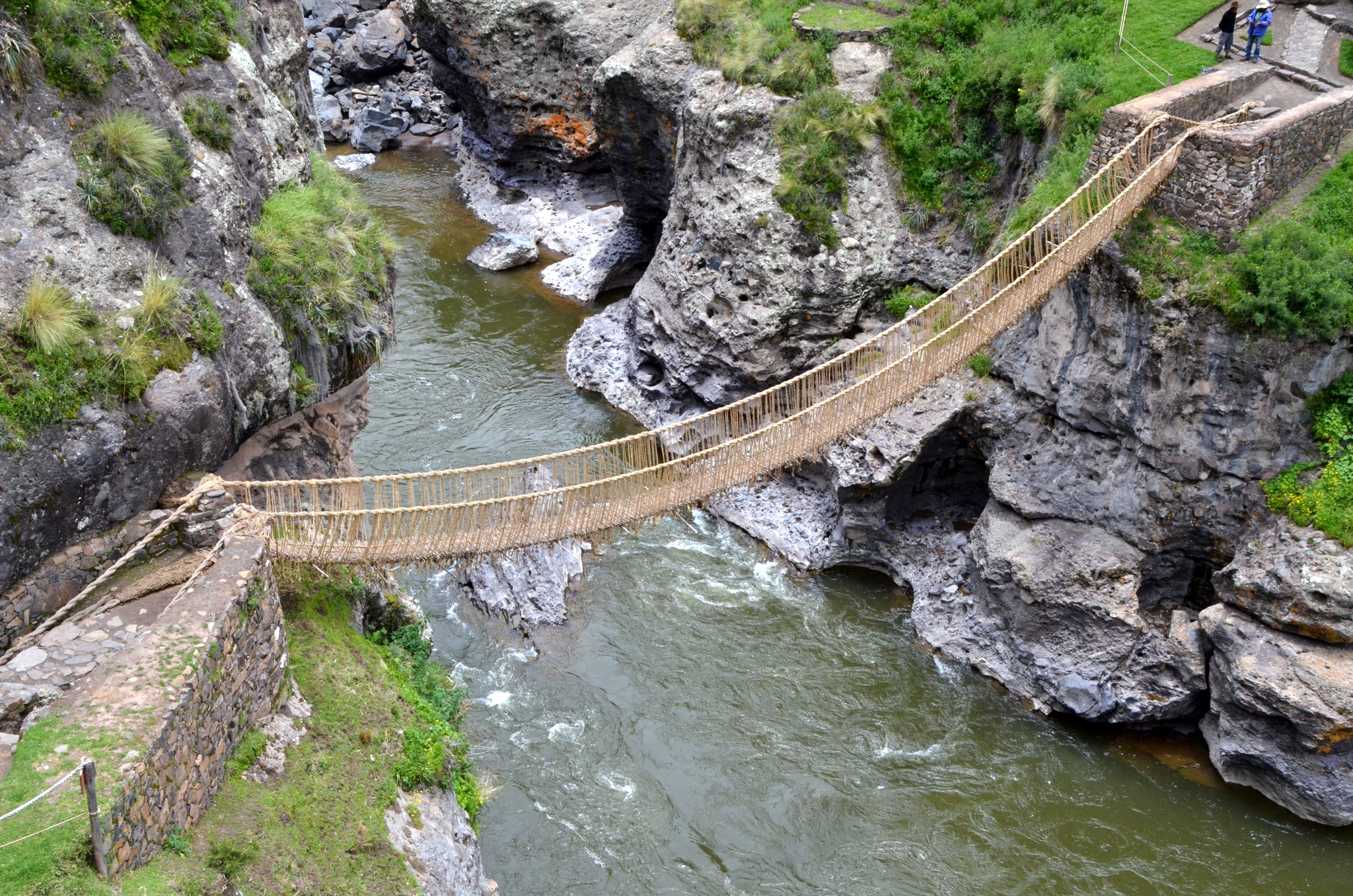
The Q'eswachaka bridge

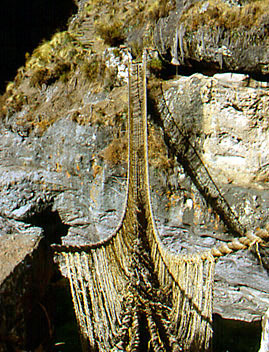
The sagging old bridge
(Slide show)

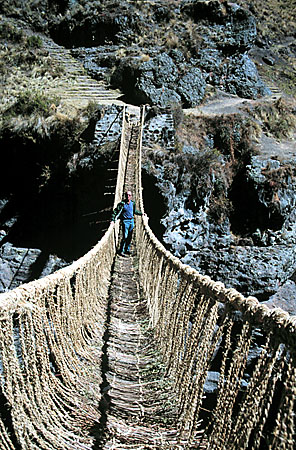
The new bridge

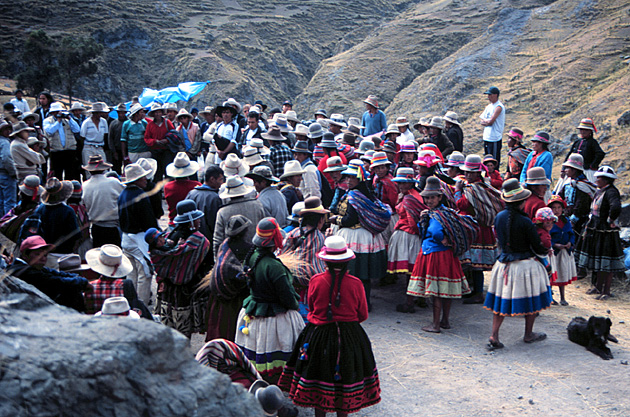
Builders gather during the renewal

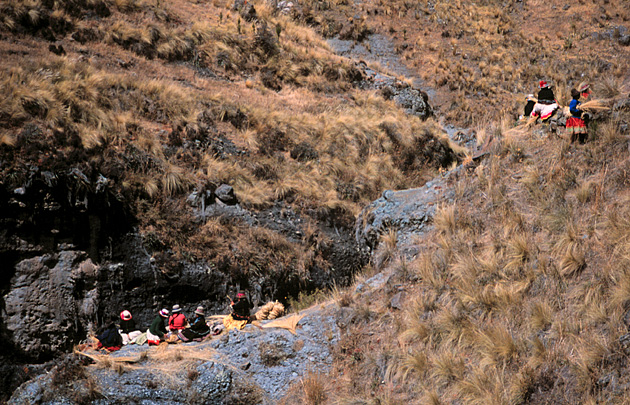
Preparing side lashings

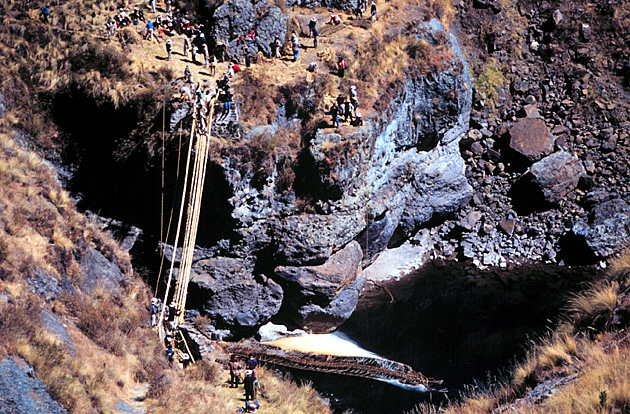
Main cable and hand-ropes are in place

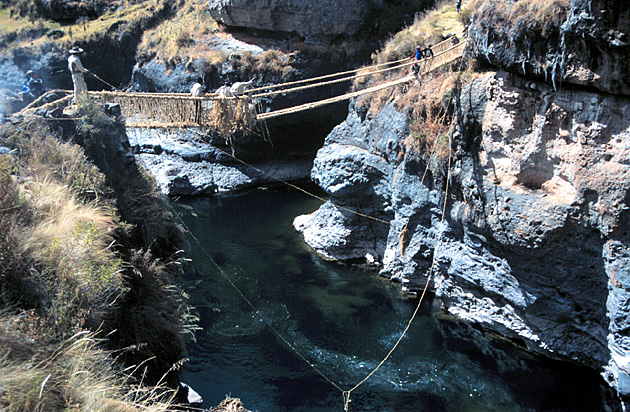
Lashing the hand-ropes to the main side cables.

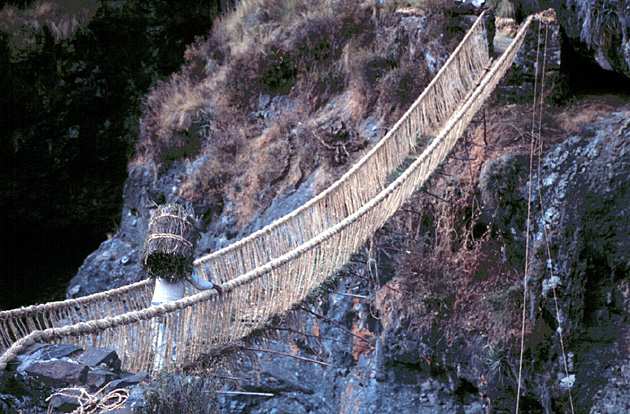
Trimmed mat rolls form the bridge deck.

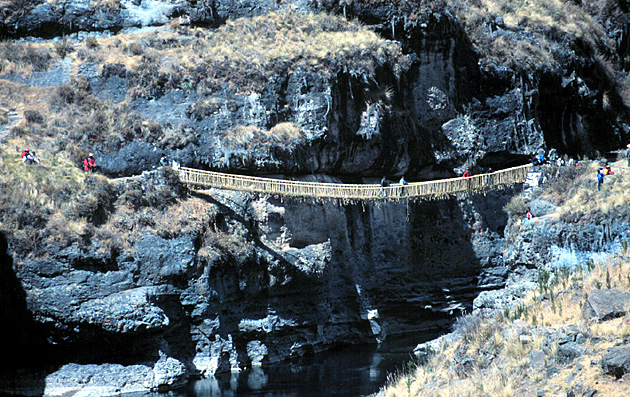
The new bridge is now complete and in use.

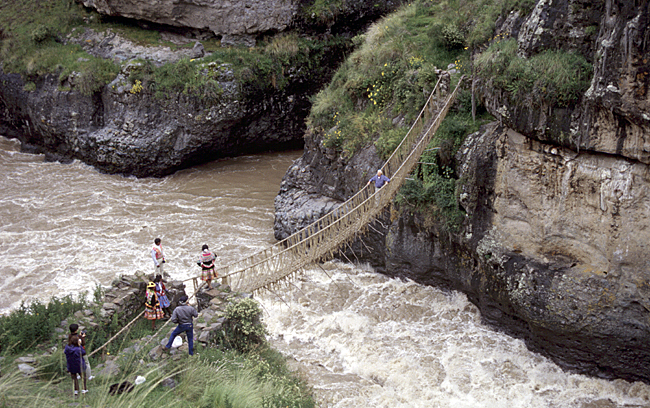
Bridge in use during the rainy season.
