= Tipón =

Archaeological park in Peru near Cusco with an Incan monumental hydraulic system

Tipón Archaeological Park
- Parque Arqueológico de Tipón
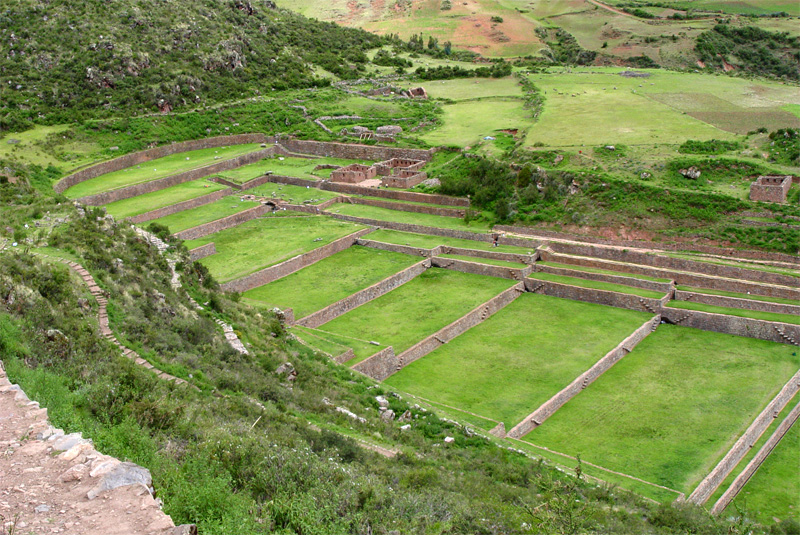
- Interactive map of Tipón Archaeological Park
- 13°34′15″S 71°46′59″W
- Cultures: Pre-Inca and Inca
- Location: Oropesa, Quispicanchi, Cusco, Peru

History
- Abandoned: No

Site notes
- Area: 239 hectares (590 acres)
- Excavation dates: 1970 - present
- Condition: Preserved
- Owner: Peruvian Government
- Management: Peruvian Ministry of Culture
- Public access: Yes

Tipón is a sprawling early fifteenth-century Inca archaeological site that is situated between 3,250 metres (10,660 ft) and 3,960 metres (12,990 ft) above sea level, located 22 kilometres (14 mi) southeast of Cusco near the village of Tipón. It consists of several ruins enclosed by a powerful defensive wall about 6 kilometres (3.7 mi) long. The most renowned (and easily accessible) part of the park is the group of precise and right angled monumental terraces irrigated by a network of water canals fed by a monumental fountain channeling water from a natural spring. The site includes ancient residential areas and a remarkable amount of petroglyphs in its upper part.

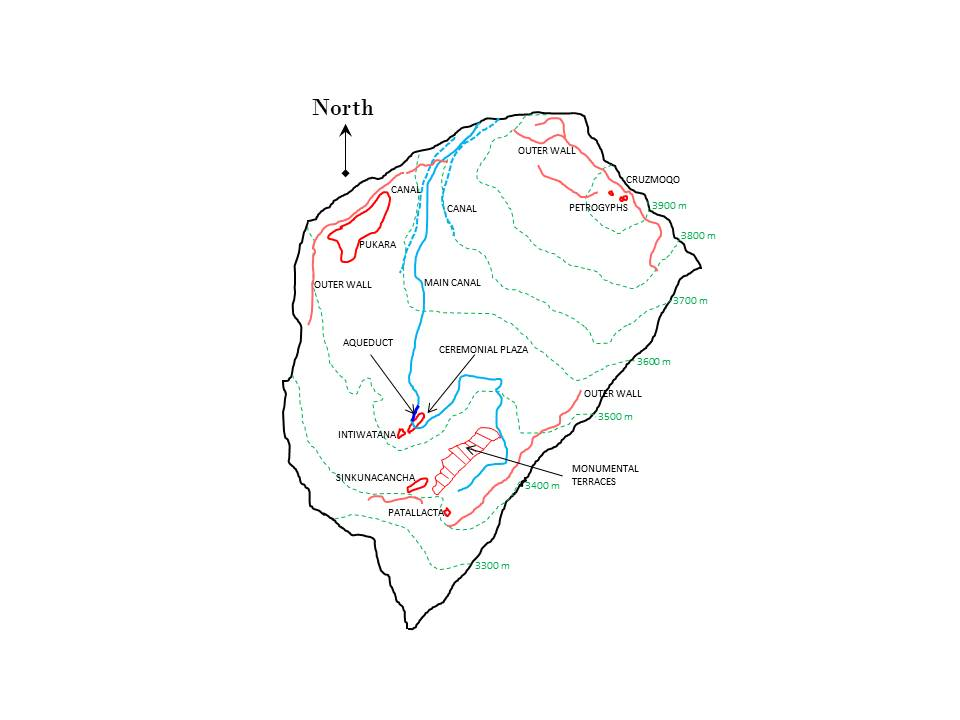
Tipón - sketch of the archaeological park

The irrigation system based on canals, fountains and stonework with water drop structures shows that the Incas had an advanced water related technology and were experienced hydraulic engineers.

Since the 1970s the area has been excavated and restored. Works are still ongoing (2021).

Most probably the Tipón complex was an imperial Inca estate or at least a sort of feudal estate for Inca elite built in the time of Pachacuti or his son, Topa Inca Yupanqui and it is supposed that also ceremonial activities took place in it. The site may have also been used as a laboratory for agricultural products because of the various micro-climates found within the complex, a reliable round-the-year water supply and the fertile soil.

Tipón is considered one of the most important archaeological tours for tourists who visit the Cusco area.

== Description ==
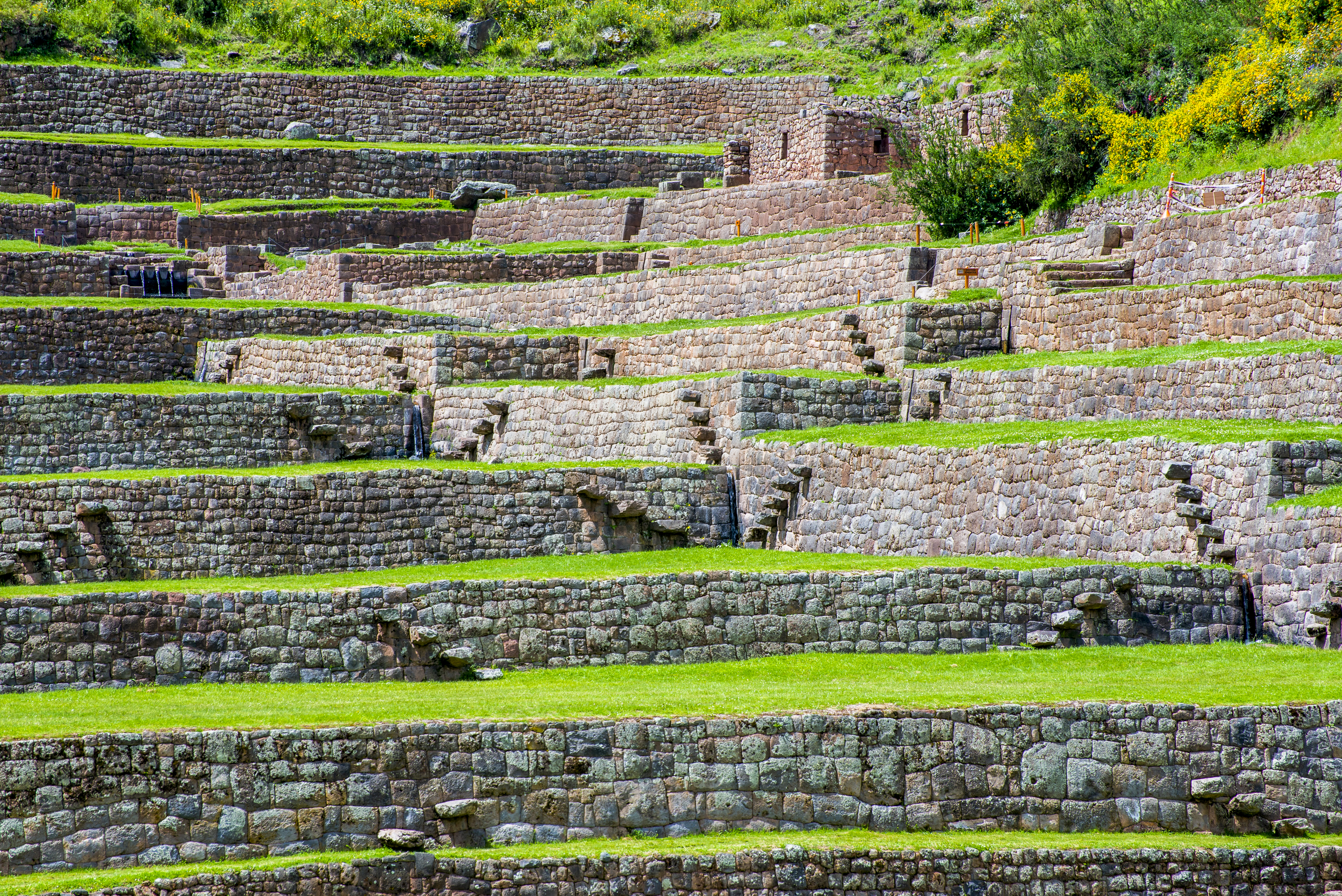
Tipón - monumental terraces

The Tipón complex is located near Oropesa in the Community of Choquepata, Quispicanchi Province, southeast of Cusco, along the Cusco-Puno road.

It was divided, by archaeologists, into agricultural and urban sectors (among them Pukara, Intihuatana and Sinkunakancha); ceremonial centers (Cruzmoqo, Intiwatana, fountains); Qullqas -meaning deposit, storehouse- (Iglesia Raqui) and cemeteries. The upper part of the Tipón complex is crossed by three Inca canals that divert the waters of the Pukara river and feed it for the cultivation of the entire complex; one of them flows on top of an intact stone aqueduct.

In 1984 Tipón was declared a National Archaeological Park of Peru and in 2006 was put on the List of Historic Civil Engineering Landmarks by the American Society of Civil Engineers. It covers an area of 239 hectares (590 acres) and is delimited by two ravines with streams flowing in them, which converge at the foot of the archaeological complex and flow into the left bank of the Huatanay river.

Tipón is located in a volcanic area. The material used by the Incas for the construction of the terraces and enclosures was basalt and andesite finely worked or partly worked according to local needs.

=== Etymology ===
The etymology of the name Tipón is unknown. It is not a Quechua term, but it may be derived from timpuee ("boiling place"), because it could have been "boiling" due to the large number of people or it could have been a place of great concentration of activities in Inca times. In any case, this toponym cannot yet be explained satisfactorily.

== History ==
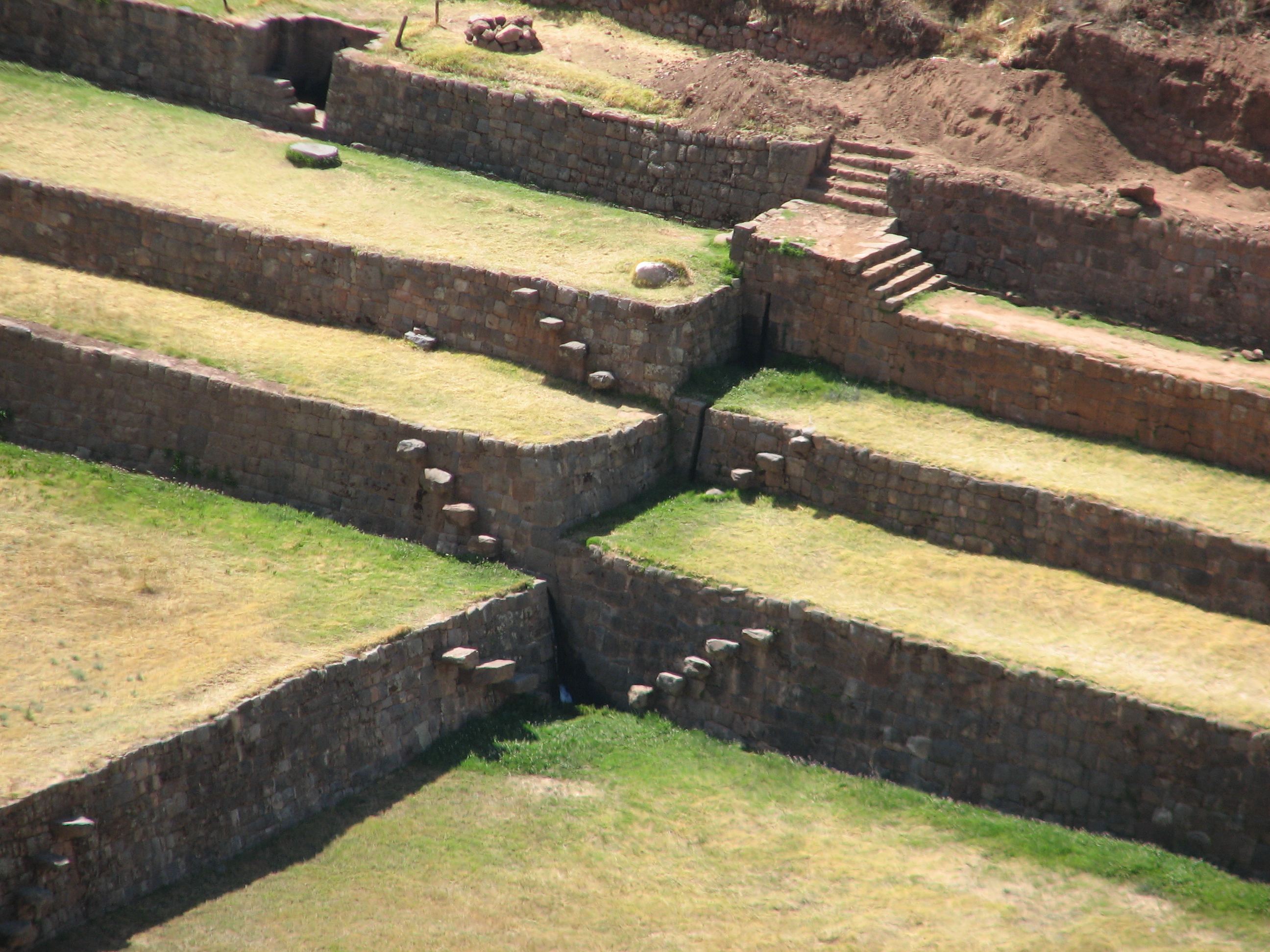
Tipón - view of retaining walls with stepping stones

The reports of the archaeological works conclude that the site was continuously occupied from the Formative stage, by the Marcavalle culture, around 1000 BCE, through the Chanapata (800 BCE), Qotakalli (700 CE), Huari (700 CE to 1200 CE) and Killke (900 to 1200 CE), until the Inca period (13th century to 1572). The artifacts found on site show that Tipón was an important ceremonial, administrative and religious center during Inca times. The Cruzmoqo hill, on top of the Tipón complex, is supposed to have been a very important signal point, communications and observation station along the road to the Vilcanota/Urubamba Sacred Valley. Tipón (whose original name was Muyna or Moyna) was, a very important settlement of the pre-Inca tribe of the Pinagua, finally becoming an Inca llaqta (administrative settlement). The Pinaguas may have been part of the Ayarmaca kingdom whose uprising against the Inca rule is known to have occurred during the reigns of Inca Roca and Viracocha Inca, having been definitively subdued by Pachacuti, in the middle of the 15th century.

According to the historian Víctor Angles Vargas interpreting a passage from the chronicle of the Comentarios Reales de los Incas by Garcilaso de la Vega, Tipón was built by Viracocha Inca as a residence and refuge for his father Yawar Waqaq, who was overthrown for escaping during a rebellion of the Chankas. Garcilaso mentions that, by mutual agreement, in order to avoid a civil war, father and son «...drew up a royal house, between the narrow area of Muyna and Quespicancha, in a pleasant place … with all the gifts and delights that could be imagined». Nevertheless, subsequent studies and later interpretations have made it clear that it was the elder Viracocha who fled before the arrival of the Chankas, not to this place but to the Sacred Valley while confirming a close relationship of Yawar Waqaq with the Tipón site.

The name Tipón appears for the first time in the will of Doña Tomasina de la Vega, one of the first owners of the Quispicanchi estate in the 16th century and widow of a Don Griego, mentioning the «lands of Tipón and Guaypar» and of «some lands within old enclosures».

== Archaeological Park ==
Tipón - monumental terraces with a canal and Iglesia Raqui on the top right

Tipon is hydrologically remarkable because of the combined use of both surface water and groundwater in a balanced, logical manner, even when measured by modern engineering standards. While Tipon's water works are much different than those at Machu Picchu, the similarity of technical principles employed at the two sites demonstrates that common technology transfer took place between these two separated locations. For instance, stone-lined canals, vertical drains or drops, and spring water collection headworks at both locations show similar technology, even though details differ. Land stewardship at both locations is evident. The engineers at both Machu Picchu and Tipon exhibited knowledge of the relationships between hydraulic slope, canal cross sectional area, hydraulic roughness, and resulting flow capacity. Tipon's ceremonial fountain shares fundamental similarities with the numerous fountains of Machu Picchu and Wiñay Wayna.

— Kenneth Wright et Al, Tipon Water Engineering Masterpiece of the Inca Empire

The main areas of interest within the Tipón archaeological park are the following.

=== Terraces ===
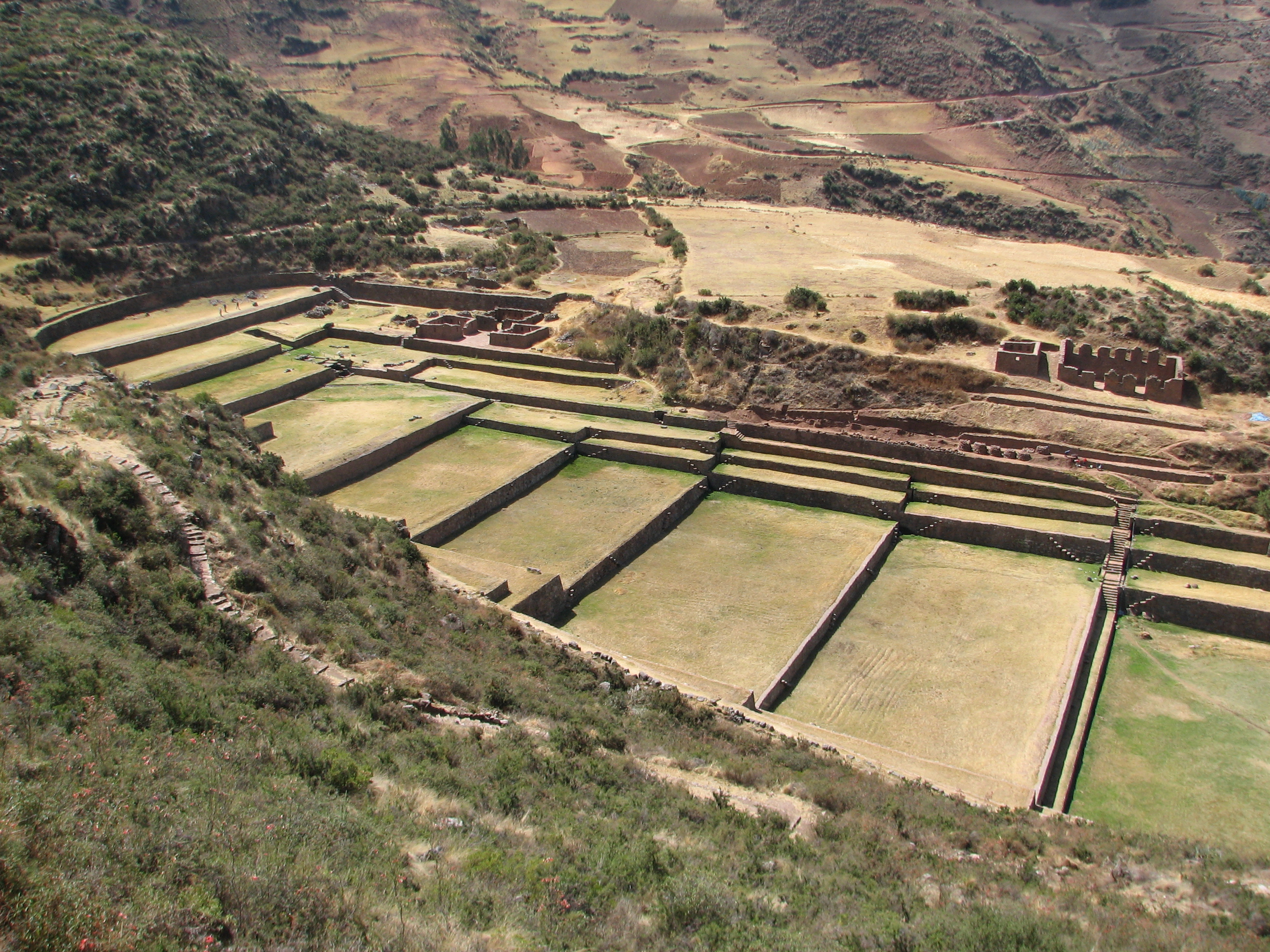
Tipón - general view of the monumental terraces

The terraced areas ("andénes") within the Park cover a large proportion of the total area within the defense walls. The terraces represent about 100 hectares (250 acres) and some 50 hectares (120 acres) lie below one or more of the surface water irrigation canals that divert from the Pukara river. The terraces are formed by stone walls, many of which are in a poor state of preservation.

=== Monumental terraces ===
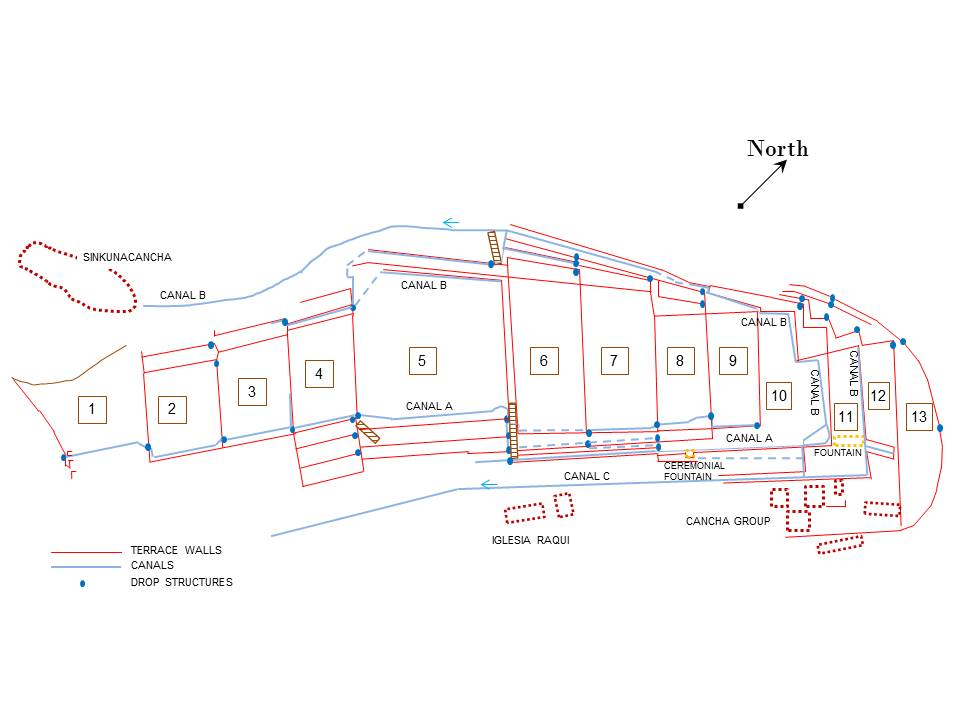
Tipón - sketch of monumental terraces

The 13 main terraces (covering an area of approximately 3 hectares (7.4 acres)) are located in the southern part of the Archaeological Park in a shallow ravine that has a north-east to south-west orientation and range in elevation from 3,380 metres (11,090 ft) to 3,460 metres (11,350 ft) meters.

They are characterized by U-shaped walling. The masonry is of high class, as evidenced by the careful shaping and fitting. Just a few sectors present walls with types of rustic rig. The walls range in height from 1 metre (3.3 ft) to 5 metres (16 ft) meters, with an average height of 2.5 metres (8.2 ft) to 3 metres (9.8 ft) meters.

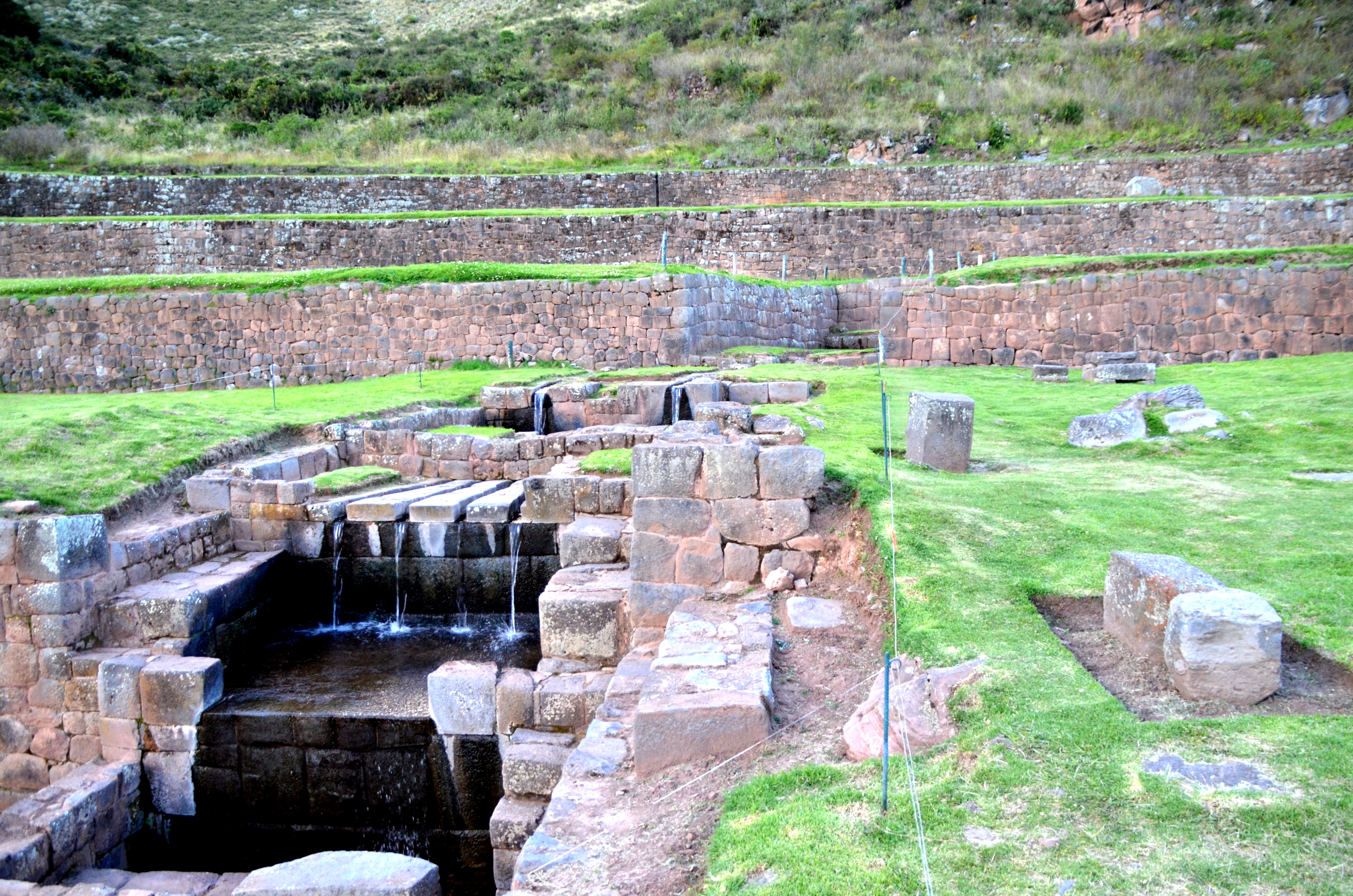
Tipón - monumental fountain (see how the water flow is split and then joined again)

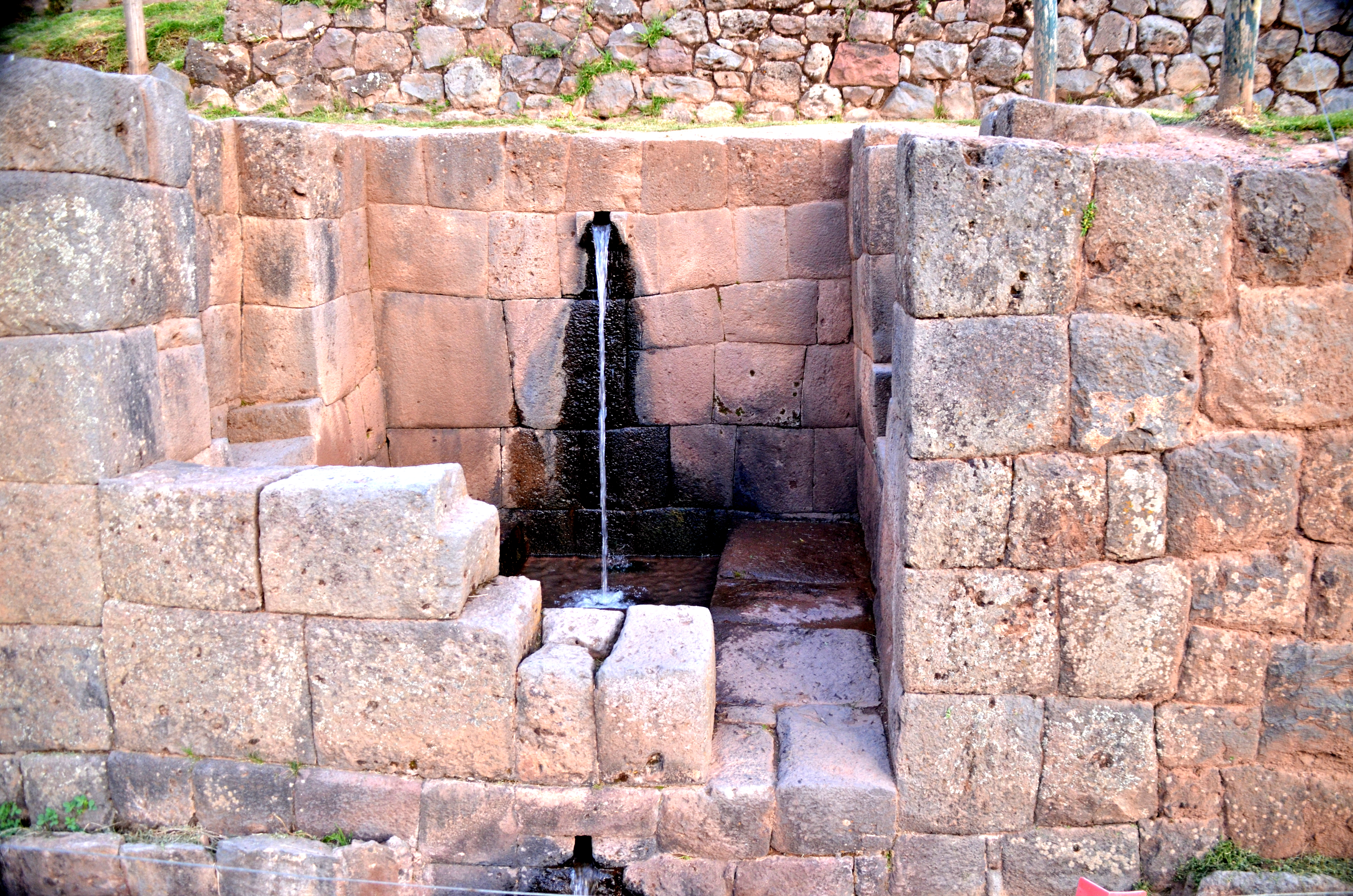
Tipón - ceremonial fountain

The irrigation systems of these terraces constitutes a spectacular example of pre-Columbian civil engineering technology with a monumental fountain on the topmost terrace collecting the ground water into a system of three canals that can be operated independently or jointly, drop structures granting a controlled flow of water for agricultural purposes and providing also, through accurate branching, water to the nearby residential areas of Sinkunakancha and Patallaqta. Of the 13 terraces, 11 are irrigated by water from the monumental Tipon spring while the upper two are irrigated from the main canal from the Pukara river.

=== Fountains ===
The main monumental fountain, restored in 1999, is located on terrace 11 where a natural spring is collected, channeled and divided in two jets which again divide to form four jets, which eventually join in a single flow becoming the head of the canal work. It has a stable year-long flow of high quality water. The ground water collection system is made of seven underground conduits extending outwards in different directions. The fountains structure has an outstanding design of stonework of basalt and andesite. Before it was divided into four jets there was a western and eastern channel. The western channels was able to reach the monumental terraces and eastern channel went across the elite housing.

A ceremonial fountain is situated on the south east side of terrace 8. Its water is supplied by one of the canals fed by the monumental fountain which runs underground before feeding the fountain: the water jet drops to a stone basin, after which the water is discharged to the lower canal system.

=== Outer wall ===
An important feature of Tipón is the massive outer wall that encircles the site making it a sort of fortress. The wall is about 6 kilometres (3.7 mi) long with a maximum height of about 8 metres (26 ft) its width is up to 2 metres (6.6 ft) at the top and 4 to 6 metres (13 to 20 ft) at the bottom. The construction of the wall was carried out with a large use of resources and its aspect tends to indicate a Killke or Wari influence. The masonry is simple: stone elements do not have a good alignment, but there are sectors where the face of the wall tends to be polygonal. In its longitudinal section, the wall has a stepped shape following the topography of the hill. Part of the wall built on top of the natural rocky slope . Its original purpose is unknown and needs further research. In the northeast portion of the Tipón site the wall has a hole or doorway structure whose use is not known.

=== Inca canals and aqueduct ===
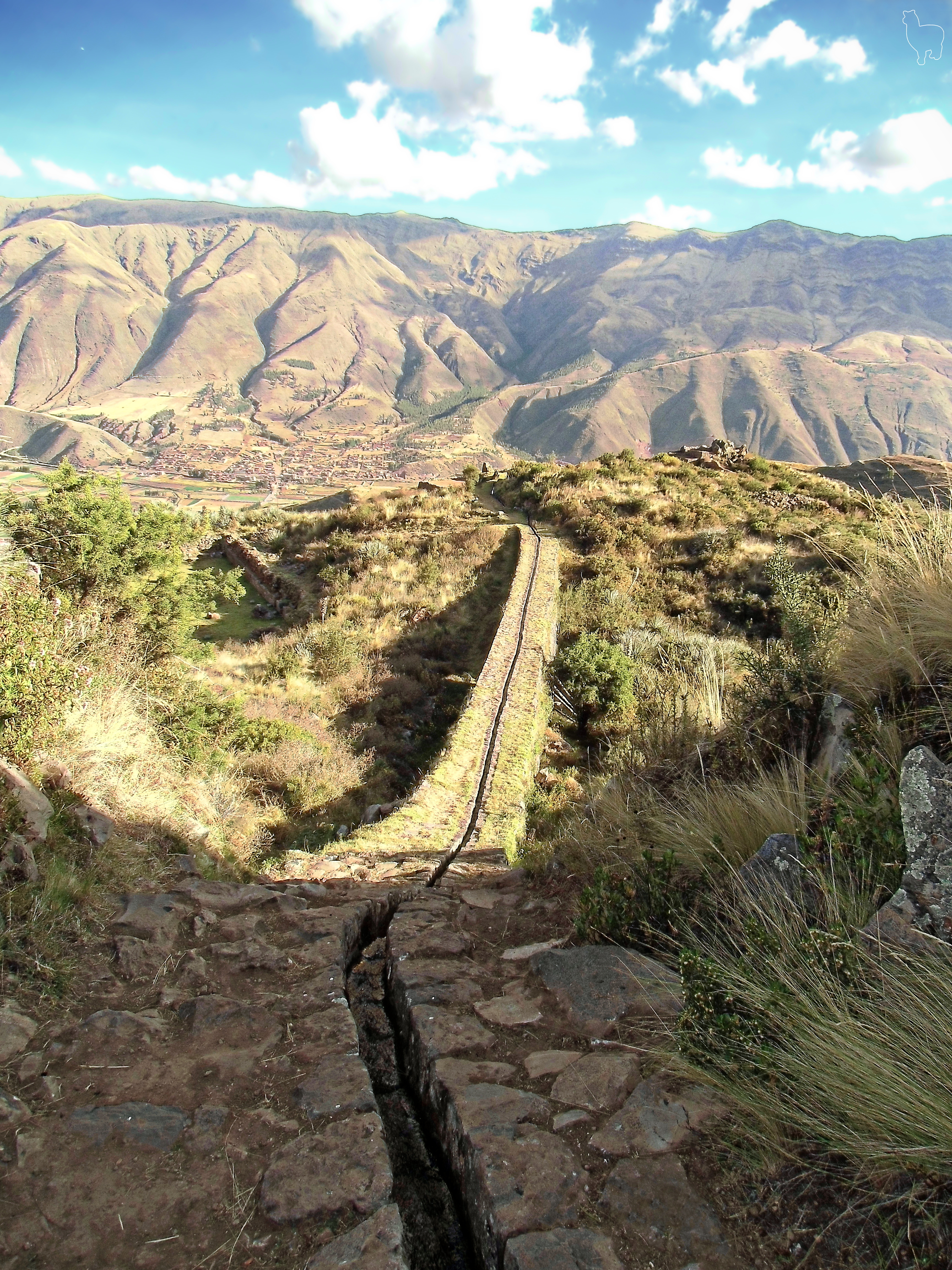
Tipón - aqueduct north of Intiwatana

Three irrigation canals collect water from the Pukara river on the northmost tip of the Archaeological Park at an elevation of about 3,790 metres (12,430 ft) and divert it to the lower lying land and dwellings. The diversion points are outside the outer wall; the canals pass through it at places where the steep topography allows for a good security of the wall. One of the canals designated as the main canal has been restored or is well preserved on most of its 1.4 kilometres (0.87 mi) stone-lined route. Its route, while tending to follow the contour lines of the hill, passes different slope grades and is built with different techniques including retaining walls, cut and fill sections and sharp bends to change direction or avoid a rock. This canal provides irrigation to the agricultural area near the Intiwatana and Ceremonial plaza and then passing north of the monumental terraces reaches Patallaqta. Before Intiwatana the canal flows on top of an aqueduct and crosses the Intiwatana compound through a tunnel. Just north of intiwatana an aqueduct was built on the rocky outcrop, taking advantage of the rocky promontories for the design and projection of the channel, in this case a large structure was built, until reaching such a level as to allow the water to flow to Intiwatana.

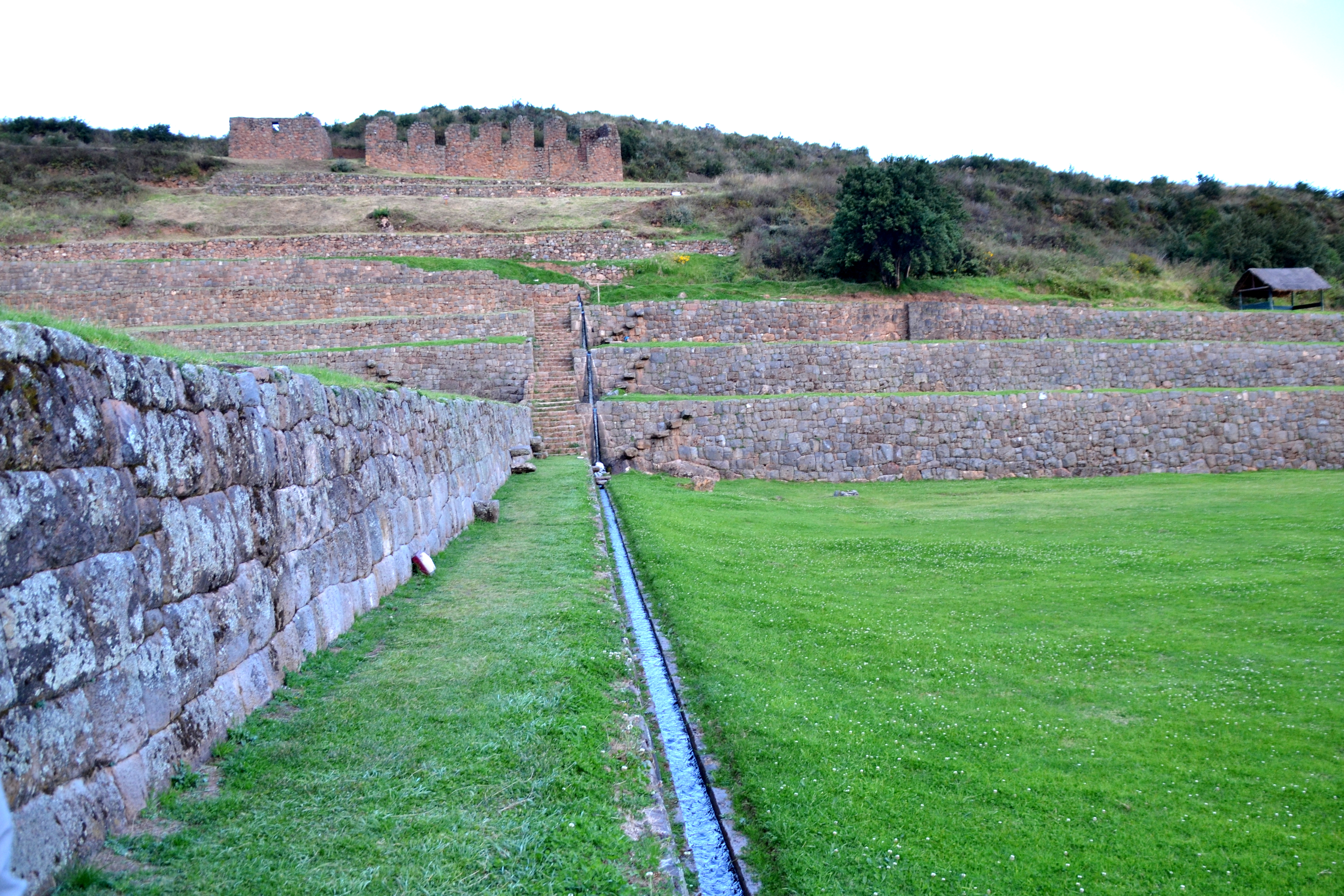
Tipón - grand stairway and Iglesia Raqui at the top

=== Cancha Inca ===
This group of buildings is found east to monumental terrace 12 near the monumental fountain spring. It is a small urban group (Inca court), the spatial distribution of the buildings, that conserve trapezoidal niches and windows, is in the shape of a "U" with a central patio.

=== Iglesia Raqui ===
To the east of terrace 6, lies a restored building that may be a qullqa with doorways, windows, and niches The structures are such as to have plenty of air circulation, one of the larger rooms has a rectangular shape with three trapezoidal access openings at the first level, while the second level has six openings through the rear part, facing north.

Iglesia Raqui that lies at the top of the grand stairway built on the south west side of the monumental terraces and flanked by a 3 steps water drop constitutes an important part of the scenic view of Tipón terraces.

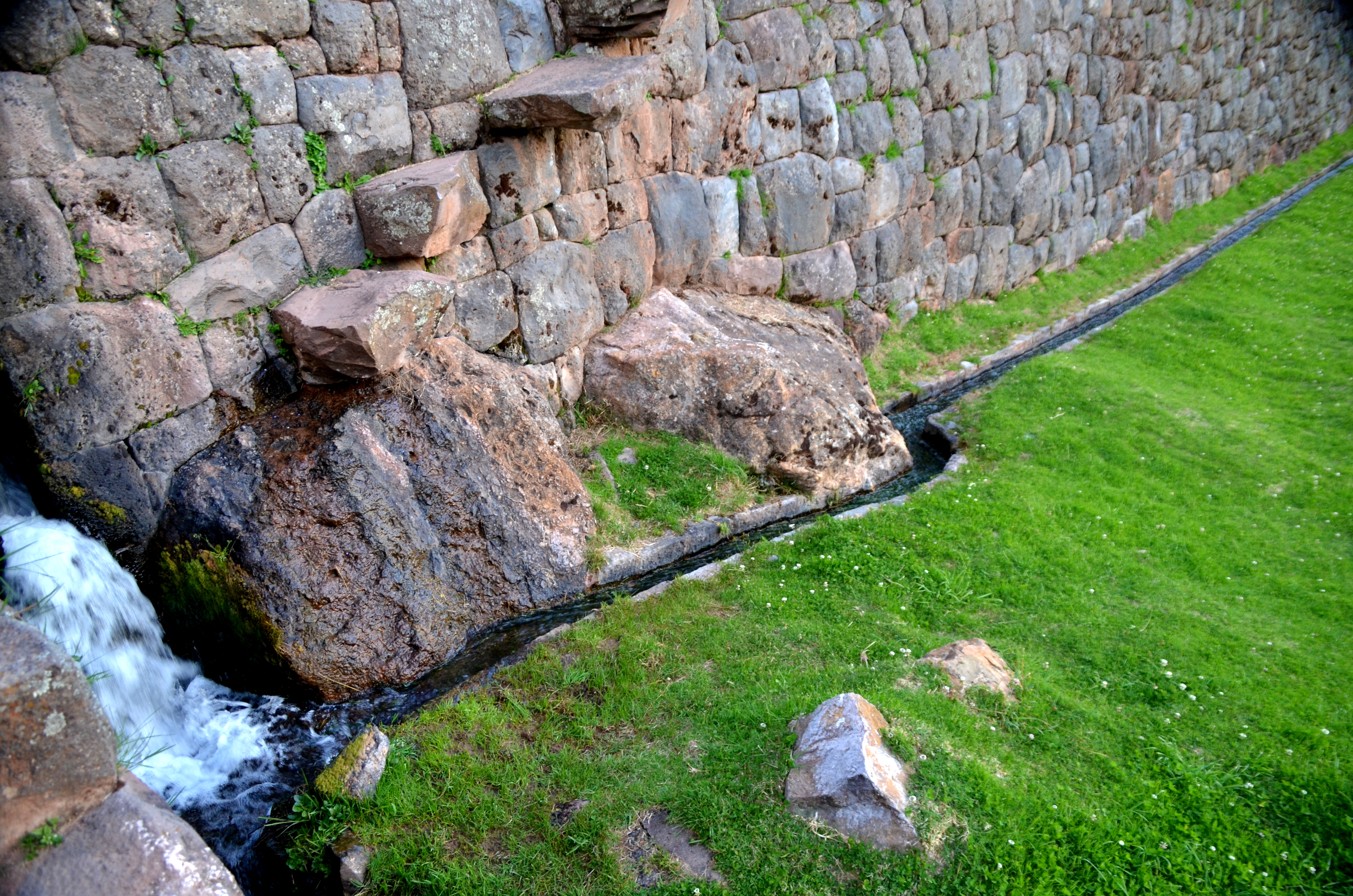
Tipón - canal sharp change of direction to skirt a stone

=== Sinkuna cancha ===
This residential area is situated just above monumental terrace 1 and has an east–west length of about 90 metres (300 ft) with a massive half-circular structure on the east. It is composed of a set of enclosures whose main characteristic is their integration with nature: terraces have been created that follow the topography of the land, by cut and fill with retaining walls where necessary. The enclosures do not follow the classic set up of Inca canchas where three or more buildings group up around a central patio but have a free disposition. More excavations are necessary to have an insight of the complex.

=== Intiwatana ===
Intiwatana means where the sun is tied or mooring of the sun and was a solar observer where solstices and equinoxes were observed for agricultural control. The Incas needed to "tie up the sun", so it would not "run away" after the solstice, when it is the farthest away from the earth. The name was given by Ephrain Squier in 1877 and confirmed by Hiram Bingham III in 1913. This sector is located on the rocky promontory of the same name at an elevation of 3,525 metres (11,565 ft). At the east end of the ruin is a small, natural truncated pyramid capped by rocks around which four square terraces and a stairway were built with simple masonry. Facing the pyramid is a patio with two triple-jamb niches. To the west of the pyramid a longitudinal street divides two spaces where rectangular rooms are found with opening facing the pyramid. They have trapezoidal niches and the masonry is fine. The main canal enters Intiwatana and leaves it after passing underground and making a water supply available to the residents. The canal was incorporated into the foundations of the buildings. This buildings constitute an urban sub-sector of a large agricultural complex with irrigated Inca terraces, many of which are still used for agricultural purposes. Not only did the incorporations of the canals serve a purpose in agriculture but it was first contributing to 4 baths and eventually reaching the fountains and sprouts.

=== Ceremonial plaza ===
The U-shaped Ceremonial plaza is found just south-west of the aqueduct with its opening towards the south. It is about 35 by 23 metres (115 by 75 ft) The andesite stonework is excellent. In its northern side the wall includes big trapezoidal niches Two water distribution canals that come from the aqueduct, feed water to the plaza. The northeastern one pours water into the internal part of a small enclosure, possibly a ceremonial fountain.

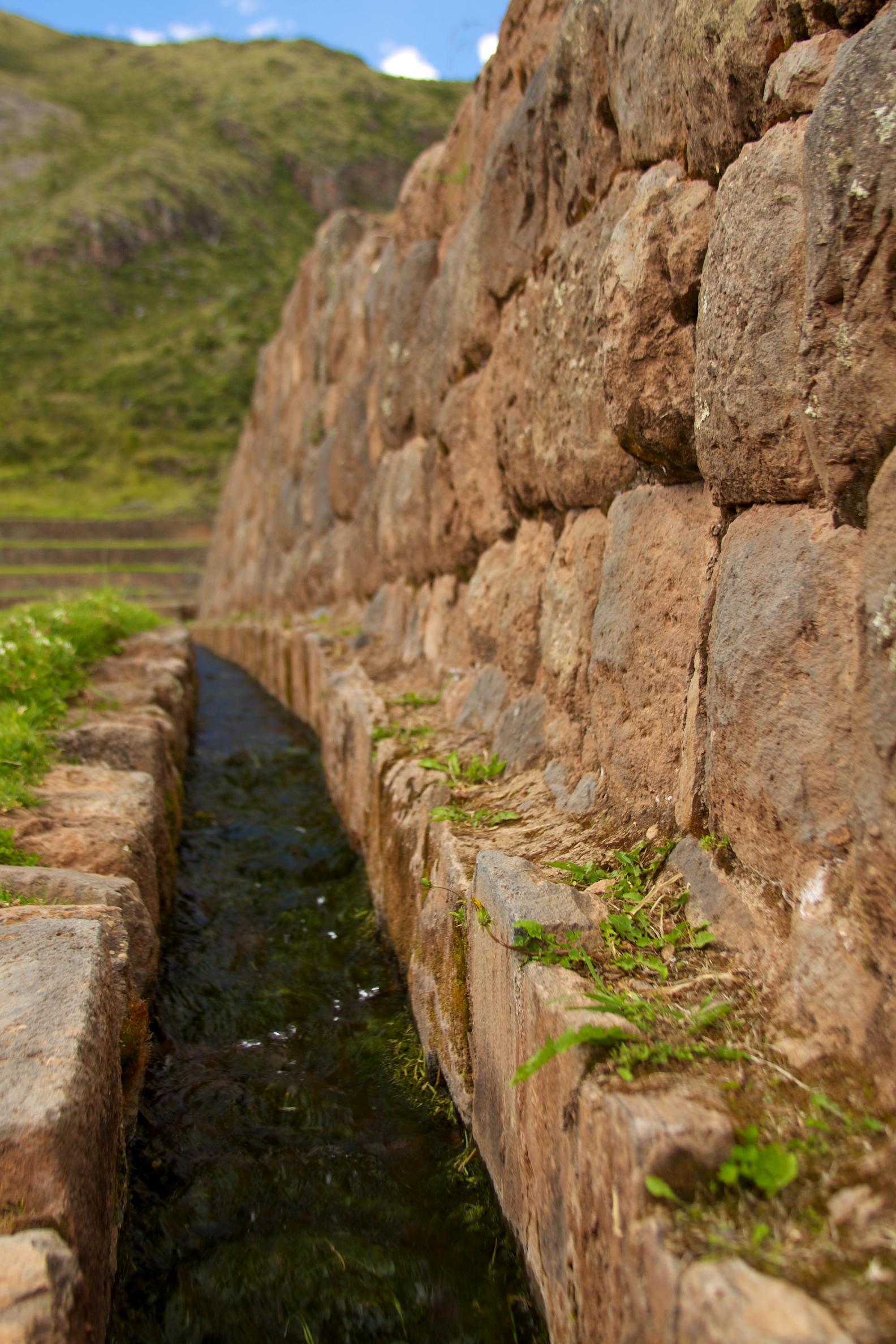
Tipón - detail of a canal and a retaining wall on the monumental terraces

=== Cruzmoqo ===
Cruz Moqo is the highest point of Tipón Archaeological Park at an elevation of 3,960 metres (12,990 ft) and contains important petroglyphs. The outer wall encloses the tip of Cruzmoqo which may indicate a religious or signaling use. Terraces around Cruzmoqo are built with square and rectangular fine cut stones. Several natural rocks are engraved with geometric shapes: double (mirrored) spirals, arrows, lines of dots and small cavities. Cruzmoqo hosts the majority of the 29 rocks and stones with petroglyphs found in the Tipón Park. Their style is quite different from that of the petroglyphs found on the southern slope of the Park which include also zoomorphic and anthropomorphic figures. The summit petroglyphs show different degree of erosion which may account for their engraving at different times.

=== Pukara ===
The Inca urban area of Pukara, which consist of buildings and stone terraces, lies inside of and close to the northwest outer wall adjacent to the Pukara river. The presence of Killke potsherds shows its pre-Inca origin. The site area has likely been continuously farmed since the Inca period. The urban sector is mostly made of enclosures made of simple masonry, the polygonal masonry is more frequent in the corners, the openings are trapezoidal, the interior part of the enclosures was plastered with clay and straw mortar.

The terraces are characterized by having rectangular shapes in the north and east parts, while in the southeast part they have a crescent shape due to the morphology of the land. These terraces are currently used by local farmers.

== See also ==
- List of archaeological sites in Peru
- Machu Picchu
- Moray
- Wiñay Wayna
