= Avignonet =

- Commune
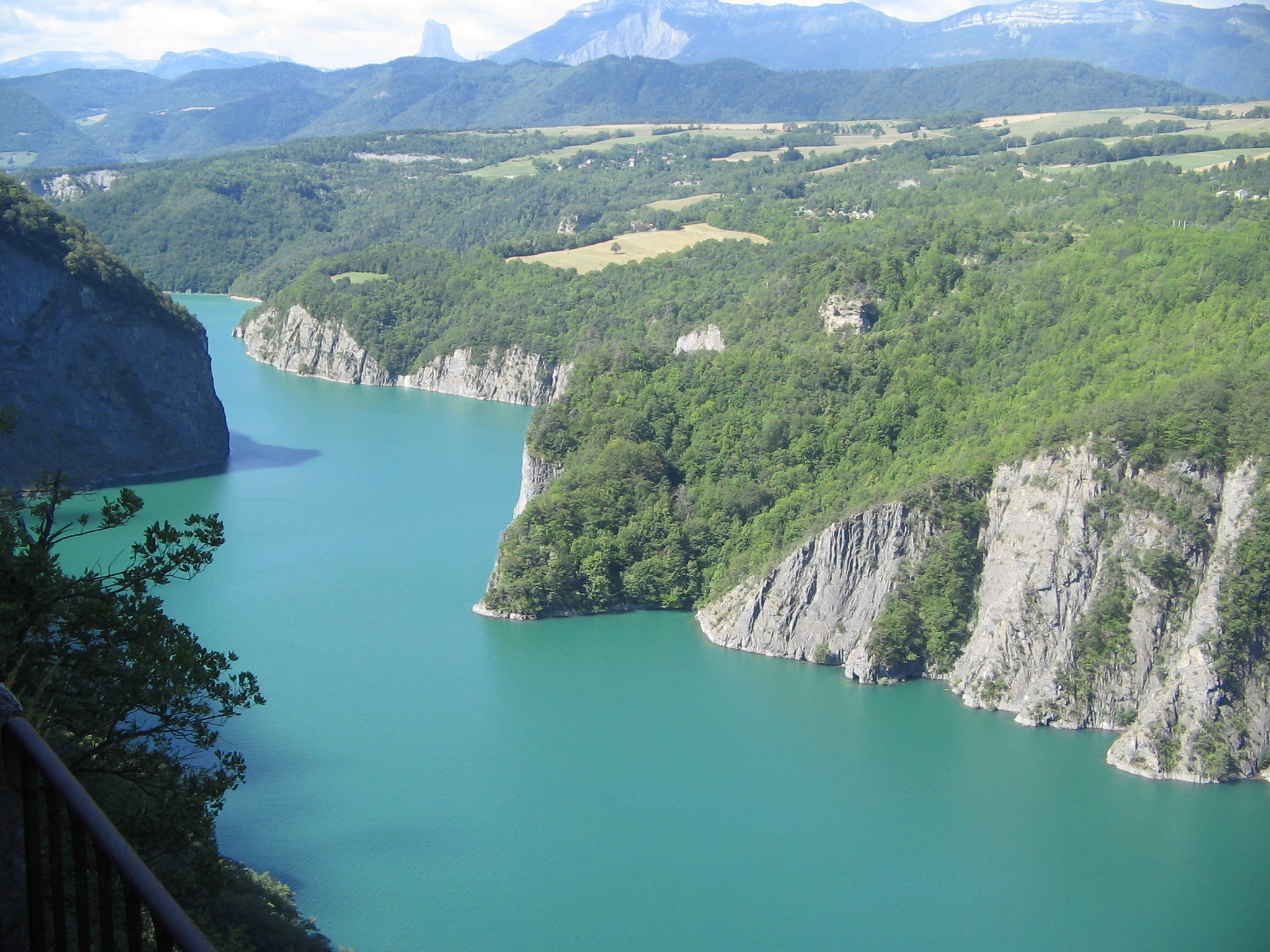
- Monteynard Lake on the border with Monteynard
- Location of Avignonet
- Location within France Location within Auvergne-Rhône-Alpes
- Coordinates: 44°57′35″N 5°39′28″E
- Country: France
- Region: Auvergne-Rhône-Alpes
- Department: Isère
- Arrondissement: Grenoble
- Canton: Matheysine-Trièves
- Intercommunality: CC Trièves

Government
  - Mayor (2020–2026): Jérôme Fauconnier
- Area^{1}: 8 km^{2} (3.1 sq mi)
- Highest elevation: 825 m (2,707 ft)
- Lowest elevation: 362 m (1,188 ft)
- Population (2023): 203
  - Density: 25/km^{2} (66/sq mi)
- Time zone: UTC+01:00 (CET)
  - Summer (DST): UTC+02:00 (CEST)
- INSEE/Postal code: 38023 /38650
- ^{1} French Land Register data, which excludes lakes, ponds, glaciers > 1 km^{2} (0.386 sq mi or 247 acres) and river estuaries.

Avignonet (French pronunciation: [aviɲɔnɛ]) is a commune in the Isère department in the Auvergne-Rhône-Alpes region of south-eastern France.

== Geography ==
Avignonet is located some 25 km south of Grenoble and 8 km north of Monestier-de-Clermont. Access to the commune is by the A51 autoroute (E712) which passes south through the western arm of the commune and has Exit 13 Sinard on the commune border. Access to the village is by road D110A from Saint-Martin-de-la-Cluze in the north which comes down the western border of the commune to the village. The D110C goes east from Sinard to the dam through the south of the commune. Avignonet station has rail connections to Toulouse, Carcassonne and Narbonne. Apart from the village there are the hamlets of Le Cros and Le Mas in the south-east. There are large forests in the east of the commune with the rest of the commune farmland.

The eastern border of the commune is entirely formed by the Drac river and the large artificial Monteynard lake formed by the dam on the Drac river. Several streams rise in the commune and flow east to the lake including the Ruisseau d'Aiguettas, the Ruisseau de Mitraire, the Ruisseau de la Proche, and the Ruisseau des Vaux which forms part of the northern border.

== Administration ==
List of Successive Mayors

From	To	Name
2001	2007	Camille Chatelard
2007	2026	Jérôme Fauconnier

== Demography ==
The inhabitants of the commune are known as Avignonetins or Avignonetines in French. In 1962 its population peaked at 951, which was due to construction workers for the Lac de Monteynard-Avignonet reservoir.

Historical population

Year	Pop.	±% p.a.
1793	281	—
1821	280	−0.01%
1846	259	−0.31%
1872	280	+0.30%
1901	376	+1.02%
1921	136	−4.96%
1936	129	−0.35%
1946	110	−1.58%
1954	112	+0.23%
1962	951	+30.65%

Year	Pop.	±% p.a.
1968	102	−31.07%
1975	87	−2.25%
1982	132	+6.14%
1990	146	+1.27%
1999	189	+2.91%
2007	222	+2.03%
2012	203	−1.77%
2017	197	−0.60%
2023	203	+0.50%

Source: EHESS and INSEE

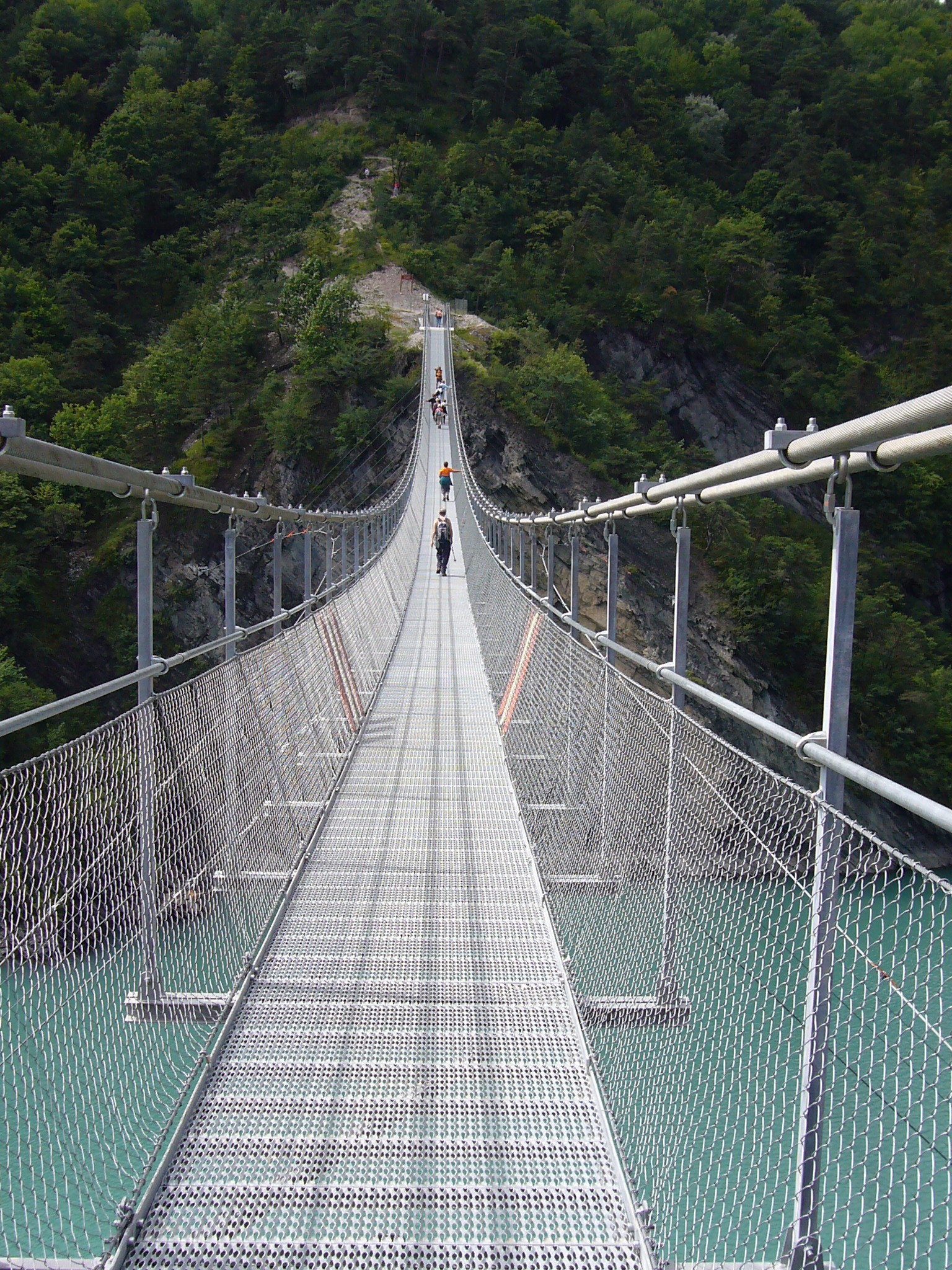
Footbridge over the Drac

== Culture and heritage ==
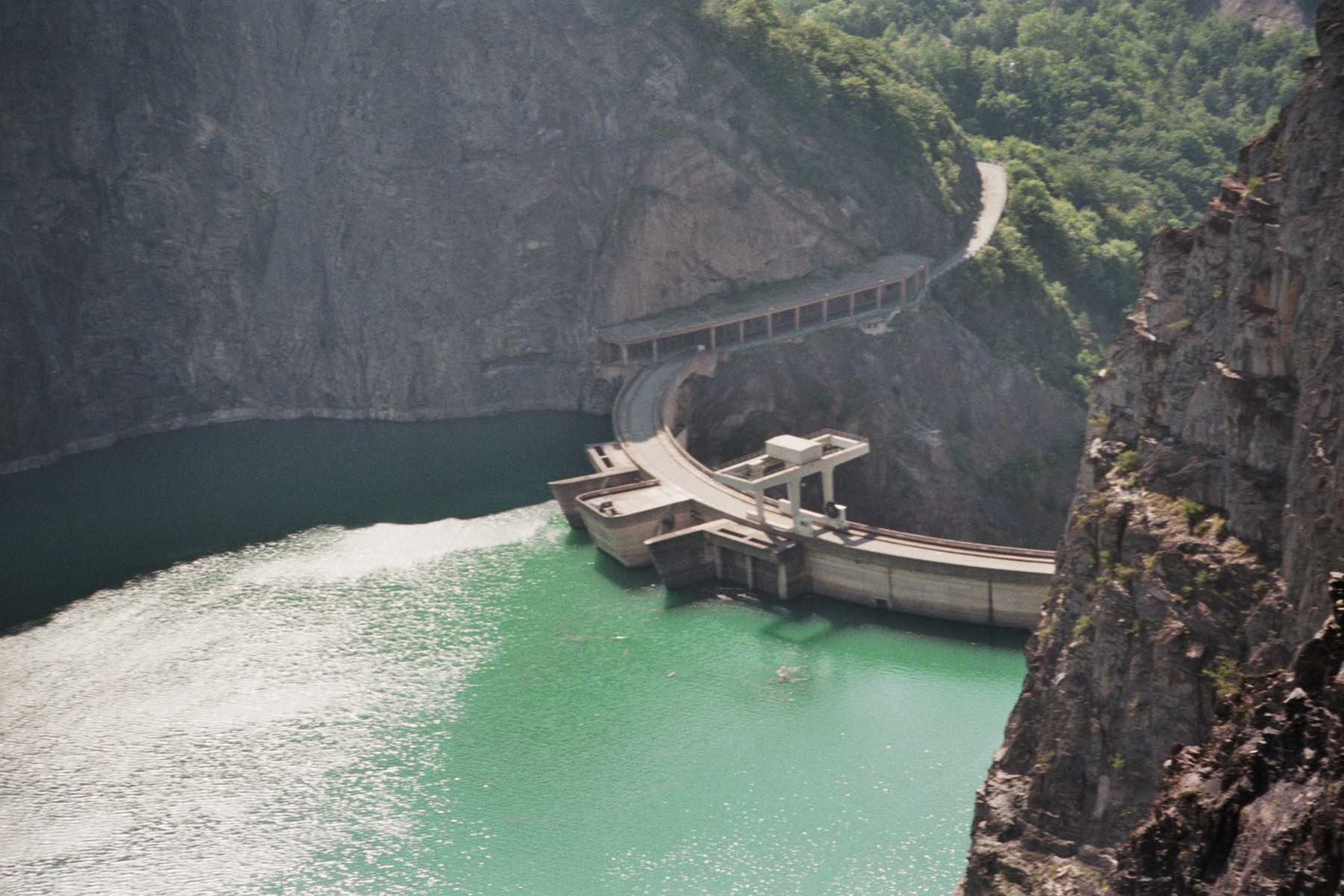
The Dam across the Drac

=== Civil heritage ===
- The Lac de Monteynard-Avignonet with its Dam and Hydro-electricity plant.
- Ruins of the Chateau d'Ars
- The Chateau des marceaux from the 17th century

Former Chateaux

- Chateau La Cluse
- Chateau des seigneurs du Gua
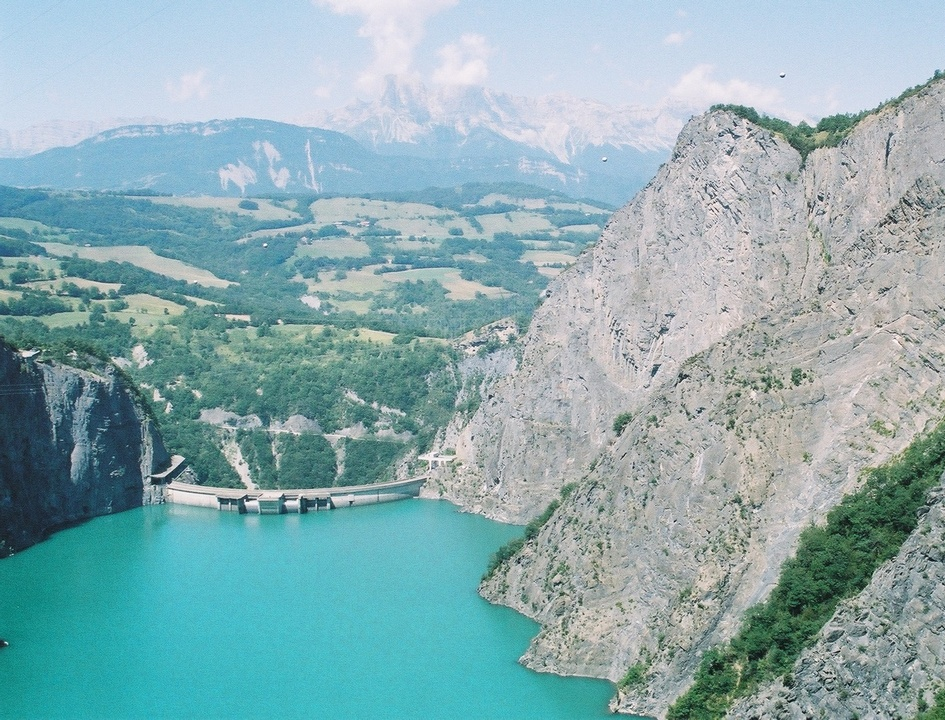
View from the lake

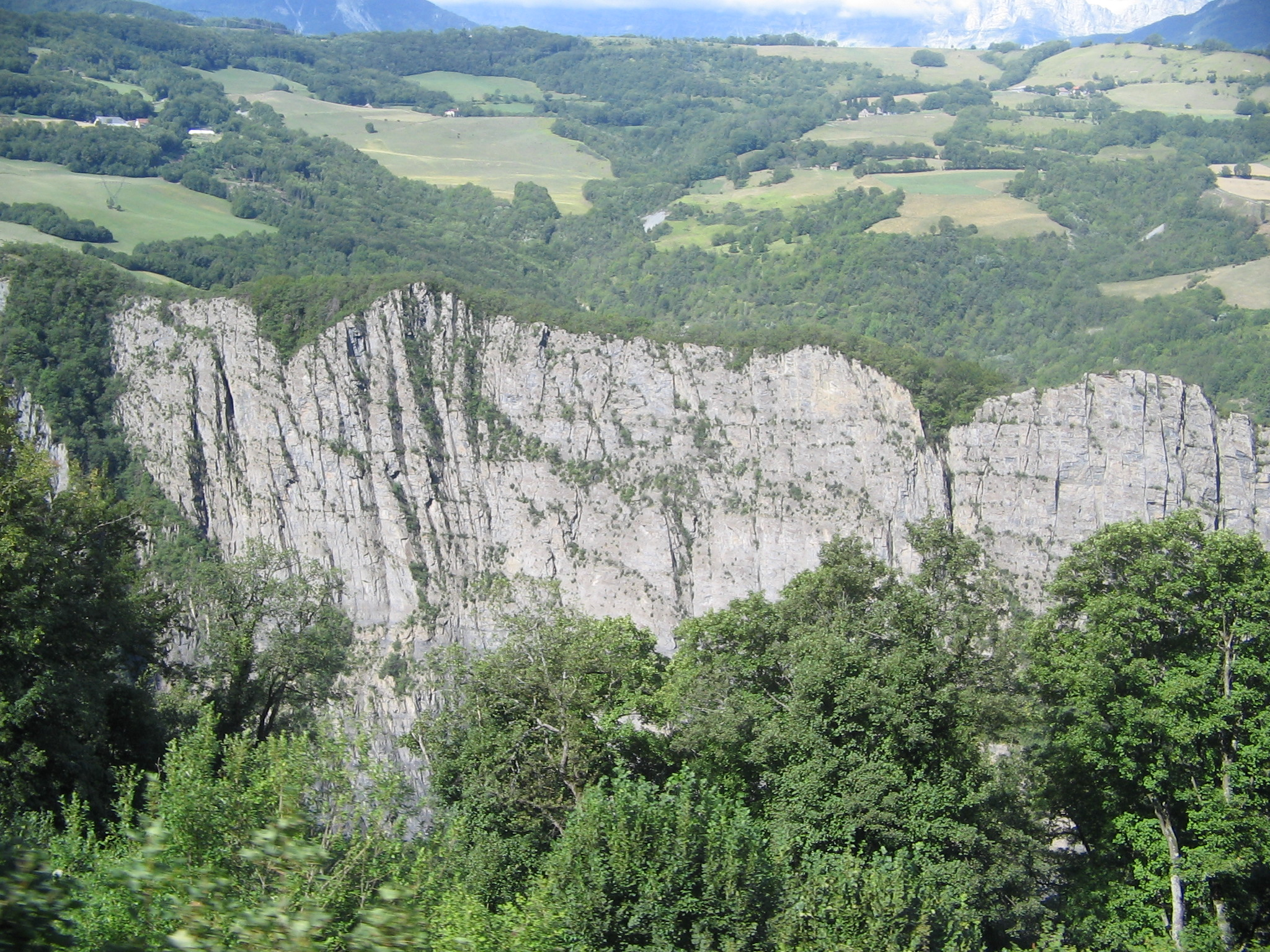
Escarpment on the lake

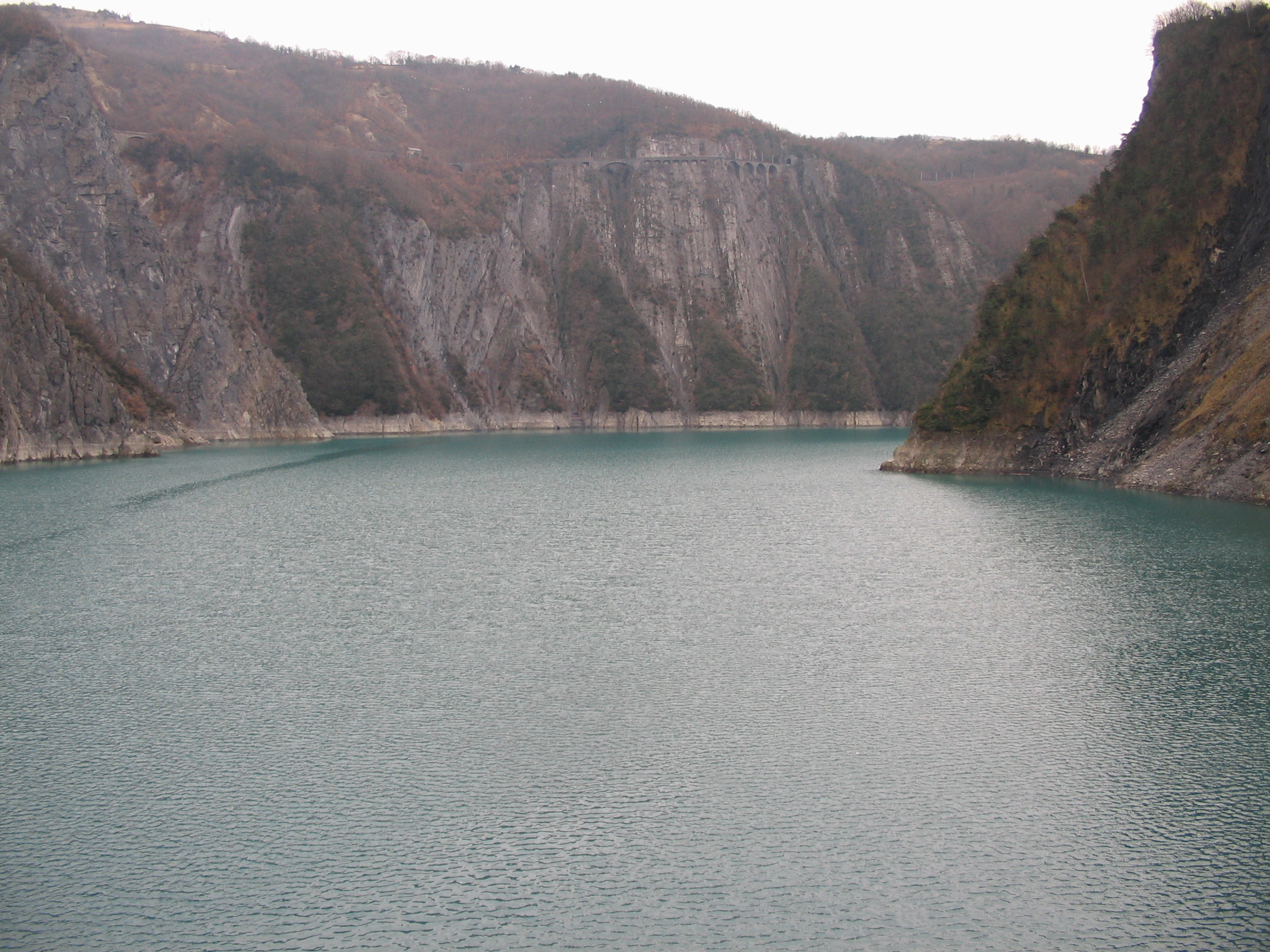
View of the lake

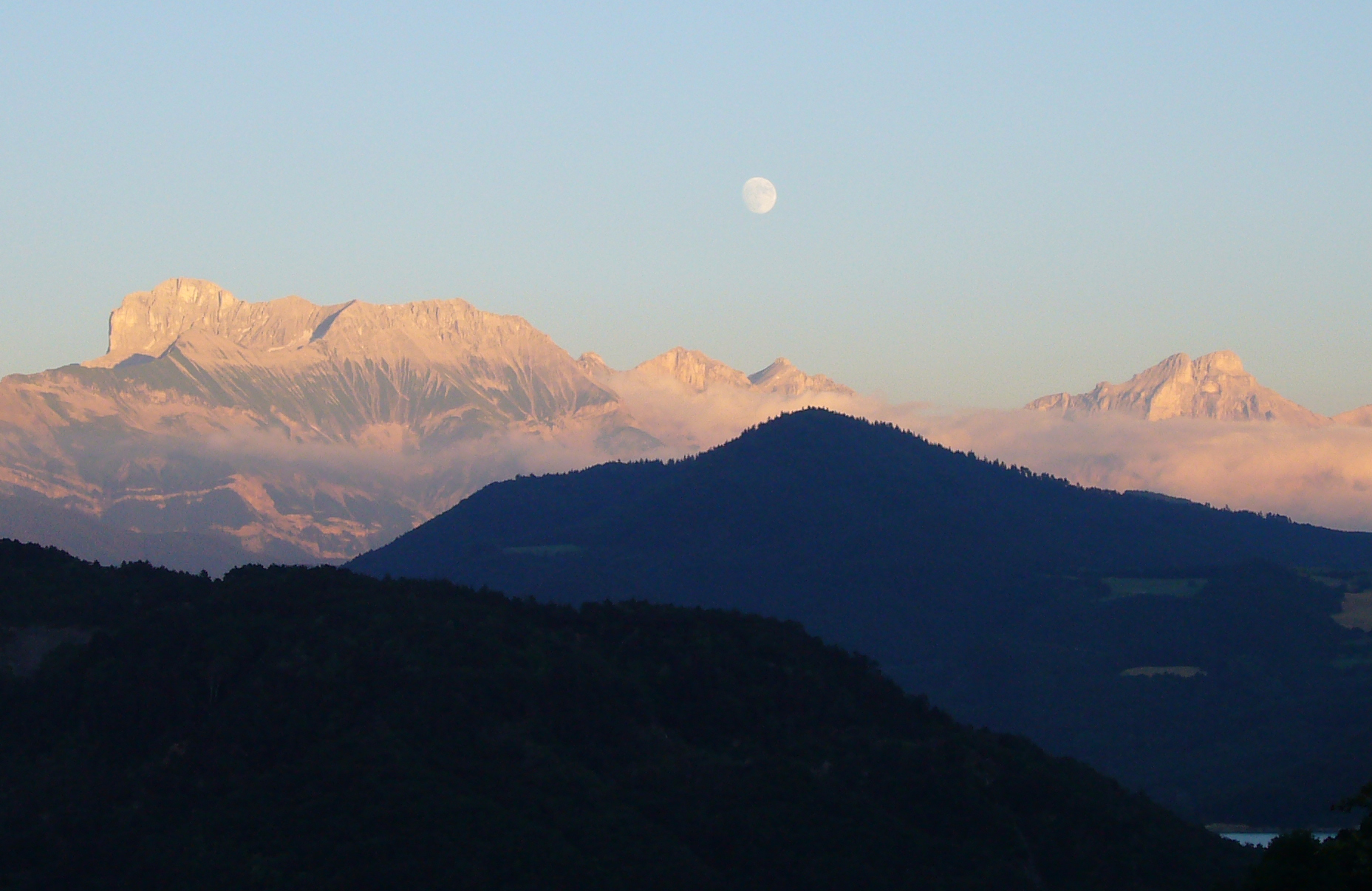
The view east from the lake

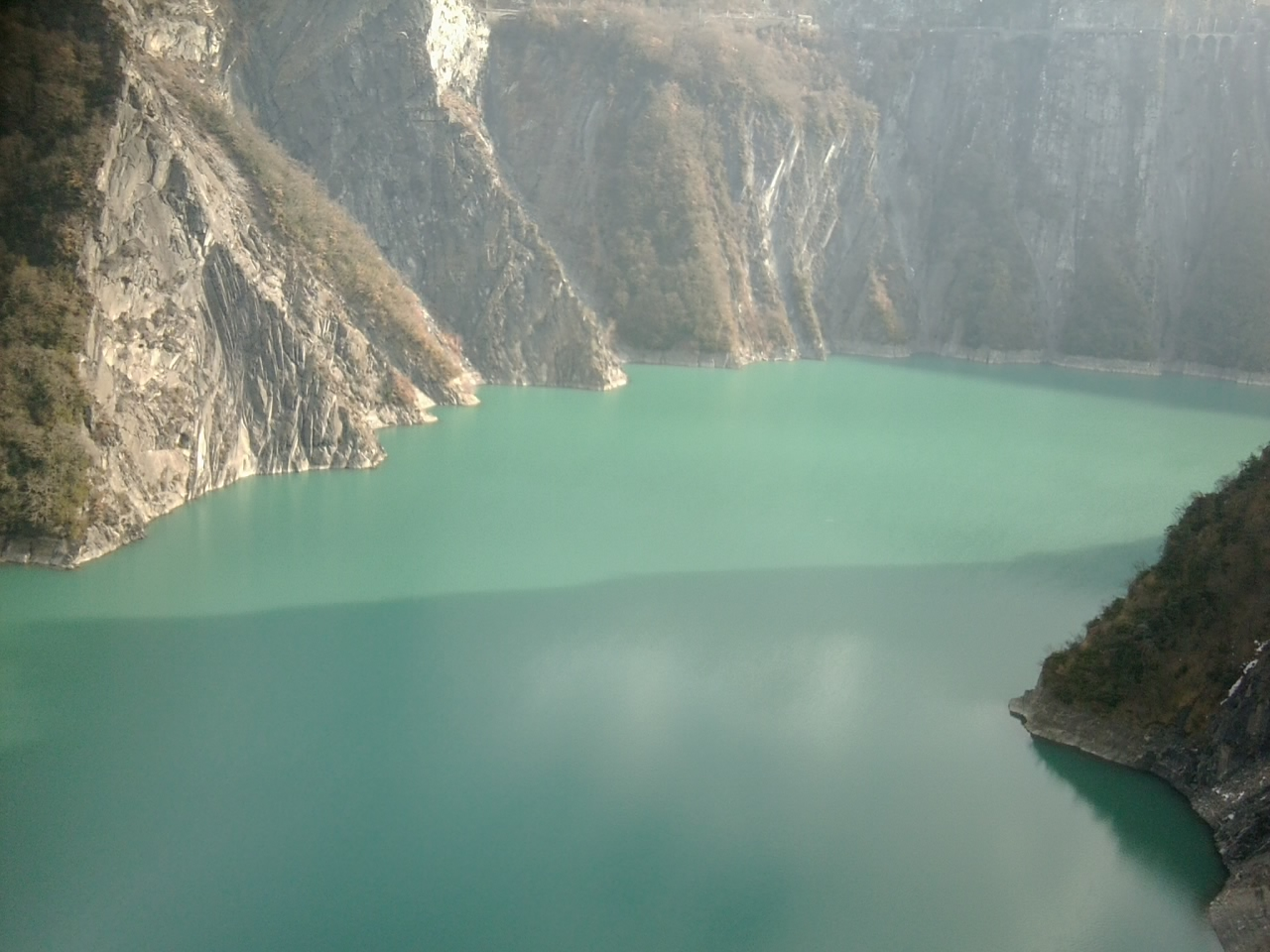

== See also ==
- Communes of the Isère department
