= Marcel Conche =

French philosopher (1922–2022)

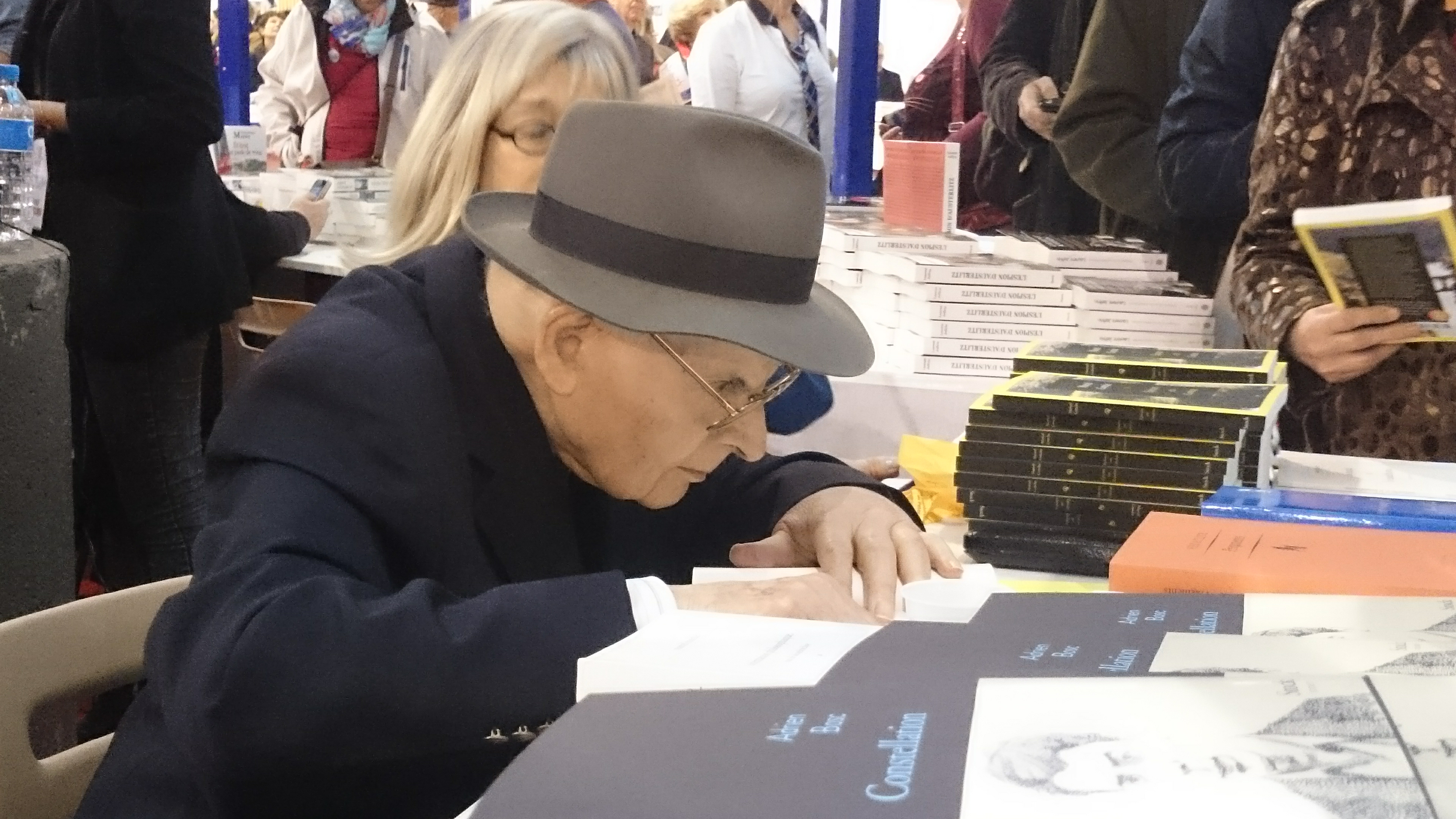
- Conche in 2014
- Born: 27 March 1922; Altillac, France
- Died: 27 February 2022 (aged 99); Treffort, France
- Occupation: Philosopher

Marcel Conche (French: [maʁsɛl kɔ̃ʃ]; 27 March 1922 – 27 February 2022) was a French philosopher and emeritus professor at the Paris-Sorbonne University.

== Biography ==
Marcel Conche was born in Altillac, France.

== Academic work ==
"Philosophizing ad infinitum" has been published by SUNY (State University of New York) Press, June 2014. It is the translation of one of his major works: "Philosopher à l'infini", published by PUF, in 2005.

An older publication (2003), the Tao Te Ching translation and comments in French, follows the format of previous works, such as Héraclite - Fragments (fragments of Heraclitus):

- French translation of the original text
- Commentary in the immediately ensuing chapter

In this book he draws an interesting parallel between the nearly contemporaries Lao Zi (see Tao Te Ching) and Heraclitus: the river of the Greek is compared to the Dao of the Chinese.

In some cases (such as the Heraclitus) the text (as handed down by tradition, copyists, historians or other authors quoting the now unavailable original text) is reordered to follow a more logical order, from the simplest of principles to the most advanced.

In 2016, Conche sat for an interview that has been documented in the revue Le Cahier des Rencontres Philosophiques de Monaco.

He was created a Commander of the Ordre des Arts et des Lettres and a Knight of the National Order of the Legion of Honour.

Conche died on 27 February 2022, at the age of 99, a month shy of turning 100.

== Bibliography ==
=== The History of Philosophy ===
- Montaigne ou la conscience heureuse (Montaigne or Happy Conscience), Éd. Seghers, 1964, 1966, 1970; rééd. Éd. de Mégare, 1992; PUF 2002, 2007, 2011.
- Montaigne et la philosophie (Montaigne and philosophy)), Éd. de Mégare, 1987, 1992; rééd. PUF, 1996, 1999, 2003, 2007, 2011.
- Préface à l'édition des Essais de Montaigne dans la collection "Quadrige", PUF, 2004, et Supplément, p. 1335-1365 (plan of the great 'Essais').
- Lucrèce et l’expérience, Éd. Seghers 1967; rééd. Éd. de Mégare, 1981, 1990, 1996; Éd. Fides, coll. "Noésis", 2003; PUF, 2011.
- Pyrrhon ou l’apparence (Pyrrho and appearance), Éd. de Mégare, 1973; 2e éd. remaniée et augmentée, PUF, 1994.
- Épicure: Lettres et Maximes, texte, traduction, introduction et notes, Éd. de Mégare, 1977; rééd. PUF, 1987,1990, 1992, 1995, 1999, 2003, 2009.
- Sur le "De Fato", inédit d'Octave Hamelin (On 'De fato', unedited by Octave Hamelin), publié et annoté par M. Conche, Éd. de Mégare, 1978.
- Héraclite: Fragments, texte établi, traduit et commenté, PUF, 1986, 1987, 1991, 1998, 2003, 2011.
- Anaximandre: Fragments et Témoignages, texte traduit et commenté, PUF, 1991, 2004, 2009.
- Parménide. Le Poème: Fragments, texte établi, traduit et commenté, PUF, 1996, 1999, 2004, 2009.

=== Criticism of Oriental Philosophy ===
- Nietzsche et le bouddhisme, Cahiers du Collège international de philosophie, n° 4, nov. 1987; rééd. Encre Marine, 1997, 2007, 2009. Traduit en italien.
- Lao‑Tseu, Tao‑Te‑king, traduction et commentaire, PUF, 2003, 2004, 2005, 2006, 2008, 2011. Commentaire traduit en chinois (commentary translated into Chinese).

=== Metaphysics ===
- Orientation philosophique (Philosophical orientation), Éd. de Mégare, 1974; 2e éd., remaniée et augmentée, avec préface d'André Comte‑Sponville, PUF, 1990, 1996; 3e éd. revue et augmentée, Les Belles Lettres, coll. "Encre Marine", 2011. Translated into Russian and Portuguese.
- La mort et la pensée (Death and thought), Éd. de Mégare, 1974, 1975; rééd. Éd. Cécile Defaut, 2007.
- Temps et destin (Time and destiny), Éd. de Mégare, 1980; 2e éd. augmentée, PUF, 1992, 1999.
- L’aléatoire, Éd. de Mégare, 1989, 1990; 2e ed., PUF, 1999; 3e éd., augmentée, Les Belles Lettres, coll. "Encre Marine", 2012.
- Le sens de la philosophie (The meaning of philosophy), Encre Marine, 1999; rééd. augmentée, 2003.
- Présence de la nature (Presence of nature), PUF, 2001; rééd. augmentée, PUF, coll. "Quadrige", 2011.
- Quelle philosophie pour demain? (Which philosophy for tomorrow?) PUF, 2003.
- Philosopher à l’infini, PUF, 2005, 2006. Translated into Polish and English (2014, State University of New York Press: Philosophizing ad infinitum).
- La liberté (Freedom), Les Belles Lettres, coll. "Encre Marine", 2011.
- Métaphysique, PUF, 2012.

=== Ethics and Moral Philosophy ===
- Le fondement de la morale (Foundation of morality), Éd. de Mégare, 1982, 1990; rééd. PUF,1993, 1999, 2003. Translated into Portuguese.
- Vivre et philosopher (Living and philosophizing), réponses aux questions de Lucile Laveggi, PUF, 1992, 1993, 1998; rééd. Livre de Poche, 2011.
- Analyse de l’amour et autres sujets (Analysing love and other subjects), PUF, 1997, 1998, 1999; rééd. Livre de Poche, 2011. Traduit en portugais.
- Entretien avec Sébastien Charles (Interview with Sébastien Charles), dans S. Charles, La philosophie française en question, Livre de poche, 1999.
- Confession d’un philosophe, réponses à André Comte‑Sponville, Albin Michel 2003; rééd. Livre de Poche, 2003. Traduit en espagnol.
- La voie certaine vers "Dieu," (The certain way to God), Les cahiers de l’Égaré, 2008.

=== Literary Works ===
- Ma vie antérieure (Ma anterior life), Encre Marine, 1997, et Le destin de solitude, Encre Marine, 1999; rééd. dans Ma vie antérieure & Le destin de solitude, Encre Marine, 2003.
- Essais sur Homère (Essais on Homer), PUF, 1999; rééd. coll. "Quadrige", 2003.
- De l’amour (On love). Pensées trouvées dans un vieux cahier de dessin, Les cahiers de l’Égaré, 2003; rééd. Cécile Defaut, 2008.
- Heidegger par gros temps, préface de Philippe Granarolo, Les Cahiers de l’Égaré, 2004. Traduit en espagnol.
- Avec des "si". Journal étrange I (With "yes-es". Strange Journal I), PUF, 2006, 2008, 2011.
- Oisivetés. Journal étrange II (Idleness. Strange Journal II), PUF, 2007.
- Noms. Journal étrange III (Names. Strange Journal III), PUF, 2008.
- Diversités. Journal étrange IV (Diversities. Strange Journal IV), Les Belles Lettres, coll. "Encre Marine", 2009.
- Corsica. Journal étrange V (Corsica. Strange Journal V), PUF, 2010, 2011.
- Le silence d’Émilie (The silence of Emilie), Les Cahiers de l’Égaré, 2010. Prix des Charmettes — Jean Jacques Rousseau.
- Entretien avec Gilbert Moreau (Interview with Gilbert Moreau) dans Les moments littéraires, n° 26, 2011. Portrait par Syliane Malinowski‑Charles.
- Ma vie (1922–1947), un amour sous l’Occupation (My life (1922-1947), a love under occupation), HDiffusion, 2012.
