= Lac de Monteynard-Avignonet =

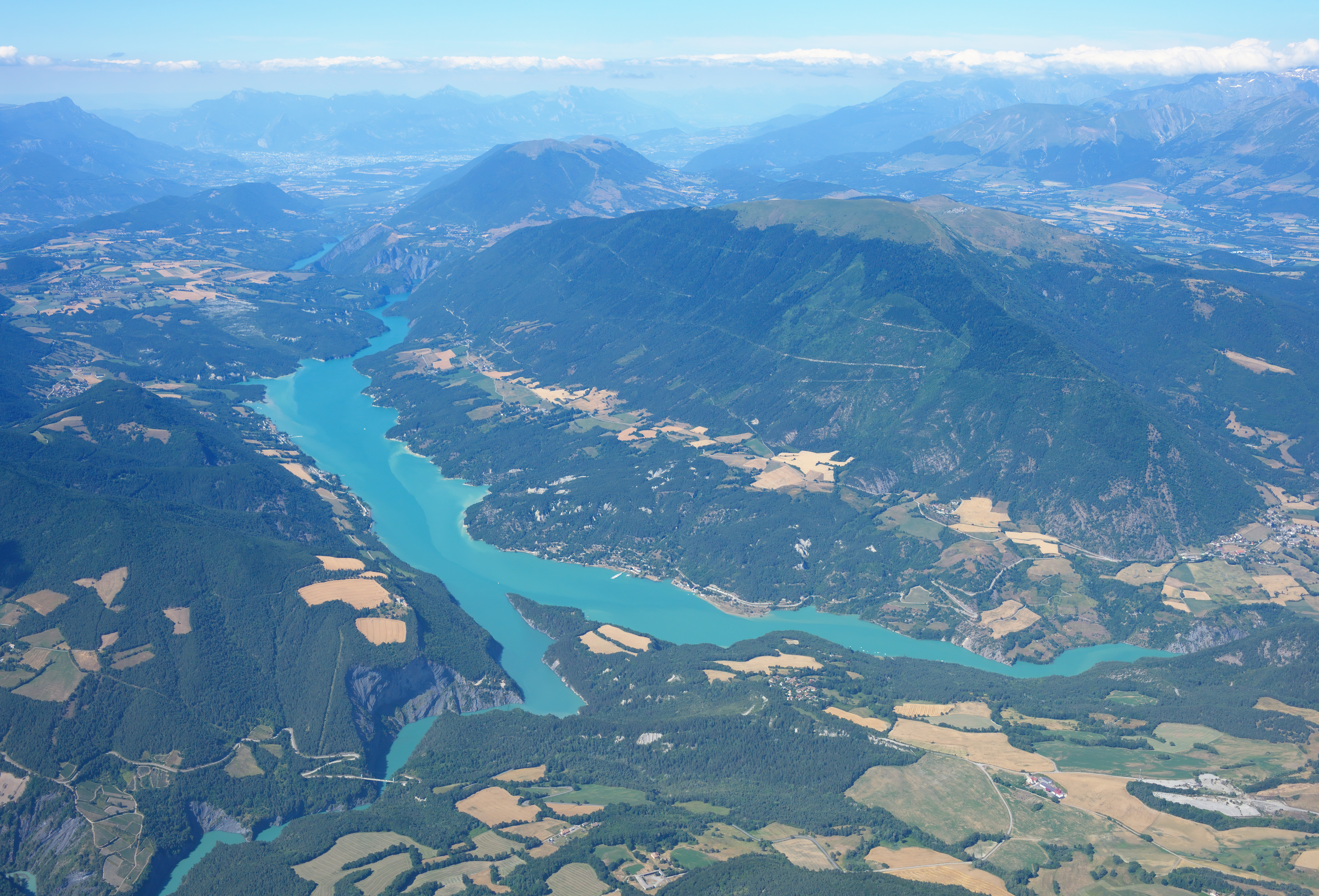
- Aerial view of the lake

- Location within Auvergne-Rhône-Alpes
- Location: Isère
- Coordinates: 44.9611°N 5.6884°E
- Type: Reservoir
- Primary inflows: Drac
- Primary outflows: Drac
- Basin countries: France
- Max. length: 10 km (6.2 mi)
- Max. width: 300 m (980 ft)
- Surface area: 6.60 km^{2} (2.55 sq mi)
- Max. depth: 115 m (377 ft)
- Surface elevation: 500 m (1,600 ft)

The Lac de Monteynard-Avignonet (Lake of Monteynard-Avignonet) is an artificial water reservoir for the Électricité de France (EDF) power station on the river Drac. It belongs to the department of Isère. It is bounded by the canyons of the Drac and Ebron.

The lake was created in 1962, when the 145-metre-high dam was built. The lake is 10 kilometres long; in some places it is up to 300 metres wide.

The lake is bordered by the following municipalities: Avignonet, Cognet, Marcieu, Mayres-Savel, Monteynard, La Motte-Saint-Martin, Roissard, Saint-Arey, Sinard, Treffort.

== The bridges ==
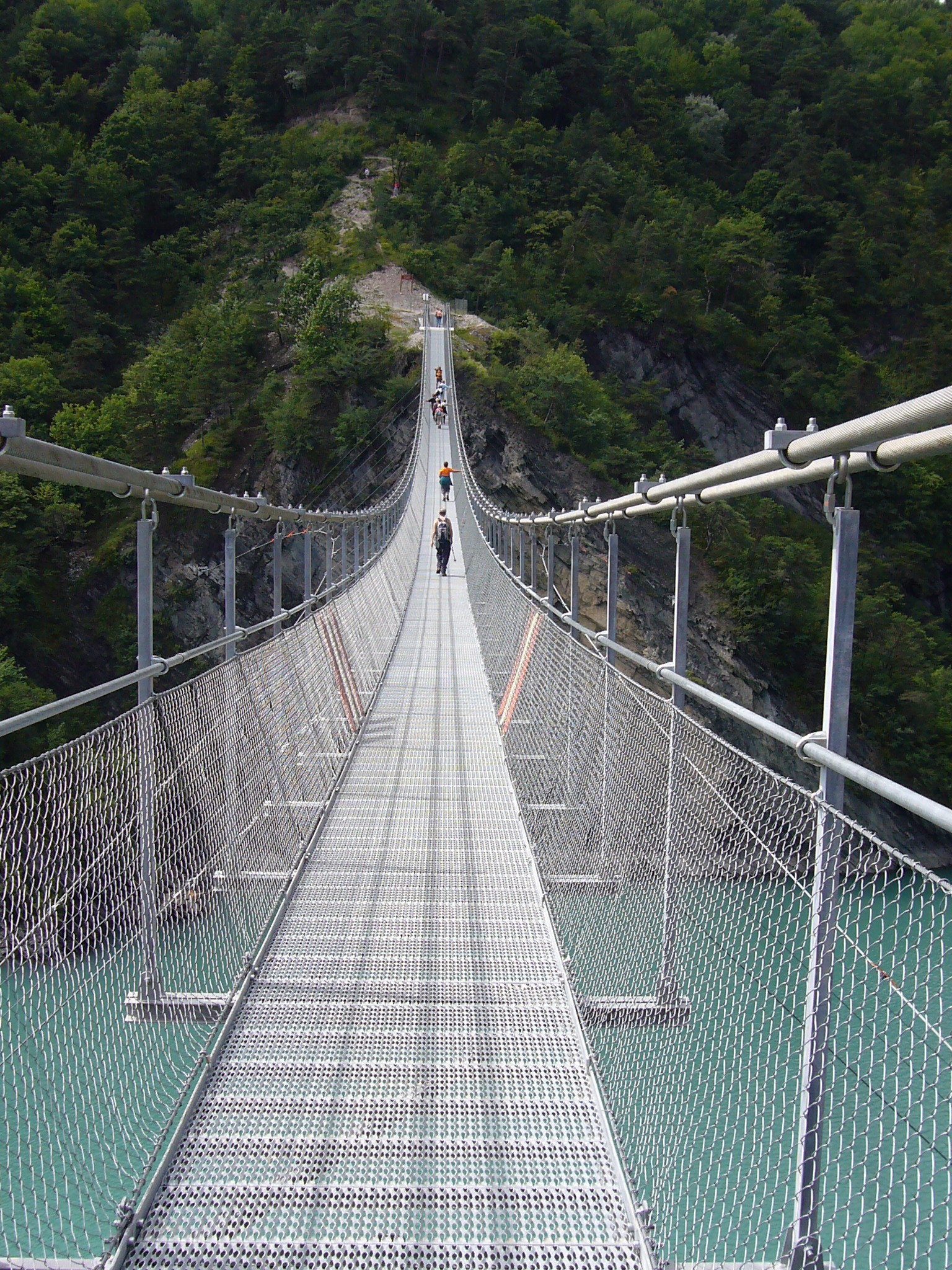
Pedestrian bridge (passerelle) over the Drac near Lac De Monteynard-Avignonet

In 2007 two simple suspension bridges were built across the Drac and Ebron. The bridges are 220 and 180 metres long, respectively, and used 1200 metres of cable. Depending on the level of the water in the lake, the Drac bridge is 45–85 metres high above the lake. Construction of the bridges was achieved with the help of helicopters.

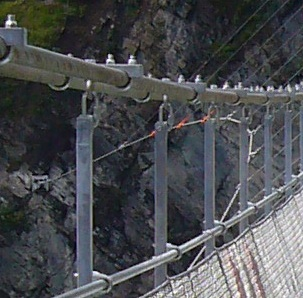
Cable stays below the deck to prevent the Drac bridge from swinging

The bridge design was based on traditional simple suspension bridges used in the Andes (see Inca rope bridge) and Himalayas to cross deep gorges from rim to rim. Locally, the Drac and Ebron bridges are known as passerelles himalayennes (French, "Himalayan footbridges"). Like some traditional bridges of this type, the Drac and Ebron bridges are stabilized with cables from below the deck.

The bridges allow hiking and biking from Matheysine to Trièves, as part of a 30 km route around the lake.

== See also ==
- List of notable pedestrian bridges
