= Types of suspension bridges =

A suspension bridge supports its structural load with cables, ropes, or chains anchored at each end. Cables on the earliest suspension bridges were anchored in the ground; some modern suspension bridges anchor the cables to the ends of the bridge itself. Earliest suspension bridges had no towers or piers but the majority of larger modern suspension bridges have them.

== Types ==
A pure suspension bridge is one without additional stay cables and in which the main cables are anchored in the ground. This includes most simple suspension bridges and suspended-deck suspension bridges, and excludes self-anchored suspension bridges.

Types of suspension bridge include:

Suspended-deck suspension bridge: the most familiar type. Though technically all the types listed here are suspension bridges, when unqualified with adjectives the term commonly refers to a suspended-deck suspension bridge. This type is suitable for use by heavy vehicles and light rail. The main cables are anchored to the earth. The deck is carried below the main cables by "suspenders" and usually is stiff.
Self-anchored suspension bridge: a modern descendant of the suspension bridge, combining elements of a cable-stayed bridge. The main cables are anchored to the ends of the decks.
Simple suspension bridge: the earliest known type of suspension bridge, and usually a footbridge. The deck is flexible and lies on the main cables, which are anchored to the earth.
Underspanned suspension bridge: an early 19th-century descendant of the simple suspension bridge. The deck is raised on posts above the main cables.
Taper suspension bridge: a 19th century variant of the suspension bridge where the suspenders pull at an angle to the ground, nearly tangent with the main cable
Stressed ribbon bridge: a modern descendant of the simple suspension bridge. The deck lies on the main cables, but is stiff, not flexible.

=== Spans ===
Most suspended-deck suspension bridges have three suspended spans: one central span between the towers, and two on the sides between each tower and an anchor. Some have a single-suspended-span design, where only the central span is suspended, while the side spans are supported from below and lack hanger cables. Examples of single-suspended-span bridges include the Williamsburg Bridge in New York City, and the Ambassador Bridge between Detroit, Michigan and Windsor, Ontario.

=== Hybrid types ===
Some suspension bridges are of unusual hybrid types. Among these are suspension bridges that have an "intermediate deck". These bridges have a portion of deck that resembles an underspanned suspension bridge. Some of the earliest suspended-deck suspension bridges were of this type, and they continue to be constructed. Examples constructed in the 20th century include a viaduct over the river Oberargen near Wangen, Germany. A 258-metre (846 ft) span of the viaduct has a cable support below the deck, with one end of the cable anchored at a pier and the other end tied into a conventional cable stay. The underspanned portion of the span is 172-metre (564 ft) long and has three vertical members.

The Akashi Kaikyō Bridge, one of the longest suspension bridges in the world, is a suspended-deck suspension bridge with a stiff truss girder deck. Its main span is 1,991 m (6,532 ft) long.

== Construction ==
Unlike other types of bridge, suspension bridges can usually be built without use of falsework or even any access from below the bridge. In many cases, the main cables are constructed first, often with a pilot cable. Construction then proceeds by hanging components and equipment from the main cables. The articles about each type of bridge have further specific construction details.

Suspension bridges are suitable for the longest spans, provided the cables and their anchorage are of sufficient strength. Their construction cost is high, so usually they are less economical than other bridges for spans less than 1,000 ft (300 m). However, shorter spans have been constructed for aesthetic reasons.

All types of suspension bridges have less rigidity than other bridges. Because of their greater flexibility, these bridges are more suitable as road bridges than railroad bridges.

== See also ==
- Simple suspension bridge § Living bridges (bridges made of living plants)
- Cable-stayed bridge
- Floating suspension bridge
- List of longest suspension bridges
