= Monteynard =

- Commune
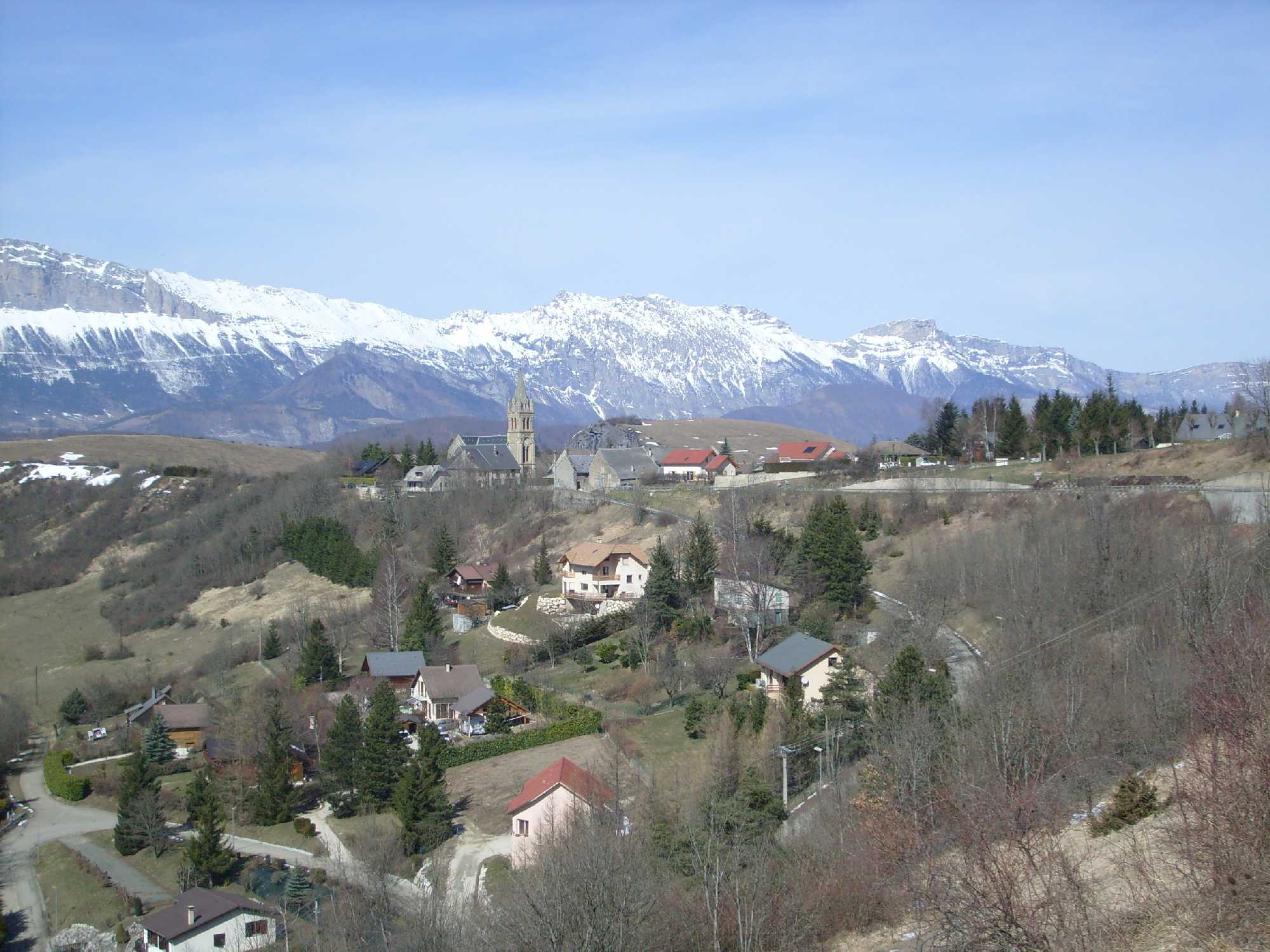
- A general view of Monteynard
- Location of Monteynard
- Location within France Location within Auvergne-Rhône-Alpes
- Coordinates: 44°58′37″N 5°42′21″E
- Country: France
- Region: Auvergne-Rhône-Alpes
- Department: Isère
- Arrondissement: Grenoble
- Canton: Matheysine-Trièves

Government
  - Mayor (2020–2026): Richard Passelande
- Area^{1}: 11 km^{2} (4.2 sq mi)
- Elevation: 780 m (2,560 ft)
- Highest elevation: 1,712 m (5,617 ft)
- Lowest elevation: 362 m (1,188 ft)
- Population (2023): 502
  - Density: 46/km^{2} (120/sq mi)
- Time zone: UTC+01:00 (CET)
  - Summer (DST): UTC+02:00 (CEST)
- INSEE/Postal code: 38254 /38770
- ^{1} French Land Register data, which excludes lakes, ponds, glaciers > 1 km^{2} (0.386 sq mi or 247 acres) and river estuaries.

Monteynard (French pronunciation: [mɔ̃tɛnaʁ]) is a commune in the Isère department in southeastern France. It is the namesake of the Lac de Monteynard-Avignonet.

== Population ==
Historical population
Year	Pop.	±% p.a.
1968	174	—
1975	154	−1.73%
1982	244	+6.80%
1990	330	+3.85%
1999	402	+2.22%
2007	459	+1.67%
2012	496	+1.56%
2017	487	−0.37%
2023	502	+0.51%
Source: INSEE

== See also ==
- Communes of the Isère department
