= Sky Bridge 721 =

Suspension bridge in the Czech Republic

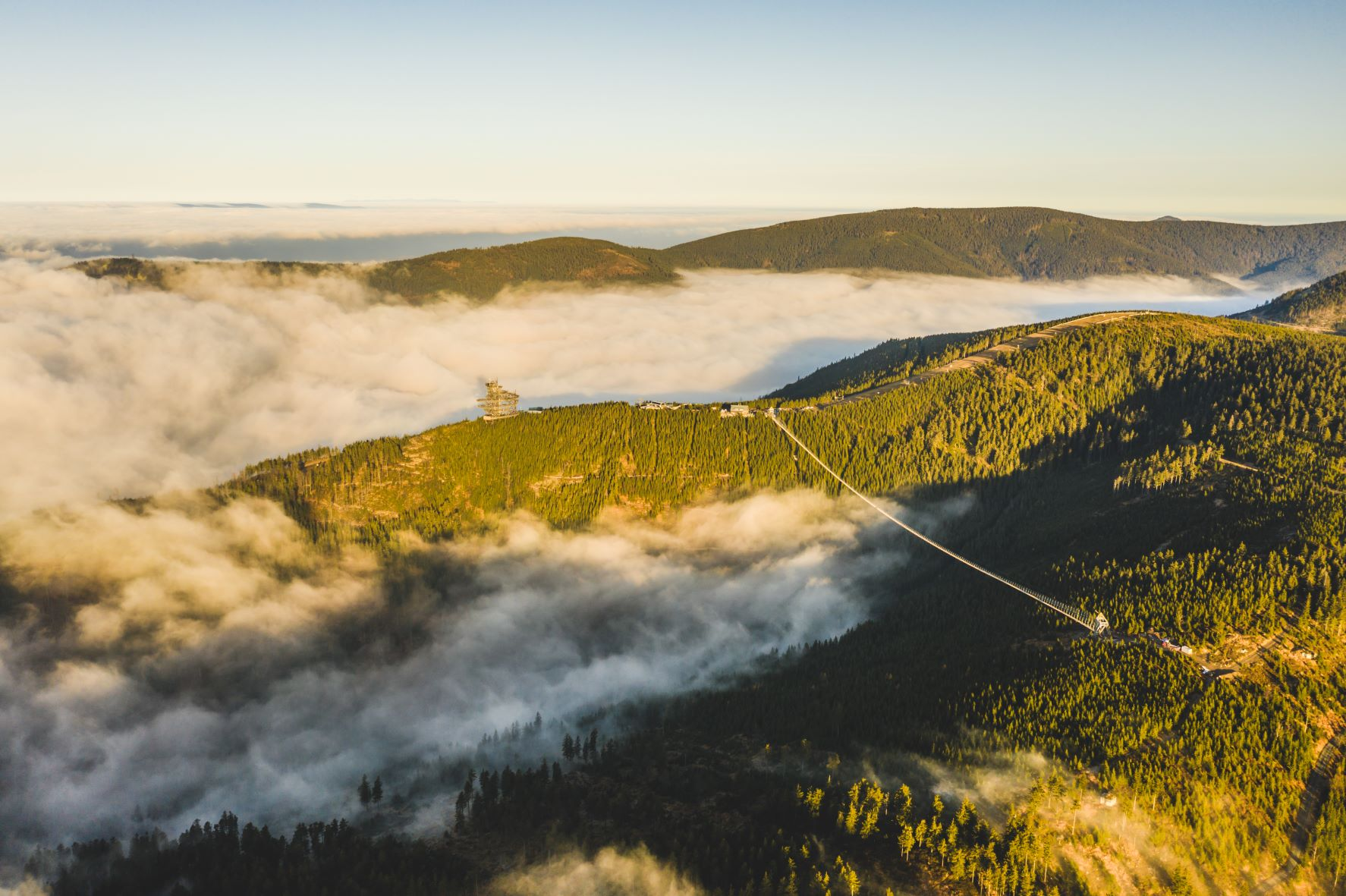
- Coordinates: 50°08′56″N 16°50′13″E
- Carries: Walkway

Characteristics
- Design: Suspension bridge
- Material: Steel
- Total length: 721 m (2,365 ft)
- Height: 95 m (312 ft)
- No. of lanes: 1

History
- Construction start: 2021
- Opened: 13 May 2022

Location
- Interactive map of Sky Bridge 721

Sky Bridge 721 is a suspension footbridge in the municipality of Dolní Morava, Czech Republic. The bridge is 721 metres long and is at a height of up to 95 metres off the ground. It was opened on 13 May 2022. It was the longest of its kind in the world till the Bridge of National Unity in Hungary was opened.

Located in the Králický Sněžník mountain, it offers users panoramic views of the landscape. The suspension bridge spans the valley of the Mlýnský Stream, from the ridge of Slamník Mountain to the ridge of Chlum Mountain; it is 1,125 metres above sea level on one side and 1,135 metres above sea level on the other.

An "educational nature trail" called "The Bridge of Time" was prepared with elements of augmented reality in cooperation with the state-owned enterprise Lesy ČR (Forests of the Czech Republic) and the Museum of Czechoslovak Fortifications of 1935–1938. A game with ten educational panels covers the topics of environmental protection and how to behave in the countryside, as well as the history and life story of a family from Dolní Morava against the backdrop of events that affected Czechoslovakia / the Czech Republic from 1935 until now.

== See also ==
- Arouca 516
- Gandaki Golden Footbridge, former longest footbridge
