= Treffort =

Treffort Trafòrt (Occitan)
- Commune
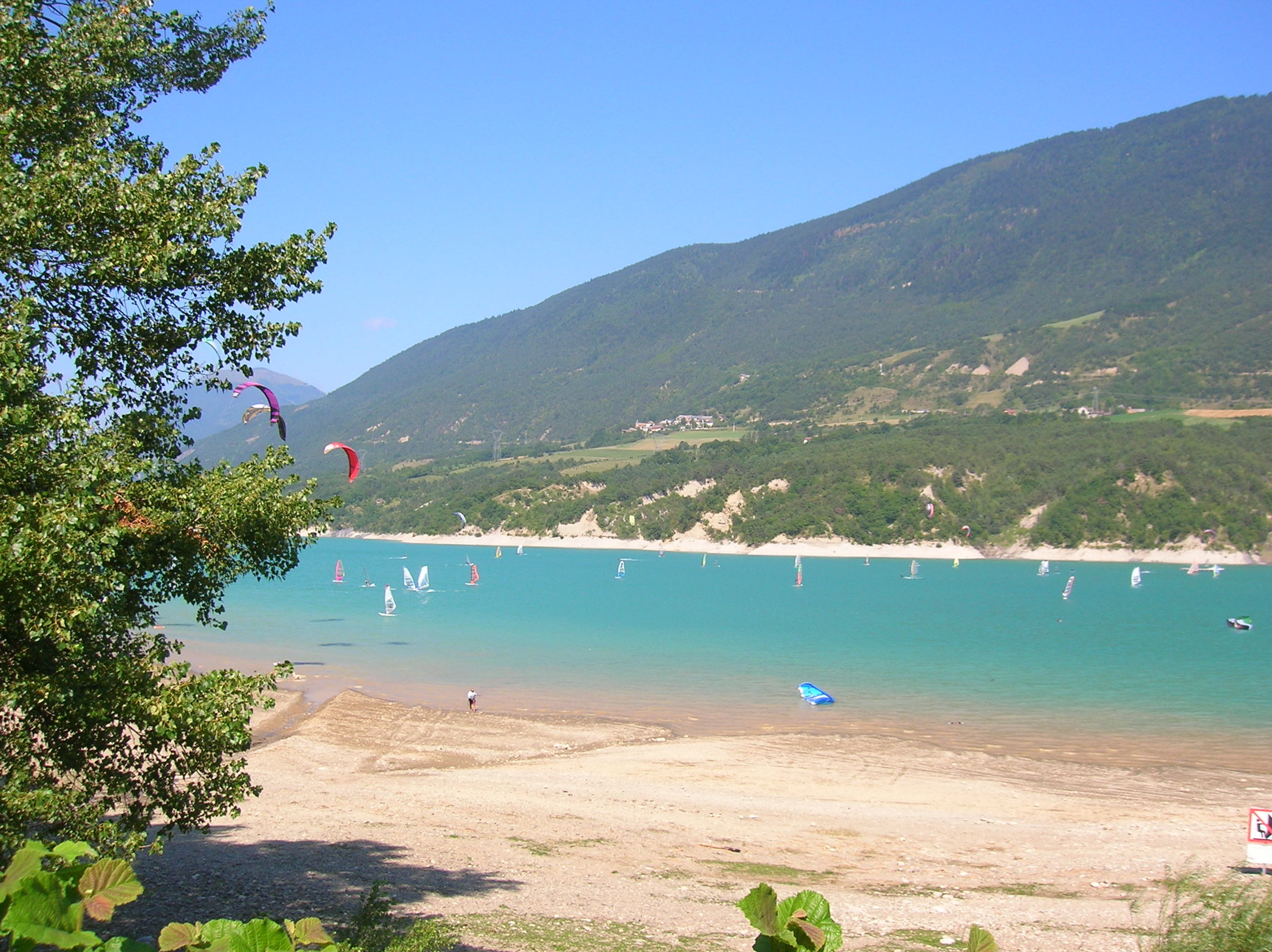
- Monteynard Lake
- Location of Treffort
- Location within France Location within Auvergne-Rhône-Alpes
- Coordinates: 44°54′59″N 5°39′32″E
- Country: France
- Region: Auvergne-Rhône-Alpes
- Department: Isère
- Arrondissement: Grenoble
- Canton: Matheysine-Trièves

Government
  - Mayor (2020–2026): Pierrick Bonenfant
- Area^{1}: 11 km^{2} (4.2 sq mi)
- Elevation: 618 m (2,028 ft)
- Highest elevation: 1,070 m (3,510 ft)
- Lowest elevation: 486 m (1,594 ft)
- Population (2023): 249
  - Density: 23/km^{2} (59/sq mi)
- Time zone: UTC+01:00 (CET)
  - Summer (DST): UTC+02:00 (CEST)
- INSEE/Postal code: 38513 /38650
- ^{1} French Land Register data, which excludes lakes, ponds, glaciers > 1 km^{2} (0.386 sq mi or 247 acres) and river estuaries.

Treffort (French pronunciation: [tʁefɔʁ]; Occitan: Trafòrt) is a commune in the Isère department in the Auvergne-Rhône-Alpes region in Southeastern France.

== Demographics ==
Historical population
Year	Pop.	±% p.a.
1968	57	—
1975	53	−1.03%
1982	69	+3.84%
1990	78	+1.54%
1999	129	+5.75%
2007	223	+7.08%
2012	256	+2.80%
2017	292	+2.67%
2023	249	−2.62%
Source: INSEE

== See also ==
- Communes of the Isère department
- Lac de Monteynard-Avignonet
