= Bridge of National Unity (Hungary) =

Suspension bridge in Hungary

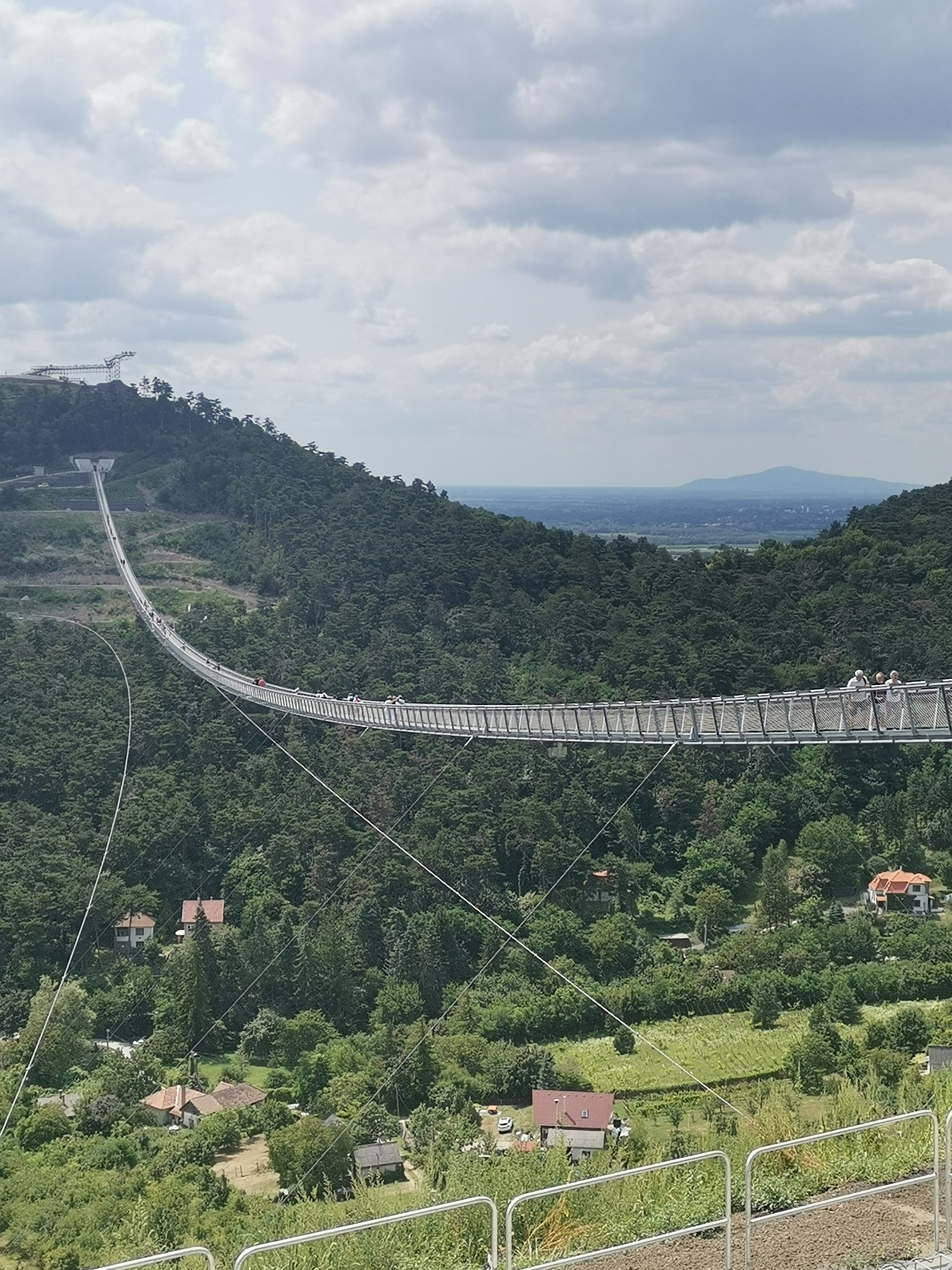
- Coordinates: 48°23′24″N 21°38′23″E
- Carries: Walkway

Characteristics
- Design: Suspension bridge
- Material: Steel
- Total length: 723 m (2,372 ft)
- Height: 84 m (276 ft)
- No. of lanes: 1

History
- Construction start: 2024
- Opened: 4 June 2024

Location
- Interactive map of Bridge of National Unity

The Bridge of National Unity (Hungarian: Nemzeti Összetartozás Hídja) is a pedestrian suspension bridge located in Sátoraljaújhely, in northeastern Hungary, near the border with Slovakia. Officially inaugurated on June 4, 2024, the bridge spans the Májuskút Valley and connects two hills in the Zemplén Mountains. It is noted for its record-breaking main span and symbolic national significance. In 2025, the bridge received official recognition from Guinness World Records as the world's longest span traditional pedestrian suspension bridge.

== Design ==
The Bridge of National Unity is a cable-stayed suspension bridge measuring 723 metres (2,372 ft) in length and suspended 84 metres (276 ft) above the valley floor. It is supported by six cable ropes and has a glass-floored section at its center, offering panoramic views of the surrounding landscape.

It is longer than the Czech Republic's Sky Bridge 721 (721 metres), Hungarian authorities emphasize that their bridge holds the world record for the longest span between two support pillars in a pedestrian suspension bridge.

== Recognition ==
In January 2025, the bridge received official recognition from Guinness World Records as the world's longest span traditional pedestrian suspension bridge. The structure was recognized for its "important and special architectural solution." It surpassed the previous record by two meters.

== Financing ==
The project was completed at a cost of approximately four billion Hungarian forints (around 10 million euros), financed by Hungary's national budget. The Hungarian government stated that no European Union funds were used.

== Access ==
The bridge is a key attraction in the Zemplén region and can accommodate up to 300 visitors at a time. By the end of 2024, it had attracted more than 300,000 visitors, according to Sátoraljaújhely mayor Péter Szamosvölgyi.

Visitors are charged an entrance fee of 5,000 HUF (approximately 12 euros) per person.

== Significance ==
The bridge was inaugurated on Hungary's June 4 Day of National Unity, to commemorate the anniversary of the Treaty of Trianon. Signed in 1920 after World War I, the treaty resulted in Hungary losing two-thirds of its territory and about half of its population to neighboring countries.

== See also ==
- Zemplén Adventure Park
- Sky Bridge 721
- List of longest bridges
- Treaty of Trianon
