= Drac (river) =

River in southeastern France

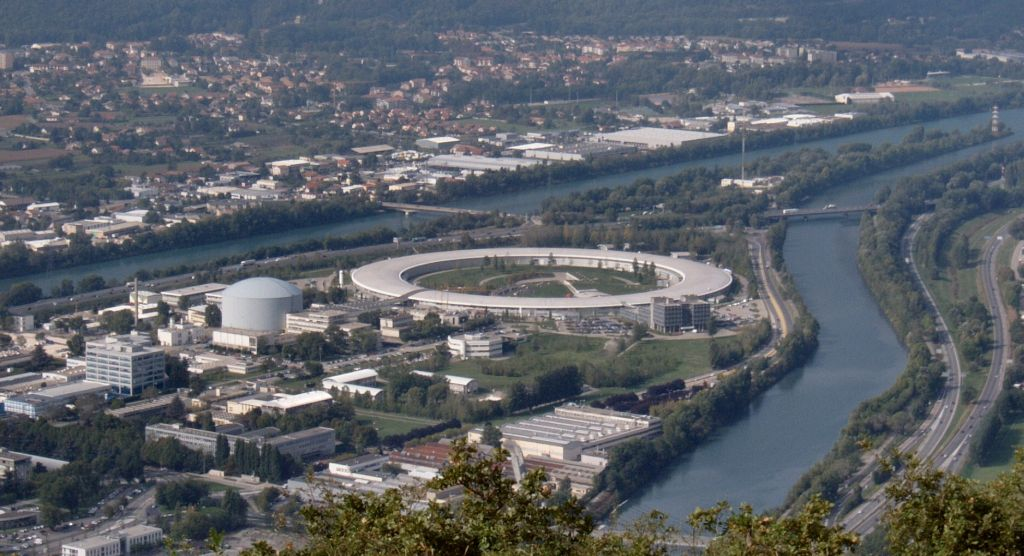
- Confluence of the Drac with the Isère in Grenoble

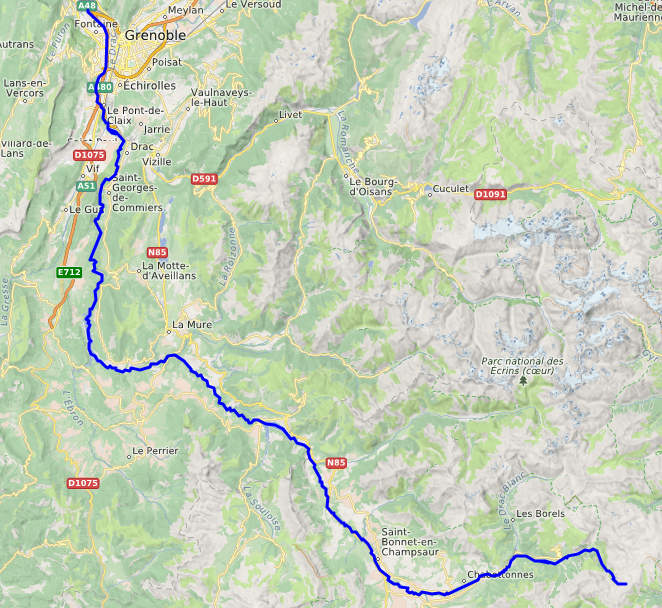

Location
- Country: France

Physical characteristics
- Source
  - location: Massif des Écrins
- Mouth
  - location: Isère
  - coordinates: 45°12′55″N 5°40′31″E
- Length: 130 km (81 mi)
- Basin size: 3,599 km^{2} (1,390 sq mi)
- Discharge
  - average: 97 m^{3}/s (3,400 cu ft/s)

Basin features
- Progression: Isère→ Rhône→ Mediterranean Sea

The Drac (French pronunciation: [dʁak]) is a 130-kilometre (81 mi) long river in southeastern France. It is a left tributary of the river Isère. It is formed at the confluence of the Drac Noir and the Drac Blanc, which both rise in the southern part of the Massif des Écrins, high in the French Alps. It flows through several reservoirs on its course, including the Lac de Monteynard-Avignonet. It flows into the Isère at Grenoble. Its major tributary is the Romanche.

The Drac flows through the following departments and towns:

- Hautes-Alpes: Saint-Bonnet-en-Champsaur
- Isère: Corps, Grenoble

The average flow of the Drac at Fontaine is 97 cubic metres per second (3,400 cu ft/s), with the highest monthly flows occurring in June, due to the melting of Alpine glaciers. The catchment area of the river is 3,599 square kilometres (1,390 mi^{2}), which has an average rainfall of 859 millimetres (33.8 in).

The name Drac, originally the Drau, is due to an attraction by the Occitan drac "imp", which is derived from the Latin dracō, meaning "Dragon". It is documented in the forms of Dracum (v. 1100), Dravus (1289) and the ribière dou Drau (1545). The word "Drac" means Dragon. In many legends the drac, in Occitan, is a genius of evil waters or a form of Satan that attracts children to drown. Frédéric Mistral wrote in Félibrige Treasury:

Drac of the Rhone was a winged monster and amphibian which carried on the body of a reptile the shoulders and the head of a beautiful young man. He lived the bottom of the river where he tried to attract, to devour it, the imprudent ones gained by the softness of its voice.

In December 1995, six children and their teacher were drowned in the river after the level of water rose due to the opening of the valves of a dam. They were there to see beavers. All of them died.
