= Sinard =

- Commune
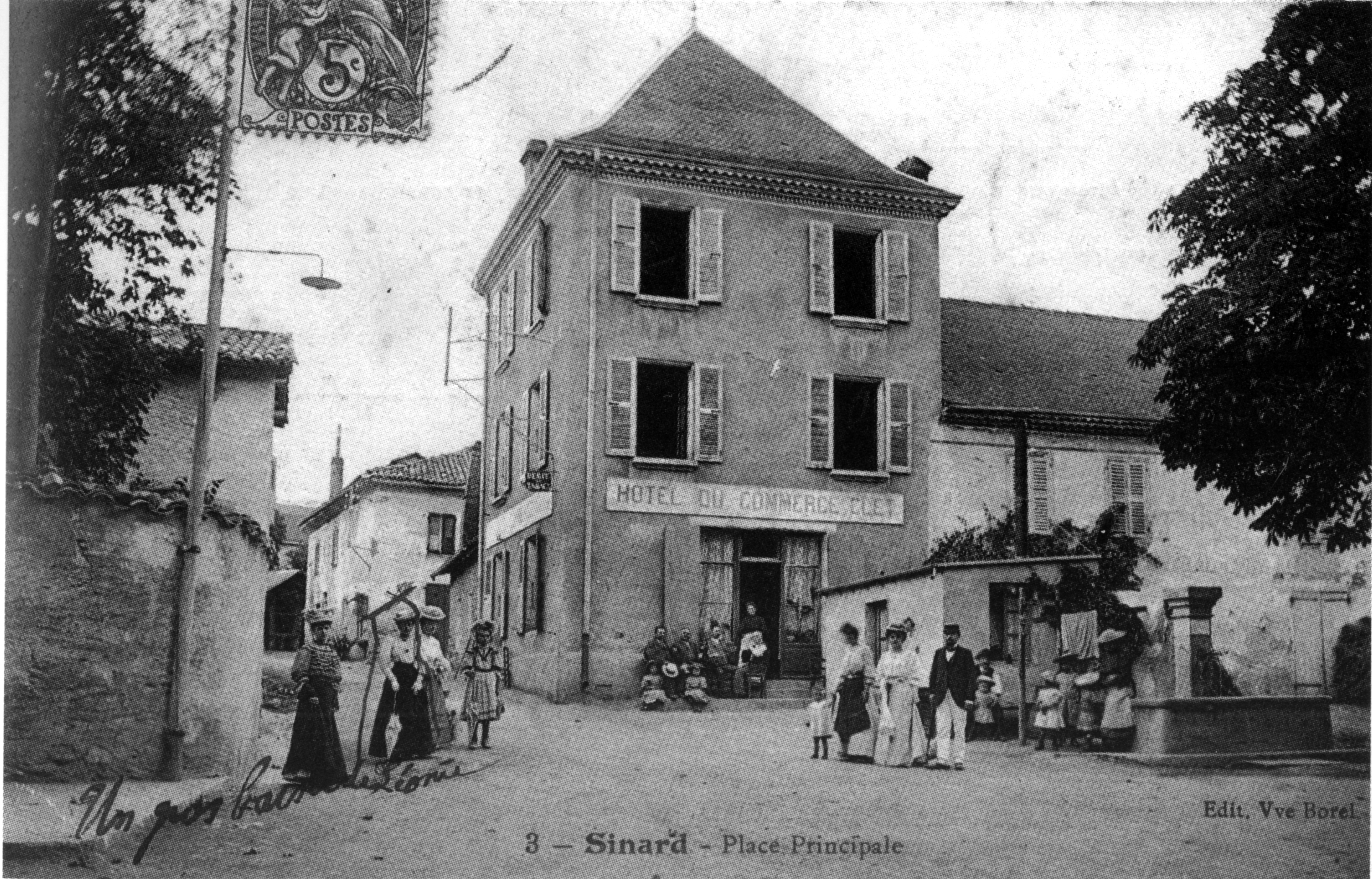
- Sinard in 1906
- Location of Sinard
- Location within France Location within Auvergne-Rhône-Alpes
- Coordinates: 44°56′47″N 5°39′26″E
- Country: France
- Region: Auvergne-Rhône-Alpes
- Department: Isère
- Arrondissement: Grenoble
- Canton: Matheysine-Trièves

Government
  - Mayor (2020–2026): Christian Roux
- Area^{1}: 10 km^{2} (3.9 sq mi)
- Highest elevation: 1,005 m (3,297 ft)
- Lowest elevation: 485 m (1,591 ft)
- Population (2023): 724
  - Density: 72/km^{2} (190/sq mi)
- Time zone: UTC+01:00 (CET)
  - Summer (DST): UTC+02:00 (CEST)
- INSEE/Postal code: 38492 /38650
- ^{1} French Land Register data, which excludes lakes, ponds, glaciers > 1 km^{2} (0.386 sq mi or 247 acres) and river estuaries.

Sinard (French pronunciation: [sinaʁ]) is a commune in the Isère department in southeastern France.

== Population ==
Historical population
Year	Pop.	±% p.a.
1968	294	—
1975	256	−1.96%
1982	281	+1.34%
1990	494	+7.31%
1999	579	+1.78%
2007	641	+1.28%
2012	647	+0.19%
2017	692	+1.35%
2023	724	+0.76%
Source: INSEE

== See also ==
- Communes of the Isère department
