= Suspension bridge =

Type of bridge

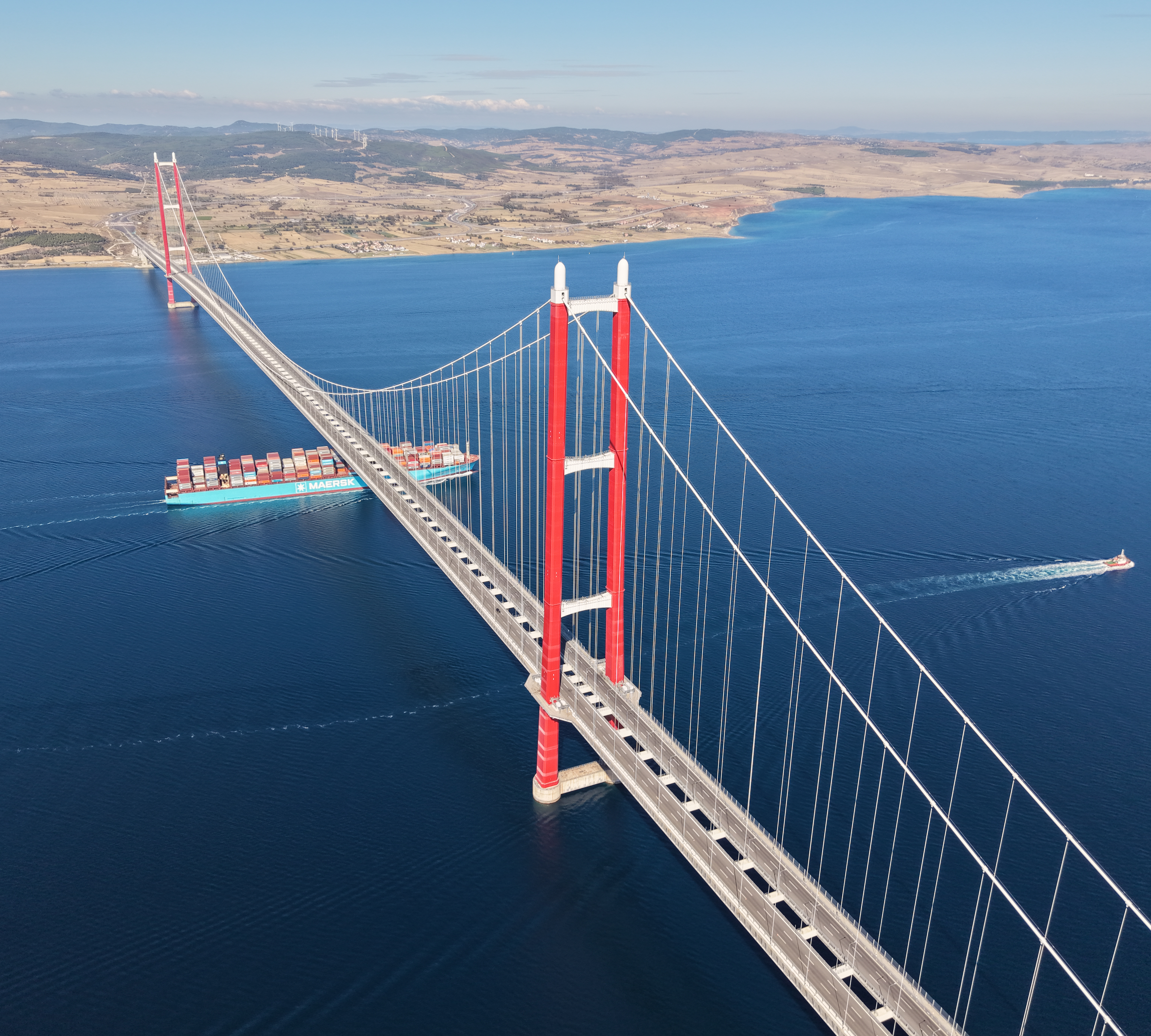
- The 1915 Çanakkale Bridge on the Dardanelles strait in Turkey, connecting Europe and Asia, is the suspension bridge with the longest main span in the world.
- Span range: Medium to long
- Material: Steel rope, multiple steel wire strand cables or forged or cast chain links
- Movable: No
- Design effort: medium
- Falsework required: No

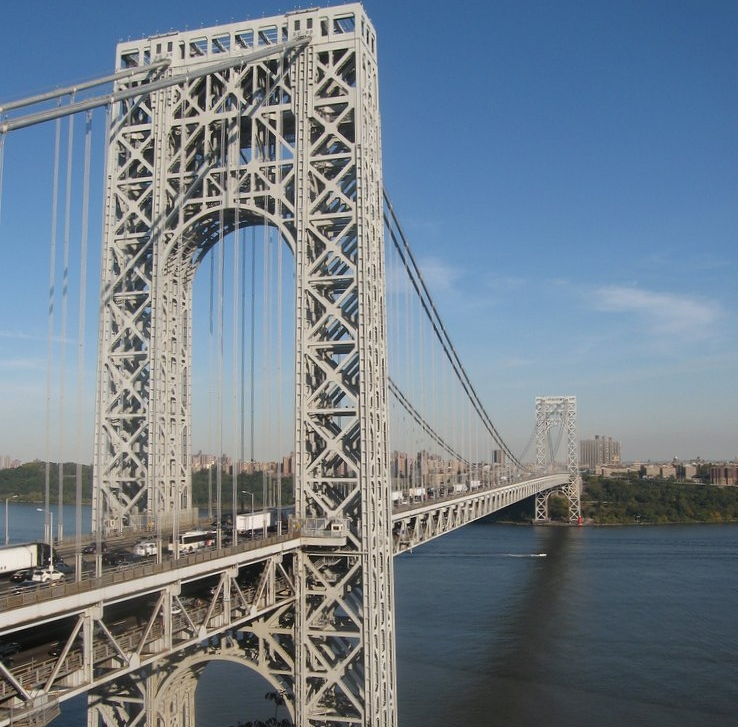
The double-decked George Washington Bridge, connecting New York City to Bergen County, New Jersey, is the world's busiest suspension bridge by traversing vehicles, carrying 106 million vehicles annually.

A suspension bridge is a type of bridge in which the deck is hung below suspension cables on vertical suspenders. The first modern examples of this type of bridge were built in the early 19th century. Simple suspension bridges, which lack vertical suspenders, have a long history in many mountainous regions worldwide.

Besides the bridge type most commonly called suspension bridges, covered in this article, there are other types of suspension bridges. The type covered here has cables suspended between towers, with vertical suspender cables that transfer the live and dead loads of the deck below, upon which traffic crosses. This arrangement allows the deck to be level or to arc upward for additional clearance. Like other suspension bridge types, this type often is constructed without the use of falsework.

The suspension cables must be anchored at each end of the bridge, since any load applied to the bridge is transformed into tension in these main cables. The main cables continue beyond the pillars to deck-level supports, and further continue to connections with anchors in the ground. The roadway is supported by vertical suspender cables or rods, called hangers. In some circumstances, the towers may sit on a bluff or canyon edge where the road may proceed directly to the main span. Otherwise, the bridge will typically have two smaller spans, running between either pair of pillars and the highway, which may be supported by suspender cables or their own trusswork. In cases where trusswork supports the spans, there will be very little arc in the outboard main cables.

== History ==
The earliest suspension bridges were ropes slung across a chasm, with a deck possibly at the same level or hung below the ropes such that the rope had a catenary shape.

=== Precursors ===
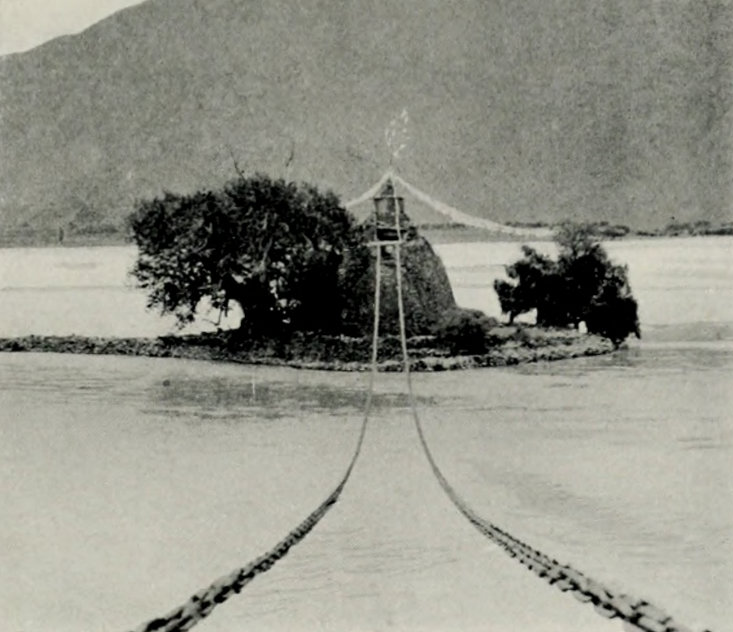
Chushul Chakzam, one of Thangtong Gyalpo's chain bridges, in 1904

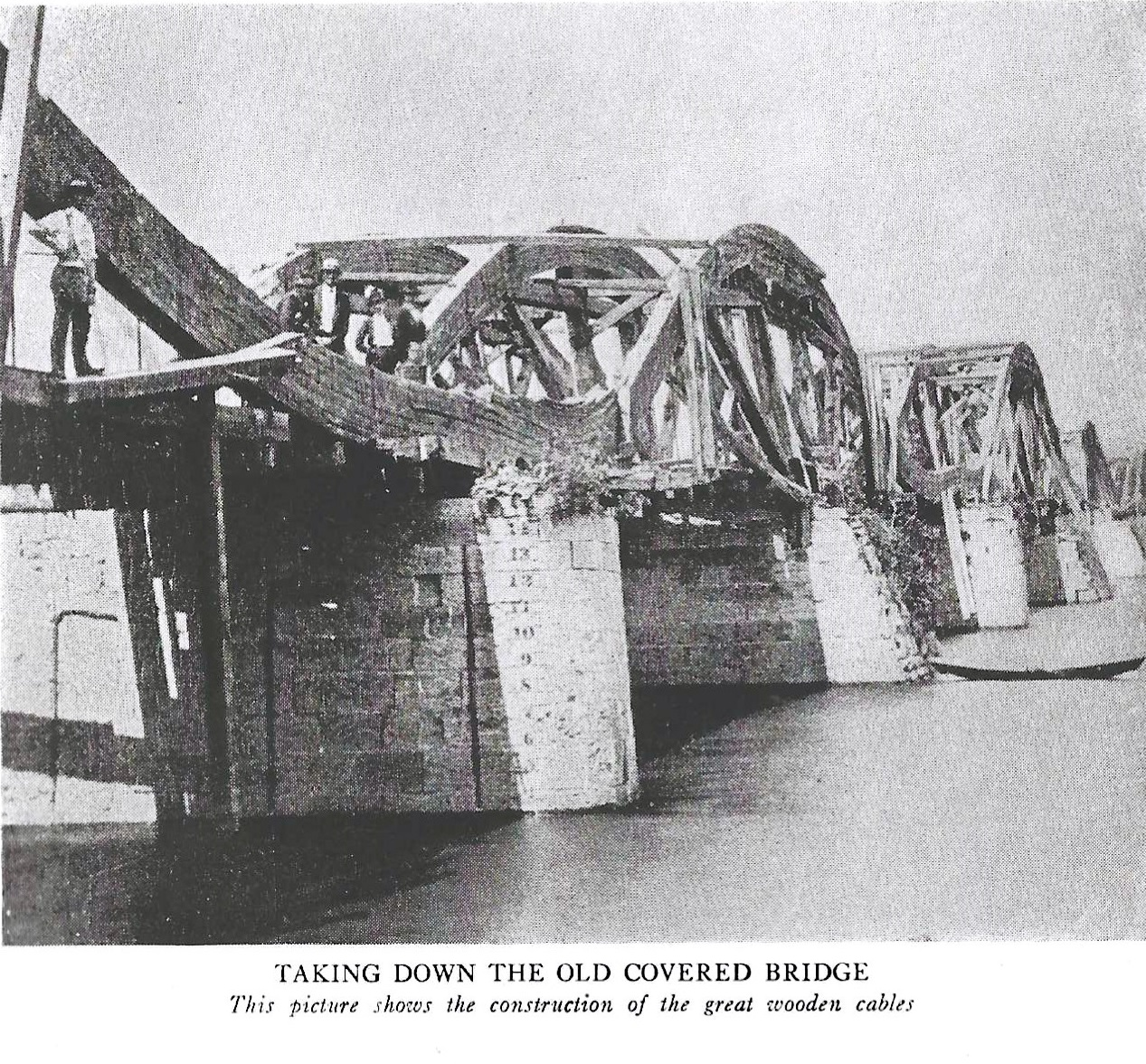
The wooden 1808 Burr Suspension Bridge in Schenectady, NY, US, during demolition in 1871, showing wooden cables. Spans of 160, 190, 180 and 157 feet on 3 piers began to sag, and 4 supporting piers were added in 1833, making 8 spans.

The Tibetan siddha and bridge-builder Thangtong Gyalpo originated the use of iron chains in his version of simple suspension bridges. In 1433, Gyalpo built eight bridges in eastern Bhutan. The last surviving chain-linked bridge of Gyalpo's was the Thangtong Gyalpo Bridge in Duksum en route to Trashi Yangtse, which was finally washed away in 2004. Gyalpo's iron chain bridges did not include a suspended-deck bridge, which is the standard on all modern suspension bridges today. Instead, both the railing and the walking layer of Gyalpo's bridges used wires. The stress points that carried the screed were reinforced by the iron chains. Before the use of iron chains it is thought that Gyalpo used ropes from twisted willows or yak skins. He may have also used tightly bound cloth.

The Inca used rope bridges, documented as early as 1615. It is not known when they were first made. Queshuachaca is considered the last remaining Inca rope bridge and is rebuilt annually.

=== Chain bridges ===
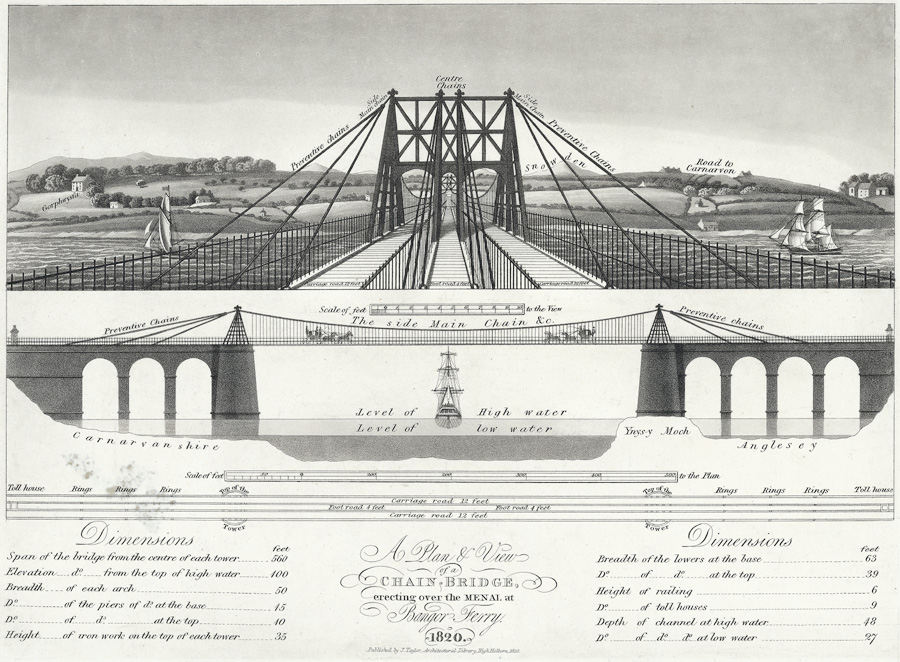
An early plan for the chain bridge over the Menai Strait near Bangor, Wales, completed in 1826

The first iron chain suspension bridge in the Western world was the Jacob's Creek Bridge (1801) in Westmoreland County, Pennsylvania, designed by inventor James Finley. Finley's bridge was the first to incorporate all of the necessary components of a modern suspension bridge, including a suspended deck which hung by trusses. Finley patented his design in 1808, and published it in the Philadelphia journal, The Port Folio, in 1810.

Early British chain bridges included the Dryburgh Abbey Bridge (1817) and 137 m Union Bridge (1820), with spans rapidly increasing to 176 m with the Menai Bridge (1826), "the first important modern suspension bridge". The first chain bridge on the German speaking territories was the Chain Bridge in Nuremberg. The Sagar Iron Suspension Bridge with a 200 feet span (also termed Beose Bridge) was constructed near Sagar, India during 1828–1830 by Duncan Presgrave, Mint and Assay Master. The Clifton Suspension Bridge (designed in 1831, completed in 1864 with a 214 m central span), is similar to the Sagar bridge. It is one of the longest of the parabolic arc chain type. The current Marlow suspension bridge was designed by William Tierney Clark and was built between 1829 and 1832, replacing a wooden bridge further downstream which collapsed in 1828. It is the only suspension bridge across the non-tidal Thames. The Széchenyi Chain Bridge, (designed in 1840, opened in 1849), spanning the River Danube in Budapest, was also designed by William Clark and it is a larger-scale version of Marlow Bridge. One variation is the Thornewill and Warham's Ferry Bridge in Burton-on-Trent, Staffordshire (1889), where the chains are not attached to abutments as is usual, but instead are attached to the main girders, which are thus in compression. Here, the chains are made from flat wrought iron plates, eight inches (203 mm) wide by an inch and a half (38 mm) thick, rivetted together.

=== Wire-cable ===
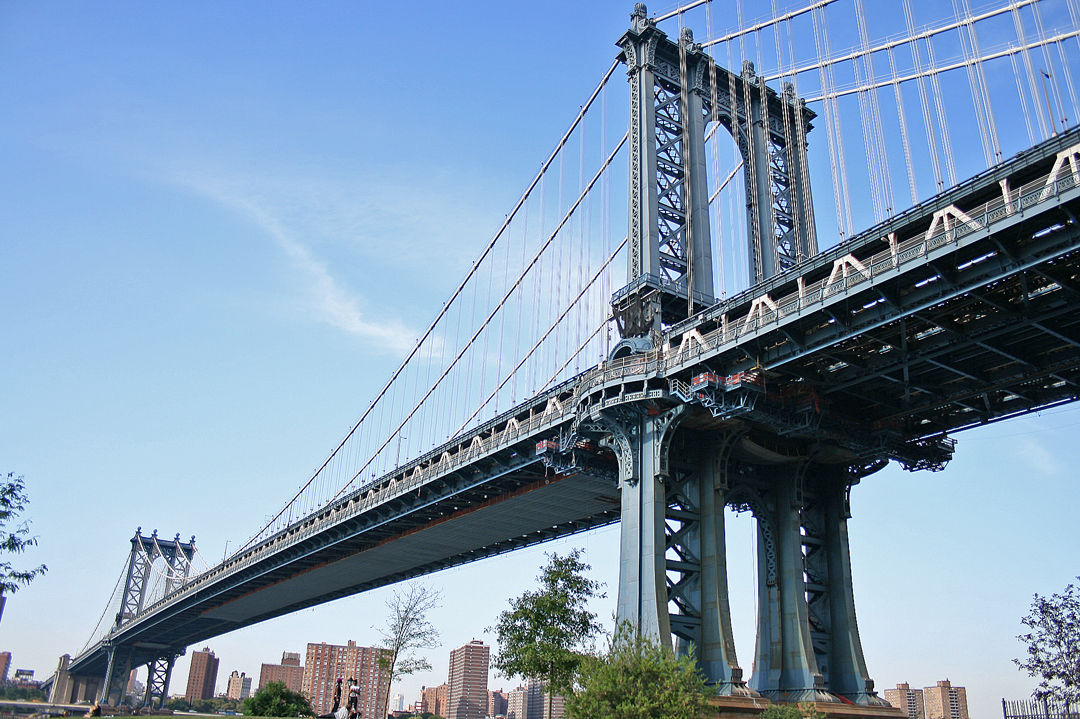
The Manhattan Bridge, connecting Manhattan and Brooklyn in New York City, opened in 1909 and is considered to be the forerunner of modern suspension bridges; its design served as the model for many of the long-span suspension bridges around the world.

The first wire-cable suspension bridge was the Spider Bridge at Falls of Schuylkill (1816), a modest and temporary footbridge built following the collapse of James Finley's nearby Chain Bridge at Falls of Schuylkill (1808). The footbridge's span was 124 m, although its deck was only 0.45 m wide.

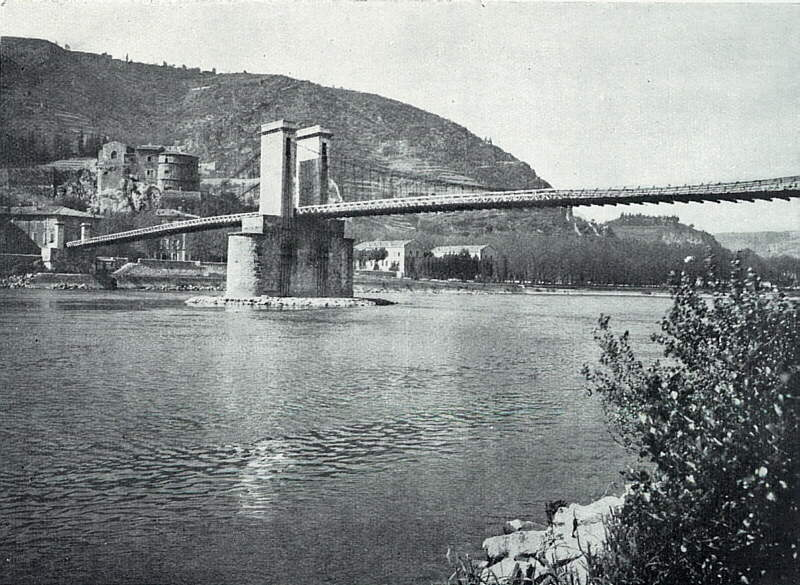
Marc Seguin suspension bridge near Annonay, 1825

Development of wire-cable suspension bridges dates to the temporary simple suspension bridge at Annonay built by Marc Seguin and his brothers in 1822. It spanned only 18 m. The first permanent wire cable suspension bridge was Guillaume Henri Dufour's Saint Antoine Bridge in Geneva of 1823, with two 40 m spans. The first with cables assembled in mid-air in the modern method was Joseph Chaley's Grand Pont Suspendu in Fribourg, in 1834.

In the United States, the first major wire-cable suspension bridge was the Wire Bridge at Fairmount in Philadelphia, Pennsylvania. Designed by Charles Ellet Jr. and completed in 1842, it had a span of 109 m. Ellet's Niagara Falls suspension bridge (1847–48) was abandoned before completion. It was used as scaffolding for John A. Roebling's double decker railroad and carriage bridge (1855).

The Otto Beit Bridge (1938–1939) was the first modern suspension bridge outside the United States built with parallel wire cables.

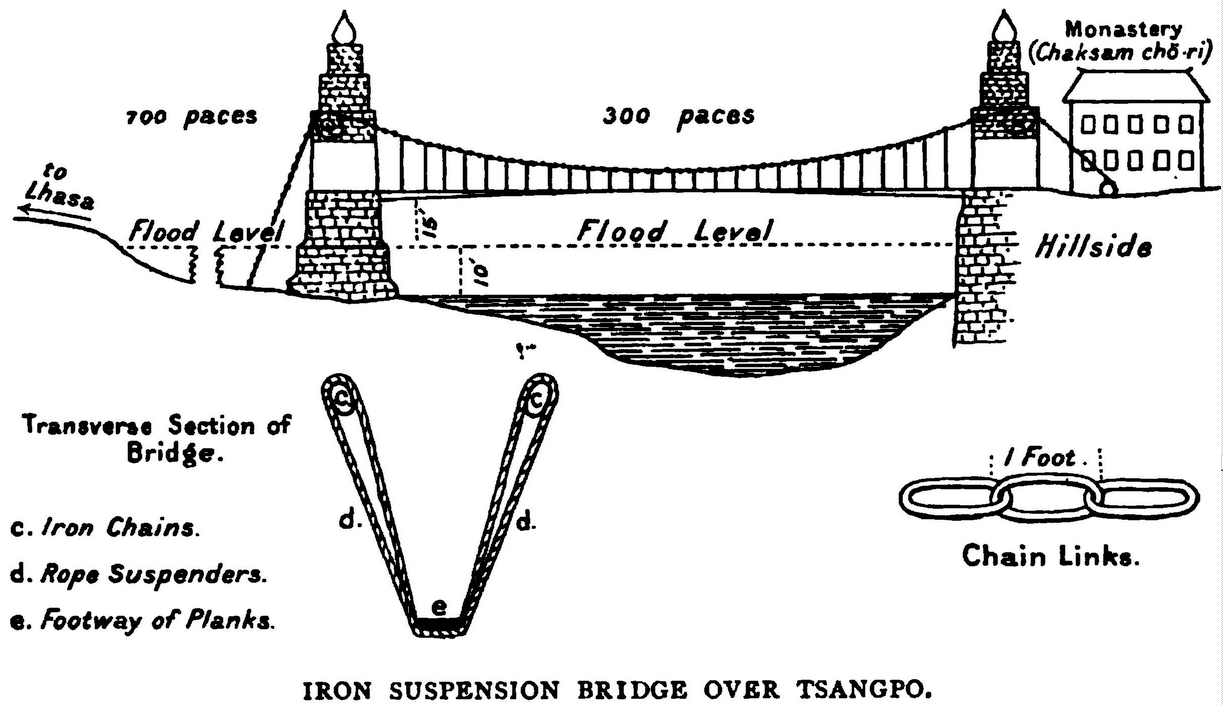
Drawing of the Tibetan-built Chaksam bridge south of Lhasa, constructed in 1430, with long chains suspended between towers, and vertical suspender ropes carrying the weight of a planked footway below.

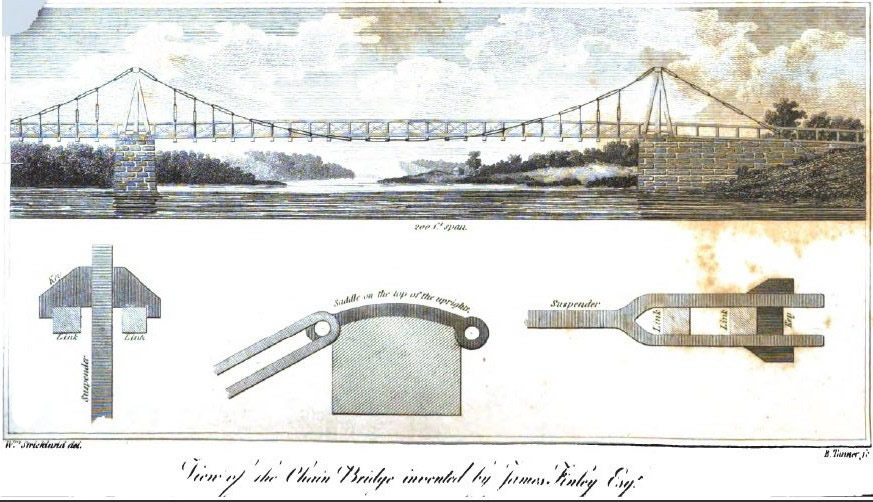
View of the Chain Bridge invented by James Finley Esq. (1810) by William Strickland. Finley's Chain Bridge at Falls of Schuylkill (1808) had two spans, 100 feet, and 200 feet.

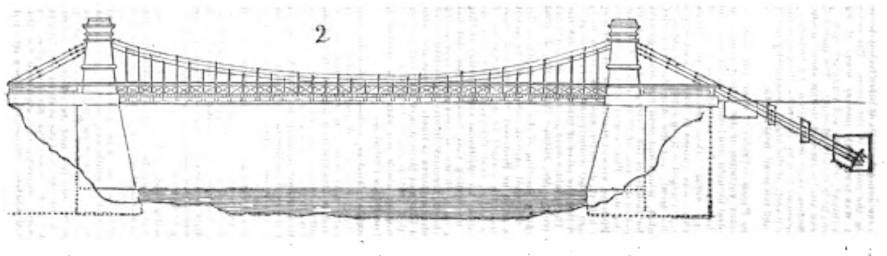
Sagar Iron Suspension Bridge, by Major Presgrave, 1828–1830, near Sanodha, Sagar district India constructed using locally produced iron.

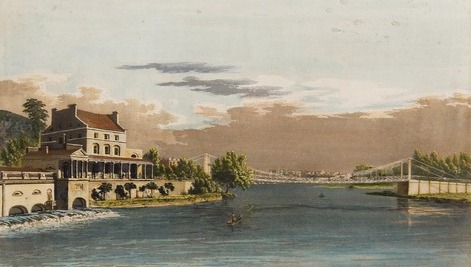
Wire Bridge at Fairmount (1842, replaced 1874).

== Structure ==
=== Bridge main components ===
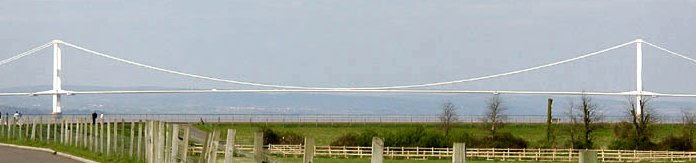
The slender lines of the Severn Bridge

Two towers/pillars, two suspension cables, four suspension cable anchors, multiple suspender cables, the bridge deck.

=== Structural analysis ===
Comparison of a catenary (black dotted curve) and a parabola (red solid curve) with the same span and sag. The main forces in a suspension bridge of any type are tension in the cables and compression in the pillars. Since almost all the force on the pillars is vertically downwards, and the bridge is also stabilized by the main cables, the pillars can be made quite slender, as on the Severn Bridge, on the Wales-England border. In a suspended deck bridge, cables suspended via towers hold up the road deck. The weight is transferred by the cables to the towers, which in turn transfer the weight to the ground. More details The catenary represents the profile of a simple suspension bridge or the cable of a suspended-deck suspension bridge on which its deck and hangers have negligible mass compared to its cable. The parabola represents the profile of the cable of a suspended-deck suspension bridge on which its cable and hangers have negligible mass compared to its deck. The profile of the cable of a real suspension bridge with the same span and sag lies between the two curves.

The main cables of a suspension bridge will form a catenary when hanging under their own weight only. When supporting the deck, the cables will instead form a parabola, assuming the weight of the cables is small compared to the weight of the deck. One can see the shape from the constant increase of the gradient of the cable with linear (deck) distance, this increase in gradient at each connection with the deck providing a net upward support force. Combined with the relatively simple constraints placed upon the actual deck, that makes the suspension bridge much simpler to design and analyze than a cable-stayed bridge in which the deck is in compression.

=== Comparison with cable-stayed bridge ===
Cable-stayed bridges and suspension bridges may appear to be similar, but are quite different in principle and in their construction.

In suspension bridges, large main cables (normally two) hang between the towers and are anchored at each end to the ground. The main cables, which are free to move on bearings in the towers, bear the load of the bridge deck. Before the deck is installed, the cables are under tension from their own weight. Along the main cables smaller cables or rods connect to the bridge deck, which is lifted in sections. As this is done, the tension in the cables increases, as it does with the live load of traffic crossing the bridge. The tension on the main cables is transferred to the ground at the anchorages and by downwards compression on the towers.

Difference between types of bridges

Suspension bridge

Cable-stayed bridge, fan design

In cable-stayed bridges, the towers are the primary load-bearing structures that transmit the bridge loads to the ground. A cantilever approach is often used to support the bridge deck near the towers, but lengths further from them are supported by cables running directly to the towers. By design, all static horizontal forces of the cable-stayed bridge are balanced so that the supporting towers do not tend to tilt or slide and so must only resist horizontal forces from the live loads.

=== Advantages ===
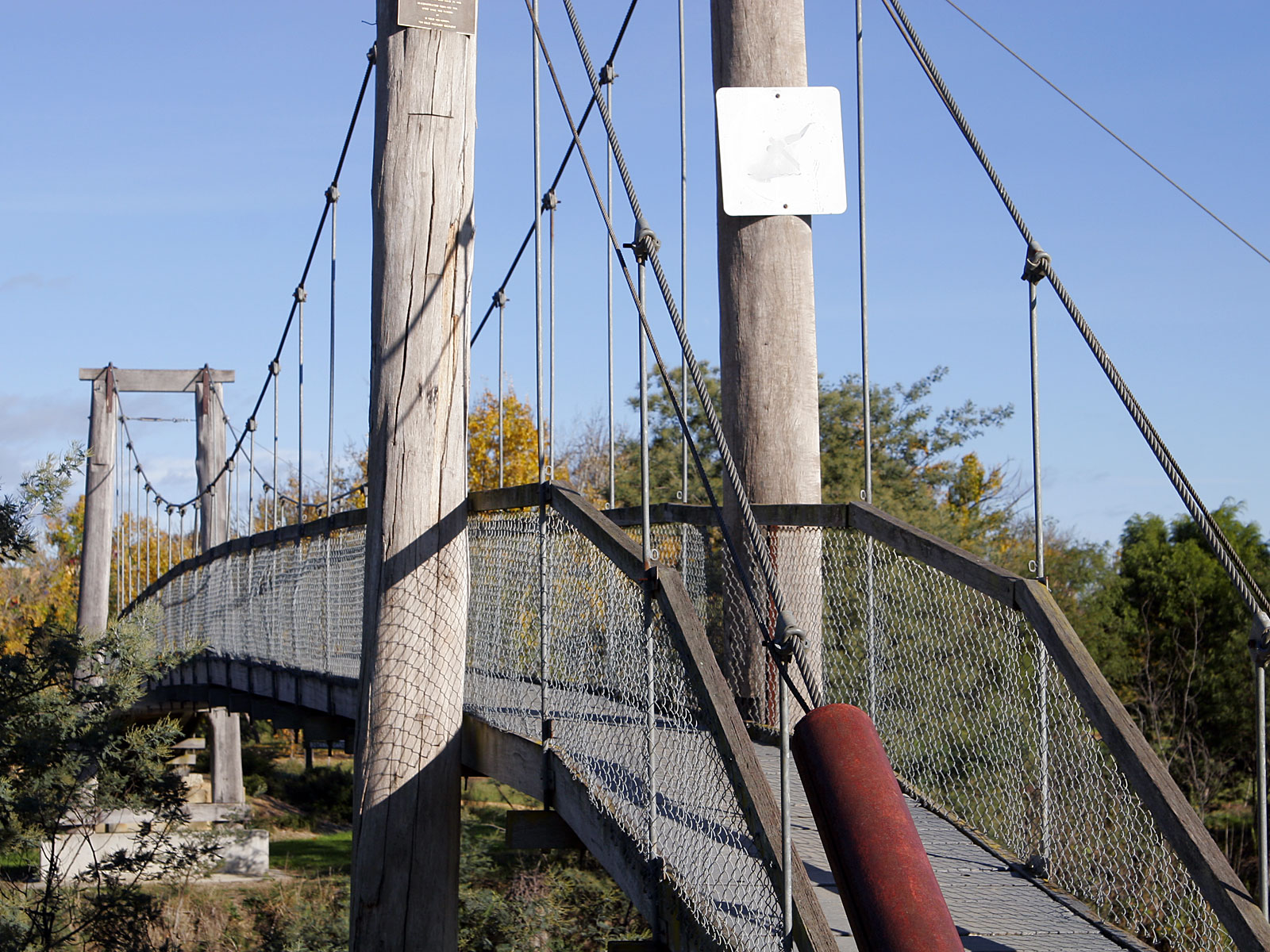
A suspension bridge can be made out of simple materials such as wood and common wire rope.

- Longer main spans are more achievable than with any other type of bridge.
- Less material may be required than other bridge types, even at spans they can achieve, leading to a reduced construction cost.
- Except for installation of the initial temporary cables, little or no access from below is required during construction and so a waterway can remain open while the bridge is built above.
- They may be better able to withstand earthquake movements than heavier and more rigid bridges.
- Bridge decks can have deck sections replaced in order to widen traffic lanes for larger vehicles or add additional width for separated cycling/pedestrian paths.

=== Disadvantages ===
- Considerable stiffness or aerodynamic profiling may be required to prevent the bridge deck from vibrating under high winds.
- The relatively low deck stiffness compared to other (non-suspension) types of bridges makes it more difficult to carry heavy rail traffic in which high concentrated live loads occur.
- Some access below may be required during construction to lift the initial cables or to lift deck units. That access can often be avoided in cable-stayed bridge construction.

== Variations ==
=== Underspanned ===
In an underspanned suspension bridge, also called under-deck cable-stayed bridge, the main cables hang entirely below the bridge deck, but are still anchored into the ground in a similar way to the conventional type. Very few bridges of this nature have been built, as the deck is inherently less stable than when suspended below the cables. Examples include the Pont des Bergues of 1834 designed by Guillaume Henri Dufour; James Smith's Micklewood Bridge; and a proposal by Robert Stevenson for a bridge over the River Almond near Edinburgh.

Roebling's Delaware Aqueduct (begun 1847) consists of three sections supported by cables. The timber structure essentially hides the cables; and from a quick view, it is not immediately apparent that it is even a suspension bridge.

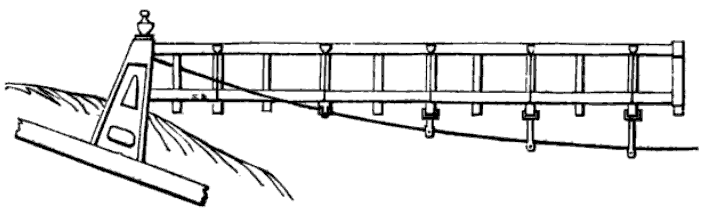
Micklewood Bridge as illustrated by Charles Drewry, 1832

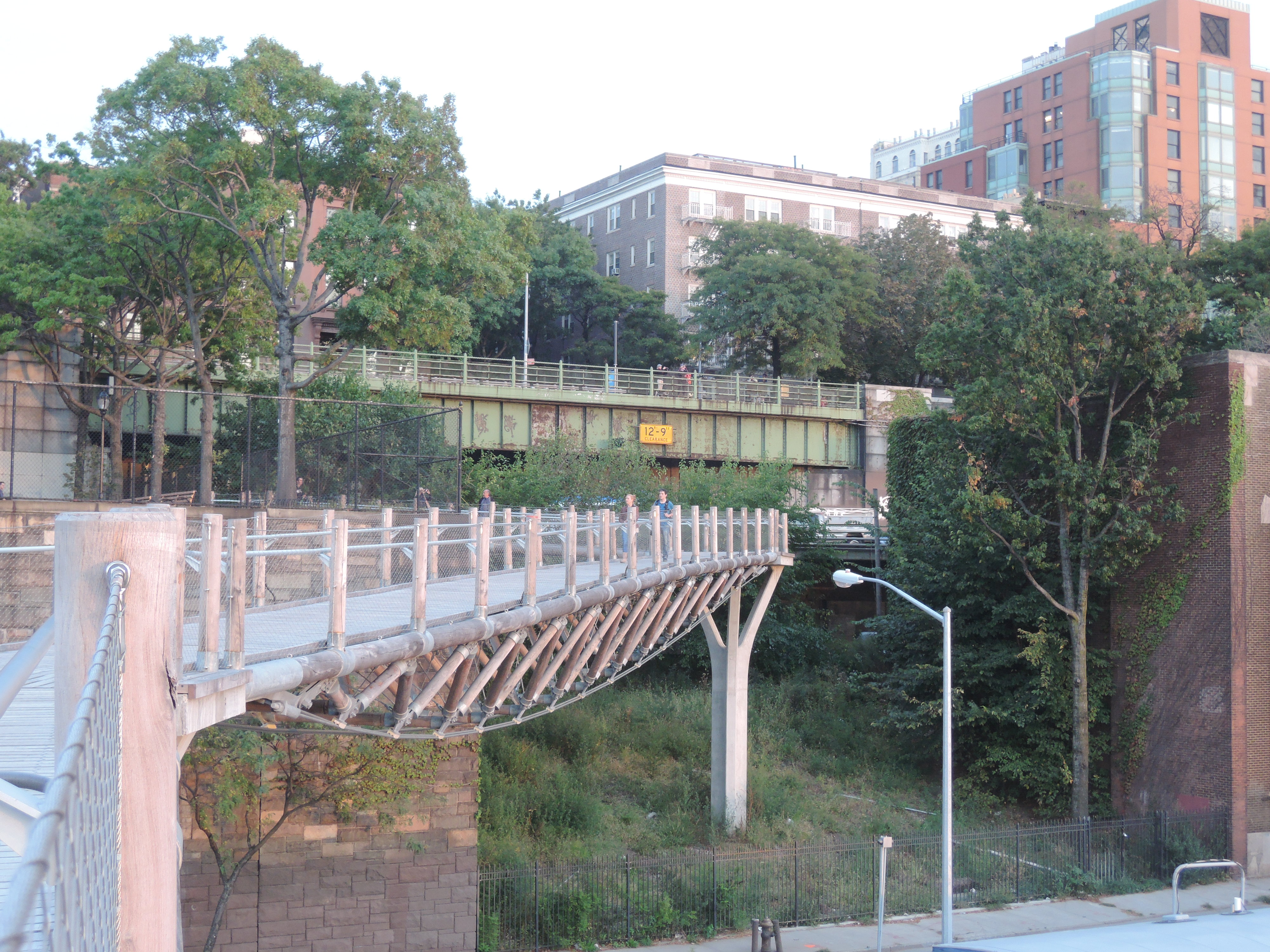
Squibb Park Bridge, Brooklyn, built 2013

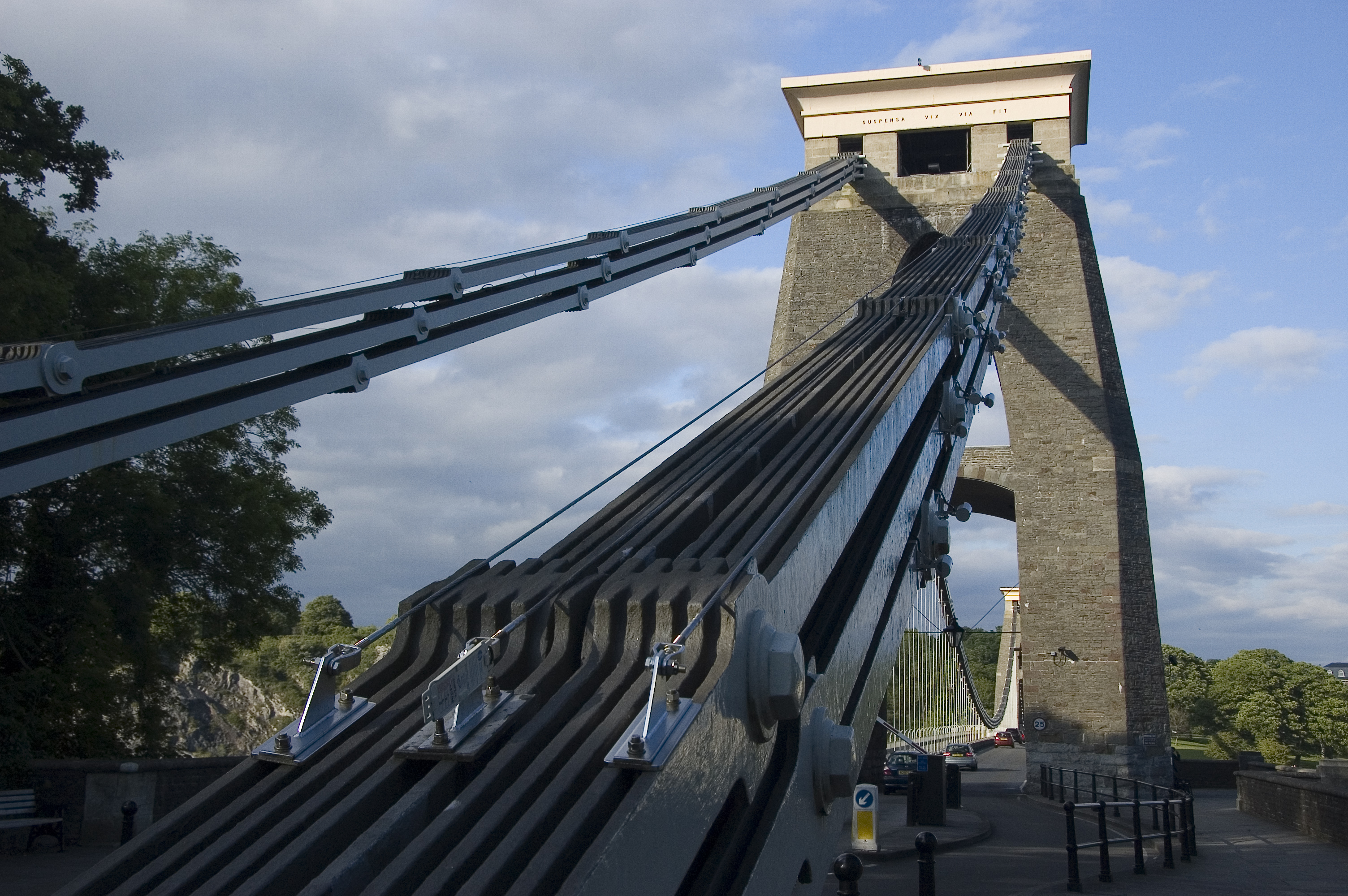
Eyebar chain cables of Clifton Suspension Bridge

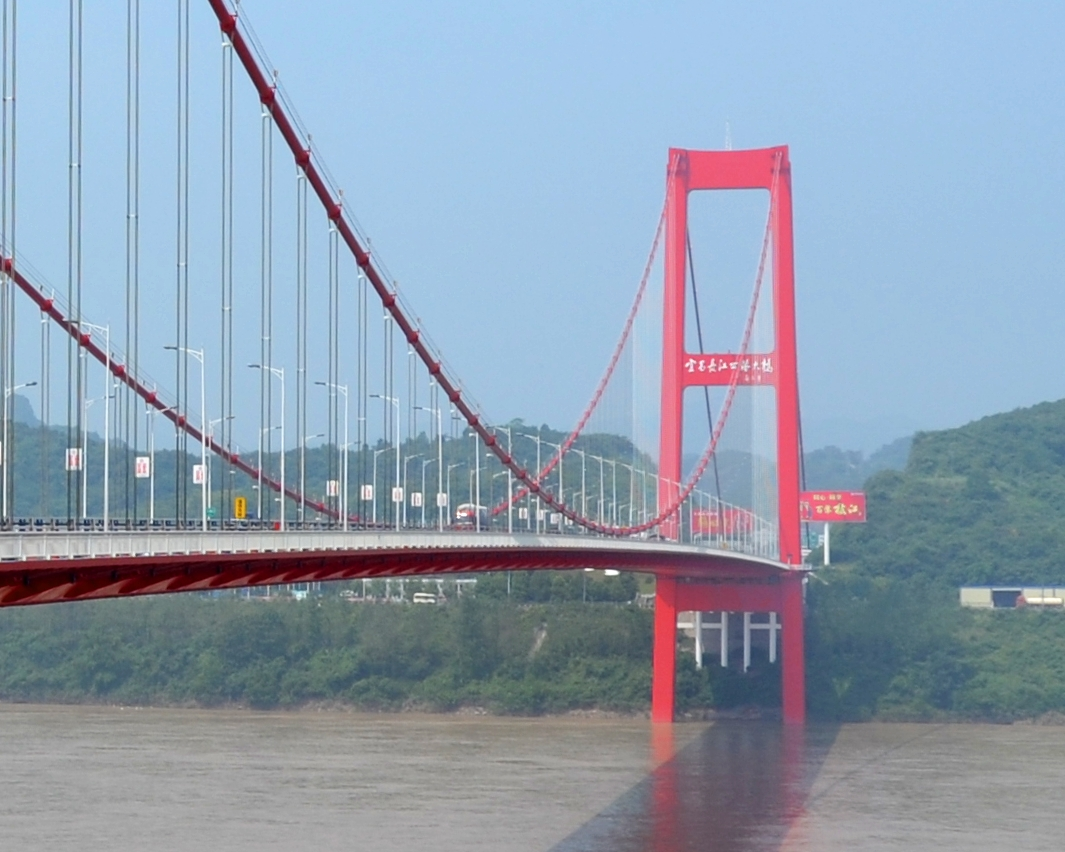
The Yichang Bridge, a plate deck suspension bridge, over the Yangtze River in China

=== Suspension cable types ===
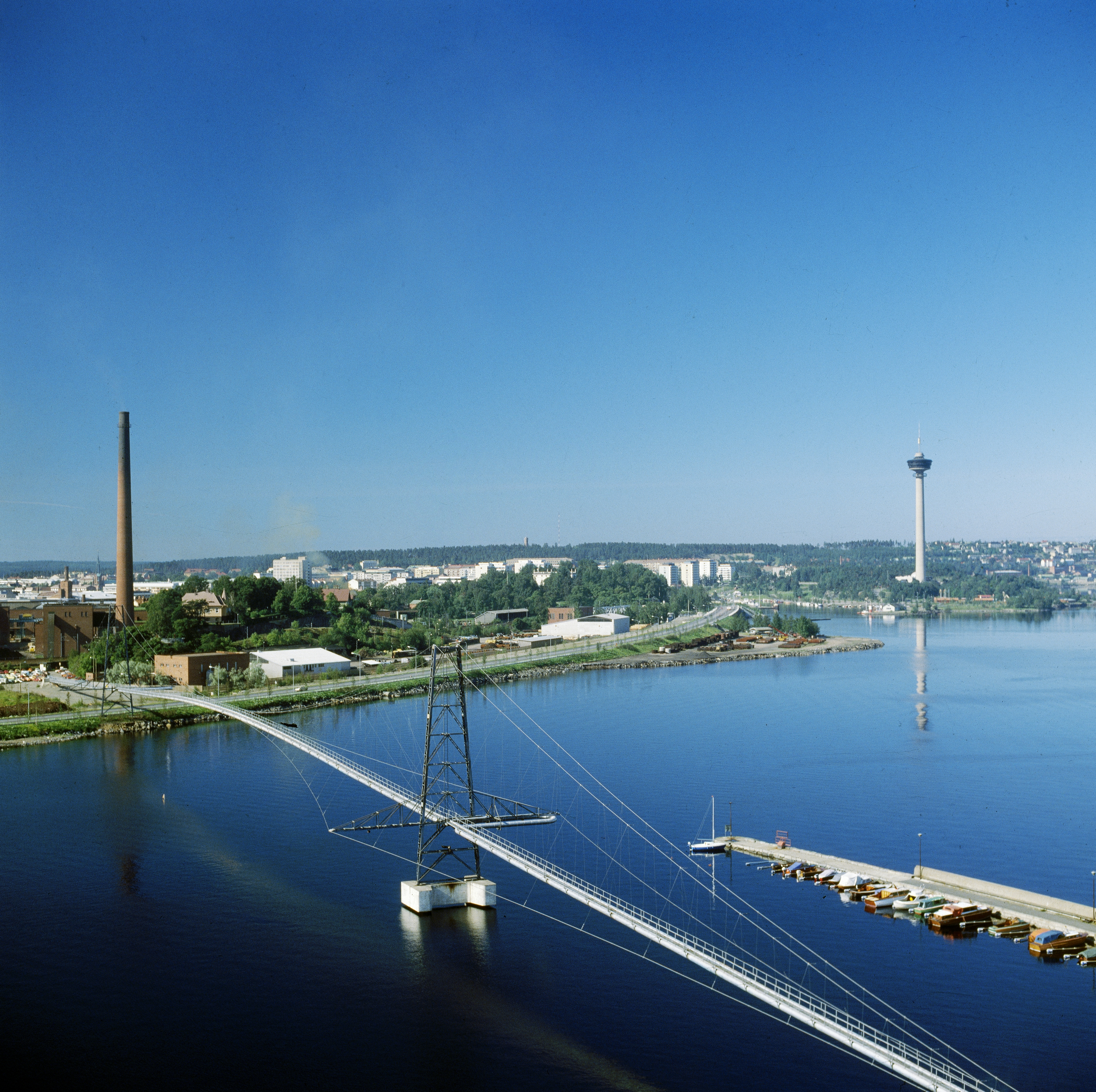
A former steam pipeline suspension bridge on the Lake Näsijärvi in Tampere, Finland, in 1979

The main suspension cables in older bridges were often made from a chain or linked bars, but modern bridge cables are made from multiple strands of wire rope. This not only adds strength but improves reliability (often called redundancy in engineering terms) because the failure of a few flawed strands in the hundreds used pose very little threat of failure, whereas a single bad link or eyebar can cause failure of an entire bridge. (The failure of a single eyebar was found to be the cause of the collapse of the Silver Bridge over the Ohio River.) Another reason is that as spans increased, engineers were unable to lift larger chains into position, whereas wire strand cables can be formulated one by one in mid-air from a temporary walkway.

==== Suspender-cable terminations ====
Poured sockets are used to make a high strength, permanent cable termination. They are created by inserting the suspender wire rope (at the bridge deck supports) into the narrow end of a conical cavity that is oriented in-line with the intended direction of strain. The individual wires are splayed out inside the cone or capel, and the cone is then filled with molten lead-antimony-tin (Pb80Sb15Sn5) solder.

=== Deck structure types ===
Most suspension bridges have open truss structures to support the roadbed, particularly owing to the unfavorable effects of using plate girders, discovered from the collapse of the Tacoma Narrows Bridge (1940). In the 1960s, developments in bridge aerodynamics allowed the re-introduction of plate structures as shallow box girders, first seen on the Severn bridge, built 1961–1966. In the picture of the Yichang Bridge, note the very sharp entry edge and sloping undergirders in the suspension bridge shown. This enables this type of construction to be used without the danger of vortex shedding and consequent aeroelastic effects, such as those that destroyed the original Tacoma Narrows bridge.

== Forces ==
Three kinds of forces operate on any bridge: the dead load, the live load, and the dynamic load. Dead load refers to the weight of the bridge itself. Like any other structure, a bridge has a tendency to collapse simply because of the gravitational forces acting on the materials of which the bridge is made. Live load refers to traffic that moves across the bridge as well as normal environmental factors such as changes in temperature, precipitation, and winds. Dynamic load refers to environmental factors that go beyond normal weather conditions, factors such as sudden gusts of wind and earthquakes. All three factors must be taken into consideration when building a bridge.

=== Use other than road and rail ===
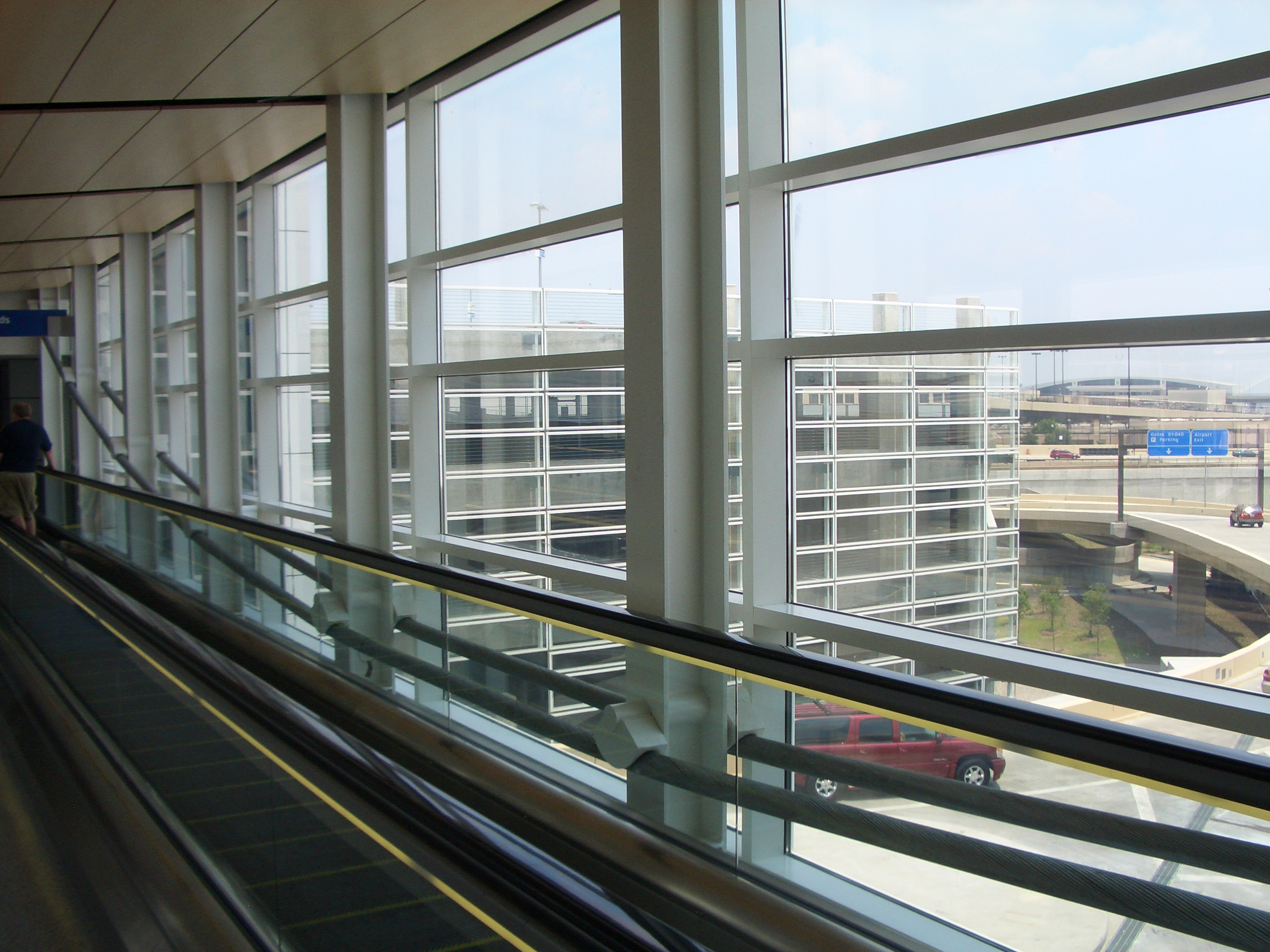
Cable-suspended footbridge at Dallas Fort Worth Airport Terminal D

The principles of suspension used on a large scale also appear in contexts less dramatic than road or rail bridges. Light cable suspension may prove less expensive and seem more elegant for a cycle or footbridge than strong girder supports. An example of this is the Nescio Bridge in the Netherlands, and the Roebling-designed 1904 Riegelsville suspension pedestrian bridge across the Delaware River in Pennsylvania. The longest pedestrian suspension bridge, which spans the River Paiva, Arouca Geopark, Portugal, opened in April 2021. The 516-meter bridge hangs 175 meters above the river.

Where such a bridge spans a gap between two buildings, there is no need to construct towers, as the buildings can anchor the cables. Cable suspension may also be augmented by the inherent stiffness of a structure that has much in common with a tubular bridge.

== Construction sequence (wire strand cable type) ==
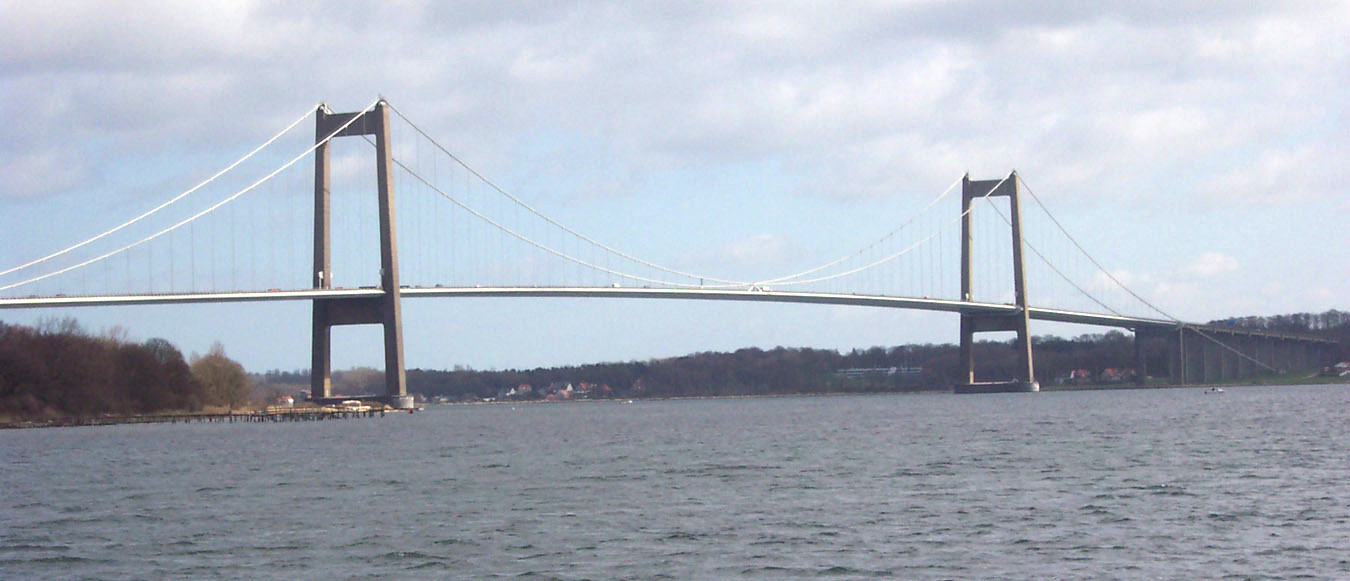
The Little Belt suspension bridge in Denmark was opened in 1970.

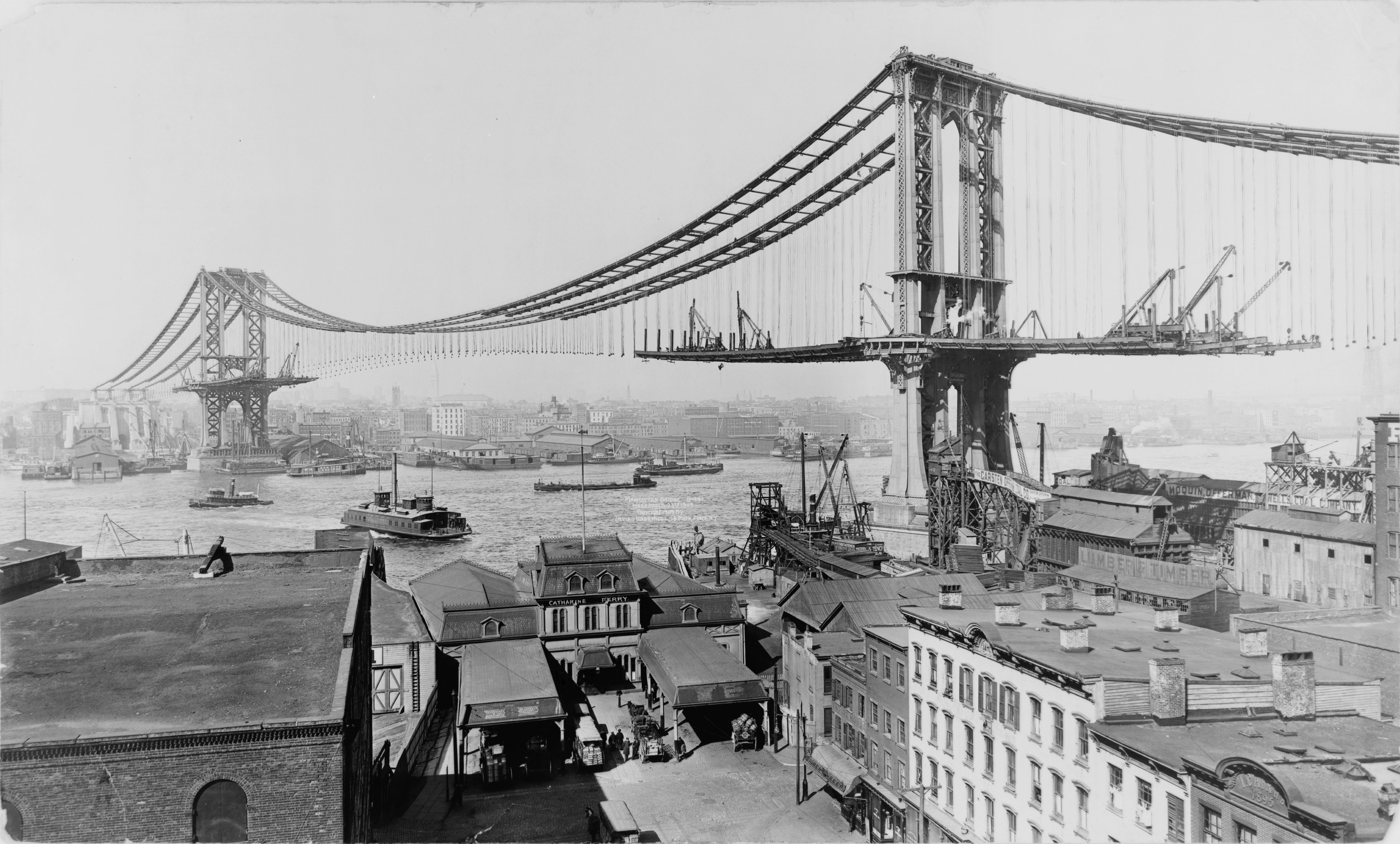
Manhattan Bridge in New York City with deck under construction from the towers outward.

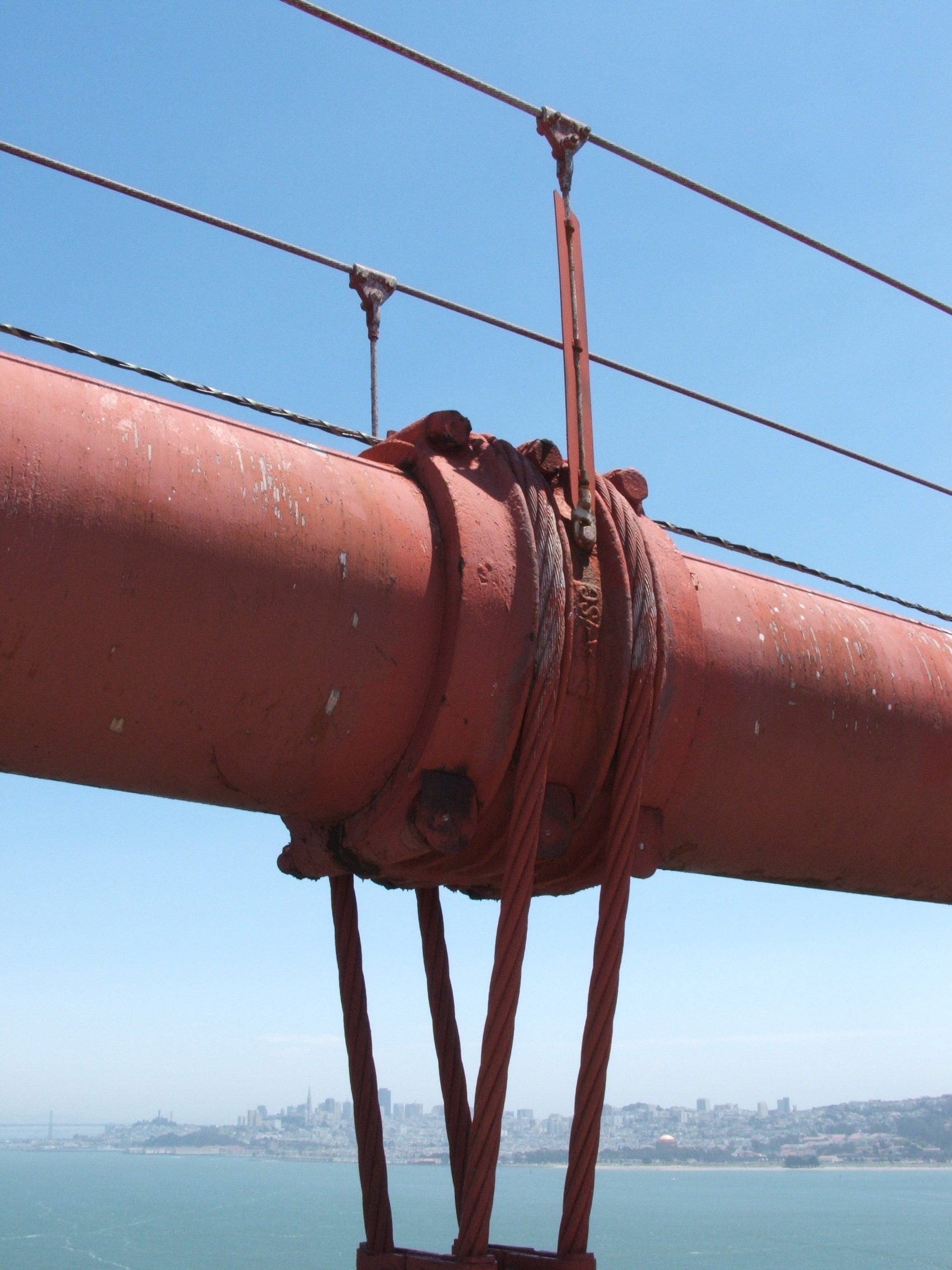
Suspender cables and suspender cable band on the Golden Gate Bridge in San Francisco. Main cable diameter is 36 inches (910 mm), and suspender cable diameter is 3.5 inches (89 mm).

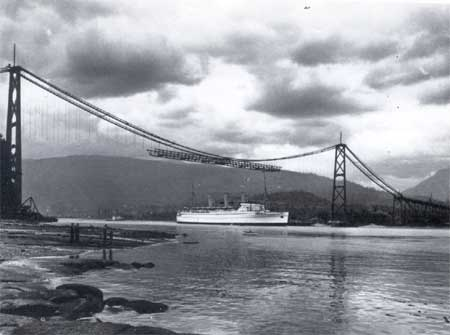
Lions' Gate Bridge with deck under construction from the span's center

Typical suspension bridges are constructed using a sequence generally described as follows. Depending on length and size, construction may take anywhere between a year and a half (construction of the original Tacoma Narrows Bridge took only 19 months) and a decade (as with the Akashi Kaikyo Bridge).

1. Where the towers are founded on underwater piers, caissons are sunk and any soft bottom is excavated for a foundation. If the bedrock is too deep to be exposed by excavation or the sinking of a caisson, pilings are driven to the bedrock or into overlying hard soil, or a large concrete pad to distribute the weight over less resistant soil may be constructed, first preparing the surface with a bed of compacted gravel. (Such a pad footing can also accommodate the movements of an active fault, and this has been implemented on the foundations of the cable-stayed Rio-Antirio bridge.) The piers are then extended above water level, where they are capped with pedestal bases for the towers.
2. Where the towers are founded on dry land, deep foundation excavation or pilings are used.
3. From the tower foundation, towers of single or multiple columns are erected using high-strength reinforced concrete, stonework, or steel. Concrete is used most frequently in modern suspension bridge construction due to the high cost of steel.
4. Large devices called saddles, which will carry the main suspension cables, are positioned atop the towers. Typically of cast steel, they can also be manufactured using riveted forms, and are equipped with rollers to allow the main cables to shift under construction and normal loads.
5. Anchorages are constructed, usually in tandem with the towers, to resist the tension of the cables and form as the main anchor system for the entire structure. These are usually anchored in good quality rock but may consist of massive reinforced concrete deadweights within an excavation. The anchorage structure will have multiple protruding open eyebolts enclosed within a secure space.
6. Temporary suspended walkways, called catwalks, are then built using a set of guide wires hoisted into place via winches positioned atop the towers. These catwalks follow the curve set by bridge designers for the main cables, in a path mathematically described as a catenary arc. Typical catwalks are usually between eight and ten feet wide and are constructed using wire grate and wood slats.
7. Gantries are placed upon the catwalks, which will support the main cable spinning reels. Then, cables attached to winches are installed, and in turn, the main cable spinning devices are installed.
8. High strength wire (typically 4 or 6 gauge galvanized steel wire), is pulled in a loop by pulleys on the traveler, with one end affixed at an anchorage. When the traveler reaches the opposite anchorage the loop is placed over an open anchor eyebar. Along the catwalk, workers also pull the cable wires to their desired tension. This continues until a bundle, called a "cable strand" is completed, and temporarily bundled using stainless steel wire. This process is repeated until the final cable strand is completed. Workers then remove the individual wraps on the cable strands (during the spinning process, the shape of the main cable closely resembles a hexagon), and then the entire cable is then compressed by a traveling hydraulic press into a closely packed cylinder and tightly wrapped with additional wire to form the final circular cross-section. The wire used in suspension bridge construction is a galvanized steel wire that has been coated with corrosion inhibitors.
9. At specific points along the main cable (each being the exact distance horizontally in relation to the next) devices called "cable bands" are installed to carry steel wire ropes called suspender cables. Each suspender cable is engineered and cut to precise lengths, and are looped over the cable bands. In some bridges, where the towers are close to or on the shore, the suspender cables may be applied only to the central span. Early suspender cables were fitted with zinc jewels and a set of steel washers, which formed the support for the deck. Modern suspender cables carry a shackle-type fitting.
10. Special lifting hoists attached to the suspenders or from the main cables are used to lift prefabricated sections of the bridge deck to the proper level, provided that the local conditions allow the sections to be carried below the bridge by barge or other means. Otherwise, a traveling cantilever derrick may be used to extend the deck one section at a time starting from the towers and working outward. If the addition of the deck structure extends from the towers the finished portions of the deck will pitch upward rather sharply, as there is no downward force in the center of the span. Upon completion of the deck, the added load will pull the main cables into an arc mathematically described as a parabola, while the arc of the deck will be as the designer intended – usually a gentle upward arc for added clearance if over a shipping channel, or flat in other cases such as a span over a canyon. Arched suspension spans also give the structure more rigidity and strength.
11. With the completion of the primary structure various details such as lighting, handrails, finish painting and paving is installed or completed.

== Longest spans ==
Suspension bridges are typically ranked by the length of their main span. These are the ten bridges with the longest spans, followed by the length of the span and the year the bridge opened for traffic:

Bridge	Country	Length	Year
Çanakkale 1915 Bridge	Turkey	2023 m (6637 ft)	2022
Akashi Kaikyō Bridge	Japan	1991 m (6532 ft)	1998
Yangsigang Bridge	China	1700 m (5577 ft)	2019
Xihoumen Bridge	China	1650 m (5413 ft)	2009
Great Belt Bridge	Denmark	1624 m (5328 ft)	1998
Osman Gazi Bridge	Turkey	1550 m (5085 ft)	2016
Lee Sun-shin Bridge	South Korea	1545 m (5069 ft)	2012
Runyang Bridge	China	1490 m (4888 ft)	2005
Fourth Nanjing Yangtze Bridge	China	1418 m (4652 ft)	2012
Humber Bridge	United Kingdom	1410 m (4626 ft)	1981
Yavuz Sultan Selim Bridge	Turkey	1408 m (4619 ft)	2016

== Other examples ==
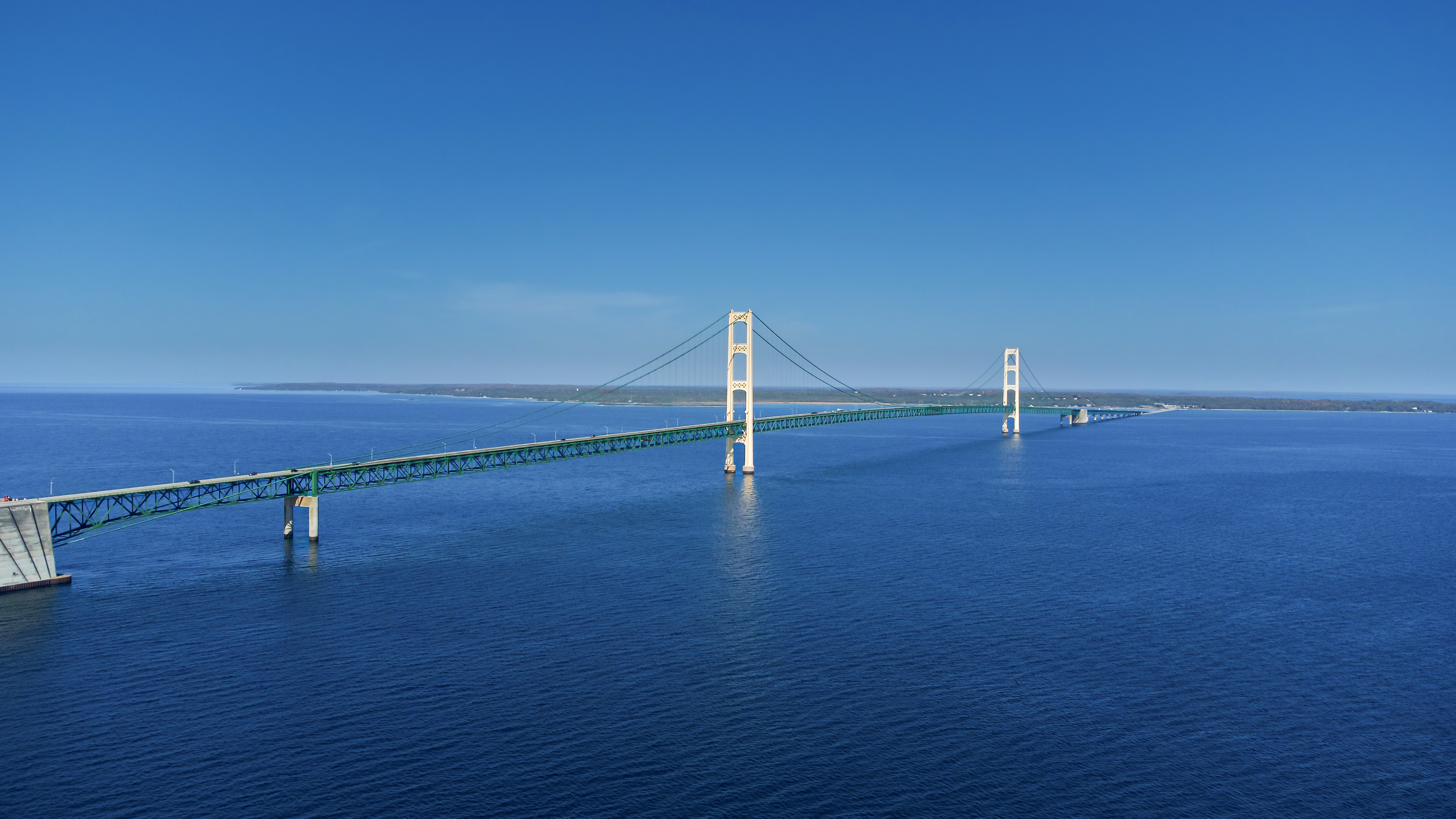
The Mackinac Bridge in Michigan, opened in 1957

(Chronological)

- Union Bridge (England/Scotland, 1820), the longest span (137 m) from 1820 to 1826. The oldest suspension bridge in the world still carrying road traffic.
- Roebling's Delaware Aqueduct (USA, 1847), the oldest wire suspension bridge still in service in the United States.
- John A. Roebling Suspension Bridge (USA, 1866), then the longest wire suspension bridge in the world at 1,057 feet (322 m) main span.
- Brooklyn Bridge (USA, 1883), the first steel-wire suspension bridge.
- Bear Mountain Bridge (USA, 1924), the longest suspension span (497 m) from 1924 to 1926. The first suspension bridge to have a concrete deck. The construction methods pioneered in building it would make possible several much larger projects to follow.
- Benjamin Franklin Bridge (USA, 1926), replaced Bear Mountain Bridge as the longest span at 1,750 feet between the towers. Includes an active subway line and never-used trolley stations on the span.
- San Francisco–Oakland Bay Bridge eastern span (USA, 2013). The eastern portion is a self-anchored suspension bridge, the longest of its type in the world. It replaced a cantilever bridge.
- Golden Gate Bridge (USA, 1937), the longest suspension bridge from 1937 to 1964. It was also the world's tallest bridge from 1937 to 1993, and remains the tallest bridge in the United States.
- Mackinac Bridge (USA, 1957), the longest suspension bridge between anchorages in the Western hemisphere.
- Si Du River Bridge (China, 2009), the highest bridge in the world, with its deck around 500 meters above the surface of the river.
- 1915 Çanakkale Bridge (Turkey, 2022), has the longest main span of any suspension bridge in the world, crosses the Dardanelles, has a main span of 2,023 meters.

== Notable collapses ==
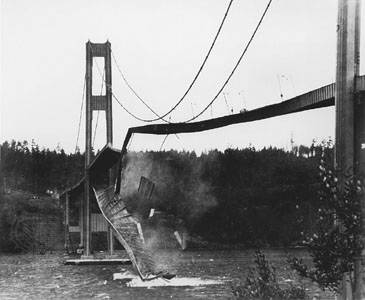
The Tacoma Narrows Bridge collapse on 7 November 1940

Broughton Suspension Bridge (England) was an iron chain bridge built in 1826. One of Europe's first suspension bridges, it collapsed in 1831 due to mechanical resonance induced by troops marching in step. As a result of the incident, the British Army issued an order that troops should "break step" when crossing a bridge.

Silver Bridge (USA) was an eyebar chain highway bridge, built in 1928, that collapsed in late 1967, killing forty-six people. The bridge had a low-redundancy design that was difficult to inspect. The collapse inspired legislation to ensure that older bridges were regularly inspected and maintained. Following the collapse a bridge of similar design was immediately closed and eventually demolished. A second similarly-designed bridge had been built with a higher margin of safety and remained in service until 1991.

The Tacoma Narrows Bridge, (USA), 1940, was vulnerable to structural vibration in sustained and moderately strong winds due to its plate-girder deck structure. Wind caused a phenomenon called aeroelastic fluttering that led to its collapse only months after completion. The collapse was captured on film. There were no human deaths in the collapse; several drivers escaped their cars on foot and reached the anchorages before the span dropped.

Yarmouth suspension bridge (England) was built in 1829 and collapsed in 1845, killing 79 people.

Peace River Suspension Bridge (Canada), which was completed in 1943, collapsed when the north anchor's soil support for the suspension bridge failed in October 1957. The entire bridge subsequently collapsed.

Kutai Kartanegara Bridge (Indonesia) over the Mahakam River, located in Kutai Kartanegara Regency, East Kalimantan district on the Indonesia island of Borneo, was built in 1995, completed in 2001 and collapsed in 2011. Dozens of vehicles on the bridge fell into the Mahakam River. As a result of this incident, 24 people died and dozens of others were injured and were treated at the Aji Muhammad Parikesit Regional Hospital. Meanwhile, 12 people were reported missing, 31 people were seriously injured, and 8 people had minor injuries. Research findings indicate that the collapse was largely caused by the construction failure of the vertical hanging clamp. It was also found that poor maintenance, fatigue in the cable hanger construction materials, material quality, and bridge loads that exceed vehicle capacity, can also have an impact on bridge collapse. In 2013 the Kutai Kartanegara Bridge rebuilt the same location and completed in 2015 with a Through arch bridge design.

On 30 October 2022, Jhulto Pul, a pedestrian suspension bridge over the Machchhu River in the city of Morbi, Gujarat, India, collapsed, leading to the deaths of at least 141 people.

== See also ==
- Cable-stayed suspension bridge
- Floating cable-stayed bridge
- Floating suspension bridge
- List of longest suspension bridge spans
- Timeline of three longest spans—Whether bridge, aerial tramway, powerline, ceiling or dome etc.
- Steel bridge

== Bibliography ==
- Okukawa, Atsushi; Suzuki, Shuichi; Harazaki, Ikuo (2014). "Suspension Bridges". In Chen, Wai-Fah; Duan, Lian (eds.). Bridge Engineering Handbook: Superstructure Design (2nd ed.). Boca Raton, Florida: CRC Press. pp. 363–398. doi:10.1201/b16523. ISBN 978-0-429-10507-4.
- Pipinato, A. (2016). "The history, aesthetics, and design of bridges". In Pipinato, Alessio (ed.). Innovative Bridge Design Handbook. Construction, Rehabilitation and Maintenance. Butterworth-Heinemann. pp. 3–17. doi:10.1016/B978-0-12-800058-8.00001-3. ISBN 978-0-12-800058-8.
- Kawada, Tadaki (2010). Scott, Richard (ed.). History of the Modern Suspension Bridge: Solving the Dilemma between Economy and Stiffness. Translated by Ohashi, Harukazu. Reston, Virginia: ASCE Press. doi:10.1061/9780784410189. ISBN 9780784410189.
