= Chain Bridge at Falls of Schuylkill =

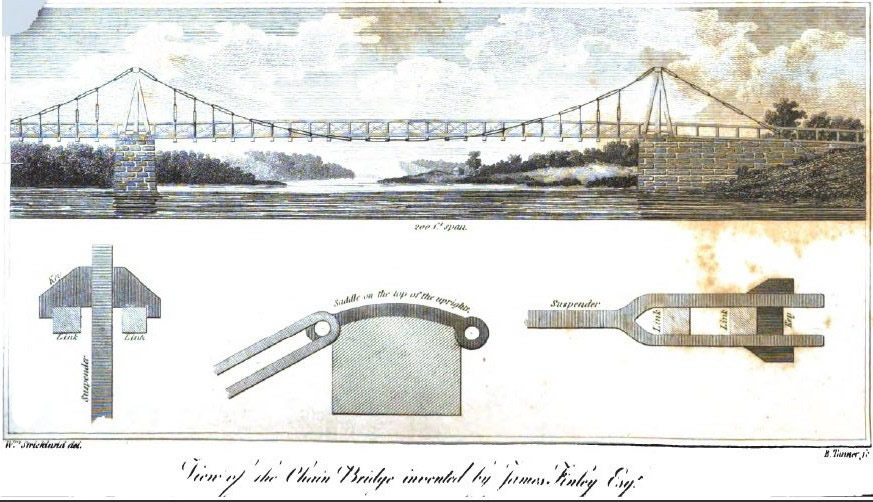
- "View of the Chain Bridge invented by James Finley Esq." William Strickland, The Portfolio, June 1810.
- Coordinates: 40.0064°N 75.1927°W
- Crossed: Schuylkill River
- Locale: Philadelphia, Pennsylvania

Characteristics
- Material: Wrought iron chain
- Total length: 306 feet (93 m)
- Width: 18 feet (5.5 m)
- No. of spans: 2 unequal spans

History
- Designer: James Finley
- Opened: 1808
- Collapsed: 1816

Chain Bridge at Falls of Schuylkill was an 1808 iron-chain suspension bridge built across the Schuylkill River, north of Philadelphia, Pennsylvania. Designed by inventor James Finley, it became the model for his later chain suspension bridges. It collapsed in 1816 under a heavy load of snow.

== History ==
The Chain Bridge had two spans: an eastern one of 200 feet (60.96 m), and a western one of about 100 feet (30.48 m). The bridge's chain cables were carried over paired A-frame wooden towers on its east and west abutments, and a third pair of towers atop a stone pier built in the river.

Its chains were made of 1.5-inch-square (3.8 cm) iron bar wrought into links of between 8 and 12 feet (2.44 and 3.66 m) in length. These were used for both the cables and the vertical suspenders. The suspenders were attached to 10-by-5-inch (25.4 cm x 12.7 cm) wooden joists spaced 10 feet (3 m) apart, and covered by a 2.5-inch-thick (6.4 cm) wooden deck that was 18 feet (5.5 m) wide and 306 feet (93.26 m) long.

Although Finley patented his Falls of Schuylkill bridge and publicized it widely, it was not a success. "Part of the superstructure broke down in September, 1810, while a drove of cattle was crossing it, and in January, 1816, the bridge fell down, occasioned by the great weight of snow which remained on it, and a decayed piece of timber." A wooden covered bridge was built upon the Chain Bridge's abutments in 1818, but washed away in 1822.

The Philadelphia & Reading Railway Bridge (1853–56, still in use) crosses the Schuylkill at the approximate location of the Chain Bridge.

== Images ==
The illustration above (drawn by architect William Strickland) was published in the June 1810 issue of The Port Folio. It is frequently misidentified as Finley's Jacob's Creek Bridge, but that bridge had a single 70-foot span. Strickland's elevation shows a multi-span bridge, and the caption below it reads "200 ft. span."

Artist Thomas Birch painted the bridge twice in 1811; one painting is at the Historical Society of Pennsylvania, the other is in a private collection.

A watercolor copy of HSP's Birch painting (by Russian artist Pavel Svinin) is in the collection of the Metropolitan Museum of Art.

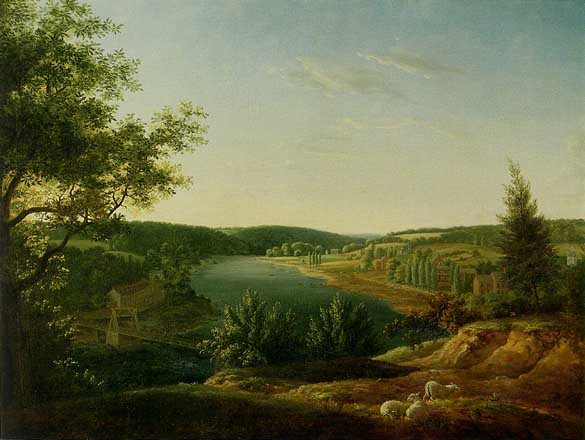
"View of Chain Bridge and Falls of Schuylkill, Five Miles from Philadelphia" (1811), by Thomas Birch (private collection).

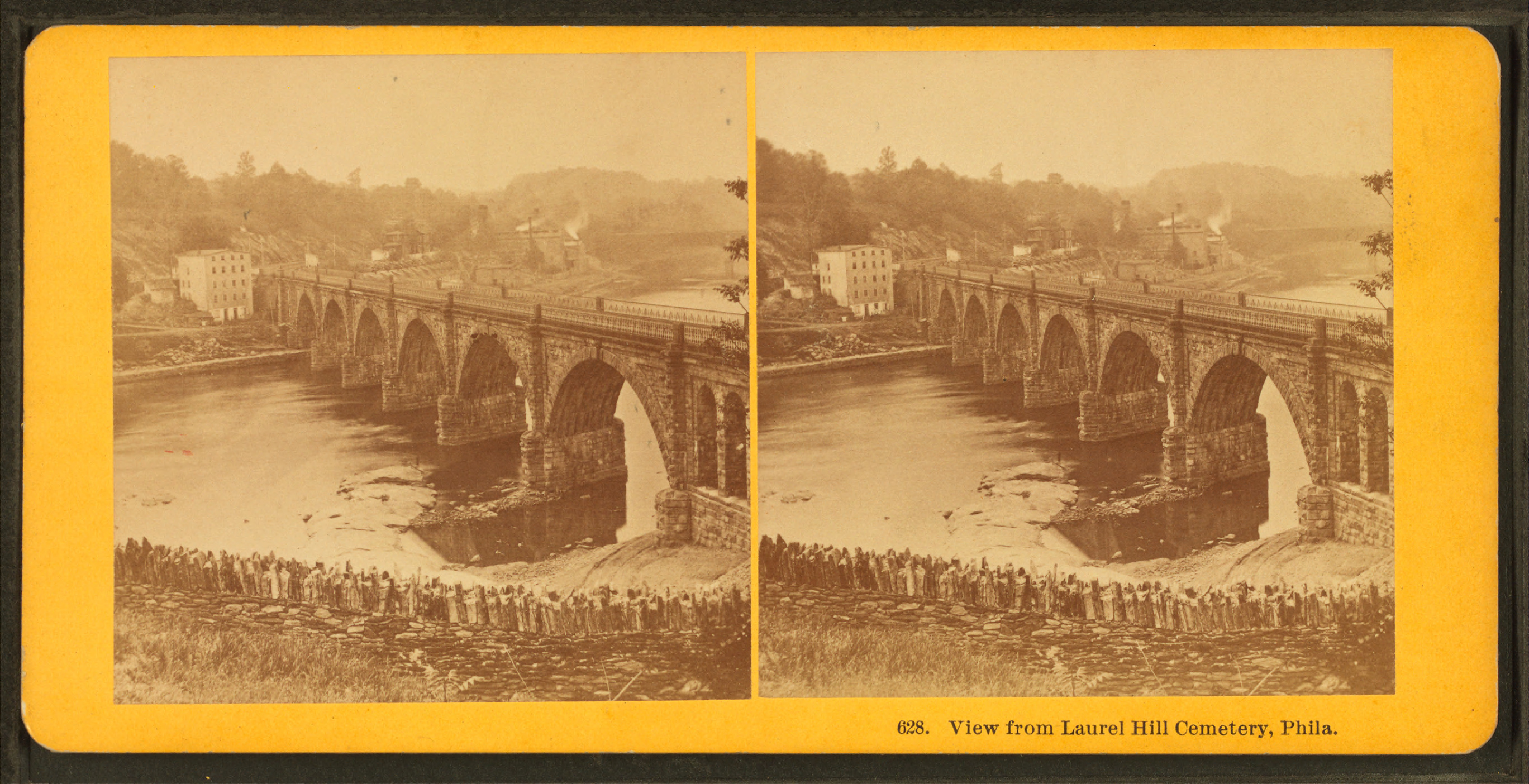
"View from Laurel Hill Cemetery, Phila." The Philadelphia & Reading Railroad Schuylkill River Viaduct (1853–56, still in use) was built at the approximate location of the Chain Bridge. This photograph was taken from almost the same spot as the Birch painting.

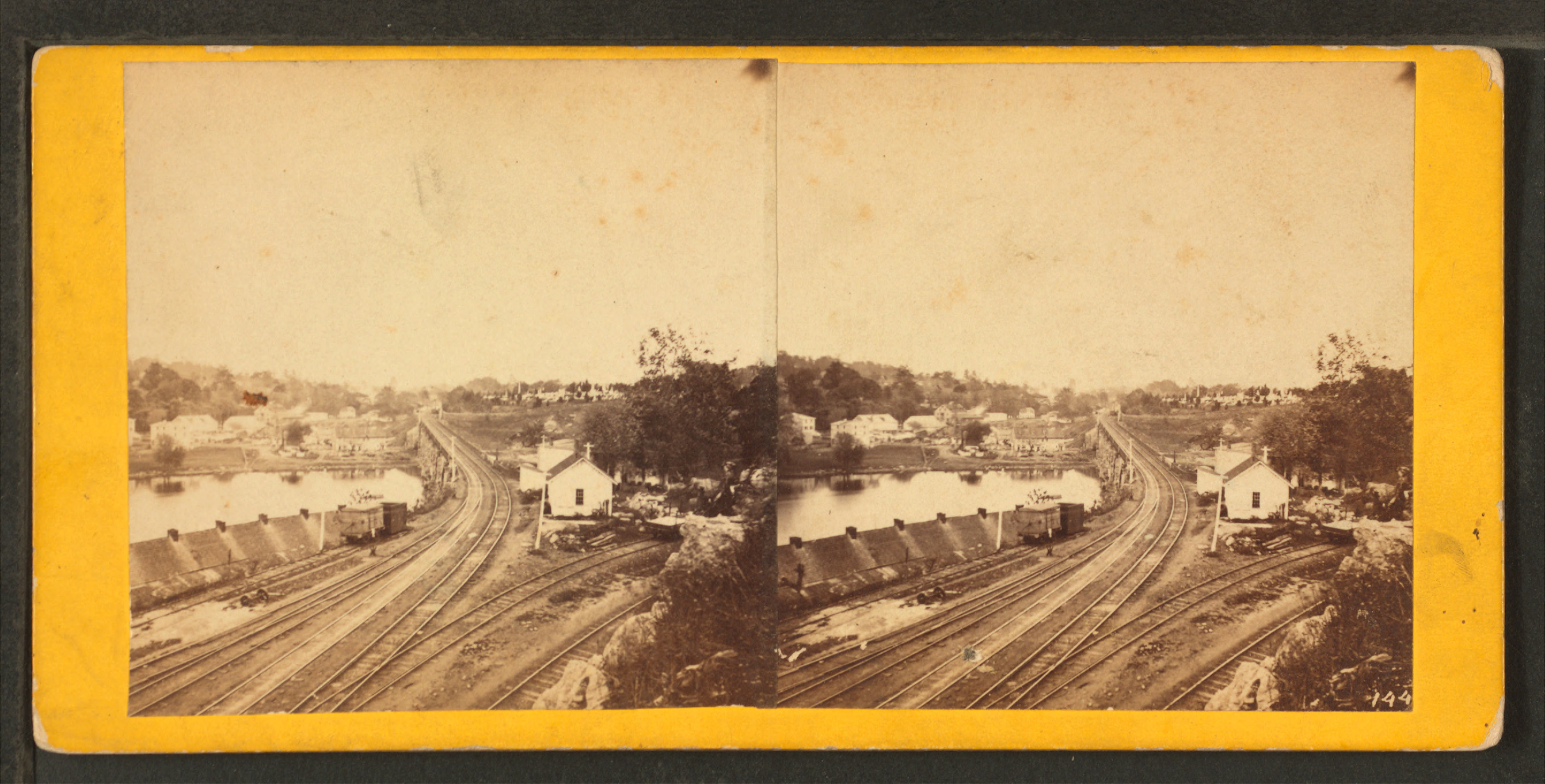
Falls of Schuylkill, from the western side of the river. Philadelphia and Reading Railway Bridge is at center. Laurel Hill Cemetery is visible at upper right.

== See also ==
- Spider Bridge at Falls of Schuylkill
- List of crossings of the Schuylkill River

== Sources ==
- The Port Folio, vol. 3, no. 6 (June 1810).
- Joseph Jackson, Encyclopedia of Philadelphia (Harrisburg: National Historical Association, Inc., 1931), vol. 2, pp. 411–12.
