= Jacob's Creek Bridge (Pennsylvania) =

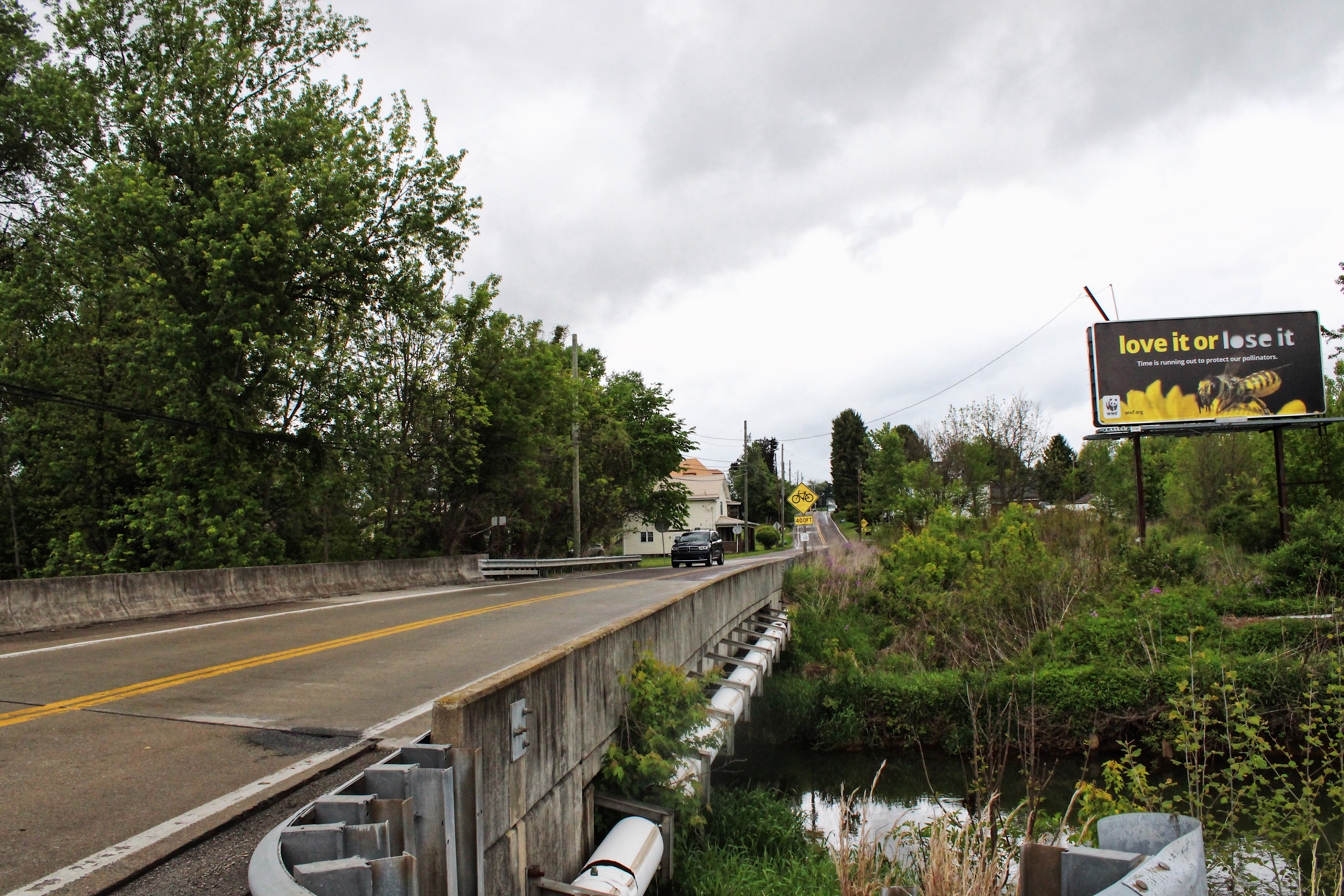
- The site of the former Jacob's Creek bridge as the area appears in 2026
- Coordinates: 40.11254°N 79.55309°W
- Crosses: Jacob's Creek
- Locale: South of Mount Pleasant, Pennsylvania

Characteristics
- Material: Wrought iron chain
- Total length: 70 feet (21 m)
- Width: 12 feet 6 inches (3.81 m)

History
- Designer: James Finley
- Construction cost: $600 (US$10,000 with inflation)
- Opened: 1801
- Closed: 1833

Location
- Interactive map of Jacob's Creek Bridge

Jacob's Creek Bridge (1801, demolished 1833) was the first iron-chain suspension bridge built in the United States. Designed by James Finley, a local judge and inventor, it spanned Jacob's Creek, just south of Mount Pleasant, Pennsylvania. Nothing of the bridge is thought to remain, but an area on the north side of Jacob's Creek – where Route 819 (Mount Pleasant Road) crosses – is still called "Iron Bridge."

== History ==
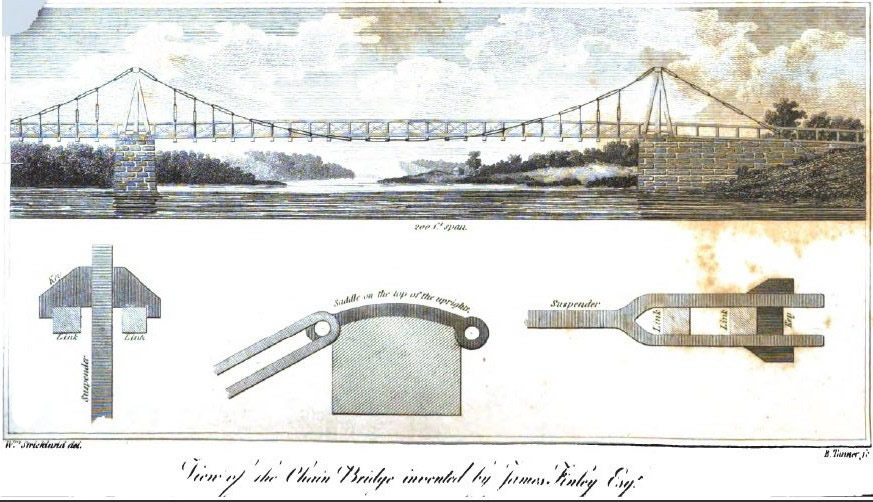
Chain Bridge at Falls of Schuylkill, Philadelphia, Pennsylvania (1808). Jacob's Creek Bridge was of similar design, but only a single span.

Iron-chain suspension bridges had been built in China, England, and elsewhere in Europe. During the 1790s Finley served as a state senator in Philadelphia (then the state capital), and frequented the American Philosophical Society library. Eda Kranakis, an expert on early American suspension bridges, conjectures that Finley would have had access in Philadelphia to information about European bridges.

Fayette County commissioners proposed the bridge in a March 1801 letter to the Westmoreland County board of commissioners. (Jacob's Creek forms part of the boundary between the counties.) The contract with Finley was signed in April, with each county committing to half of the $600 (US$14,000 in 2024 dollars) cost, and specifying that the bridge be completed by December 15. John Fulton and Andrew Oliphant constructed the bridge. Iron was supplied by Isaac Meason, Finley's friend and fellow judge, who owned nearby Union Furnace and Mount Vernon Furnace.

The bridge's two chain cables were made of 1-inch iron bar, wrought into links between 5 and 10 feet long, and anchored to the ground at each end. These stretched over 14-foot pyramid-shaped stone piers built on either side of the creek. Vertical suspenders dropped from the cables to support the wooden joists beneath the decking. Because the iron suspenders were graduated in length, the roadway was almost flat. Finley guaranteed the bridge to last for fifty years (except for the wooden decking). In a June 1810 article, Finley described the bridge as having a 70-foot (21 m) span, and a width of 12 feet 6 inches (3.81 m). He used a similar design for his Chain Bridge at Falls of Schuylkill in 1808, and secured a patent that same year.

Jacob's Creek Bridge was damaged in 1825 and rebuilt. It was replaced by a wooden bridge in 1833.
