= James Finley (engineer) =

American engineer

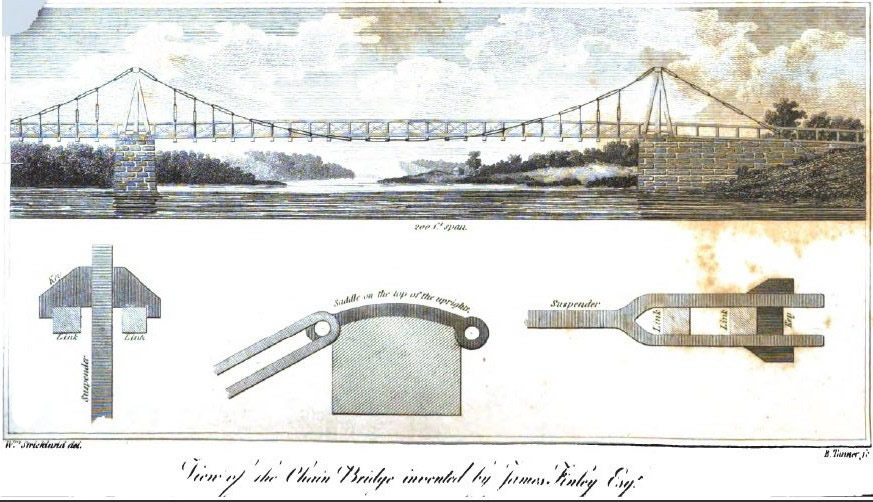
"View of the Chain Bridge invented by James Finley Esqr." (1810), wood engraving, William Strickland, delineator, The Port Folio [Magazine], June 1810. The 200-foot span shown in this image makes it almost certainly the Chain Bridge at Falls of Schuylkill.

James Finley (1756 – 1828), aka Judge James Finley, is widely recognized as the first designer and builder of the modern suspension bridge. Born in Ireland, Finley moved to a 287-acre (1.16 km^{2}) farm in Fayette County, Pennsylvania, near Uniontown. Elected a justice of the peace in 1784, he went on to become county commissioner in 1789, and a member of the Pennsylvania House of Representatives and Senate. From 1791 until his death, he was an Associate Judge for Fayette County.

His Jacob's Creek Bridge, built in 1801 for US$600 ($11,610 in 2025), and demolished in 1833, was the first example of a suspension bridge using wrought iron chains and with a level deck. It connected Uniontown to Greensburg, spanning 70 feet (21 metres), and was 12 feet 6 inches (3.81 m) wide.

Finley is also credited with designing and constructing a chain suspension bridge across Dunlap's Creek in Brownsville, Pennsylvania, in 1809. In 1820, however, the bridge collapsed under a heavy snow combined with the loads from a six-horse wagon team. The bridge was replaced by the Dunlap's Creek Bridge, the country's first cast-iron bridge, in 1835.

Other bridges built in accord with his patent include:

- Fort Juniata Crossing, sometime after 1801, on the road from Carlisle to Bedford. Demolished around 1818.
- Potomac River, 1807, 39 metre span
- Chain Bridge at Falls of Schuylkill, Philadelphia, 1808; 2 spans, eastern span 60.96 metre (200 ft), western span about 30.48 metre (100 ft); collapsed January 1816 under a heavy weight of snow.
- Old Chain Bridge, Newburyport, Massachusetts, over the Merrimack River, 1810, 74 metre (244 ft) span, replaced with a replica in 1910
- Lehigh River, Northampton, Pennsylvania, retained in service until 1933

Although he has been credited with designing as many as forty bridges, only twenty sites have been identified. None of Finley's bridges survive, the one in Newburyport has been replaced with a functioning replica.

Finley patented his system in 1808 and also published a paper on the principles of the deck-stiffened suspension bridge.
