= Union Station, Denver =

Neighborhood in Denver, Colorado

Coordinates: 39.7571°N 104.9971°W

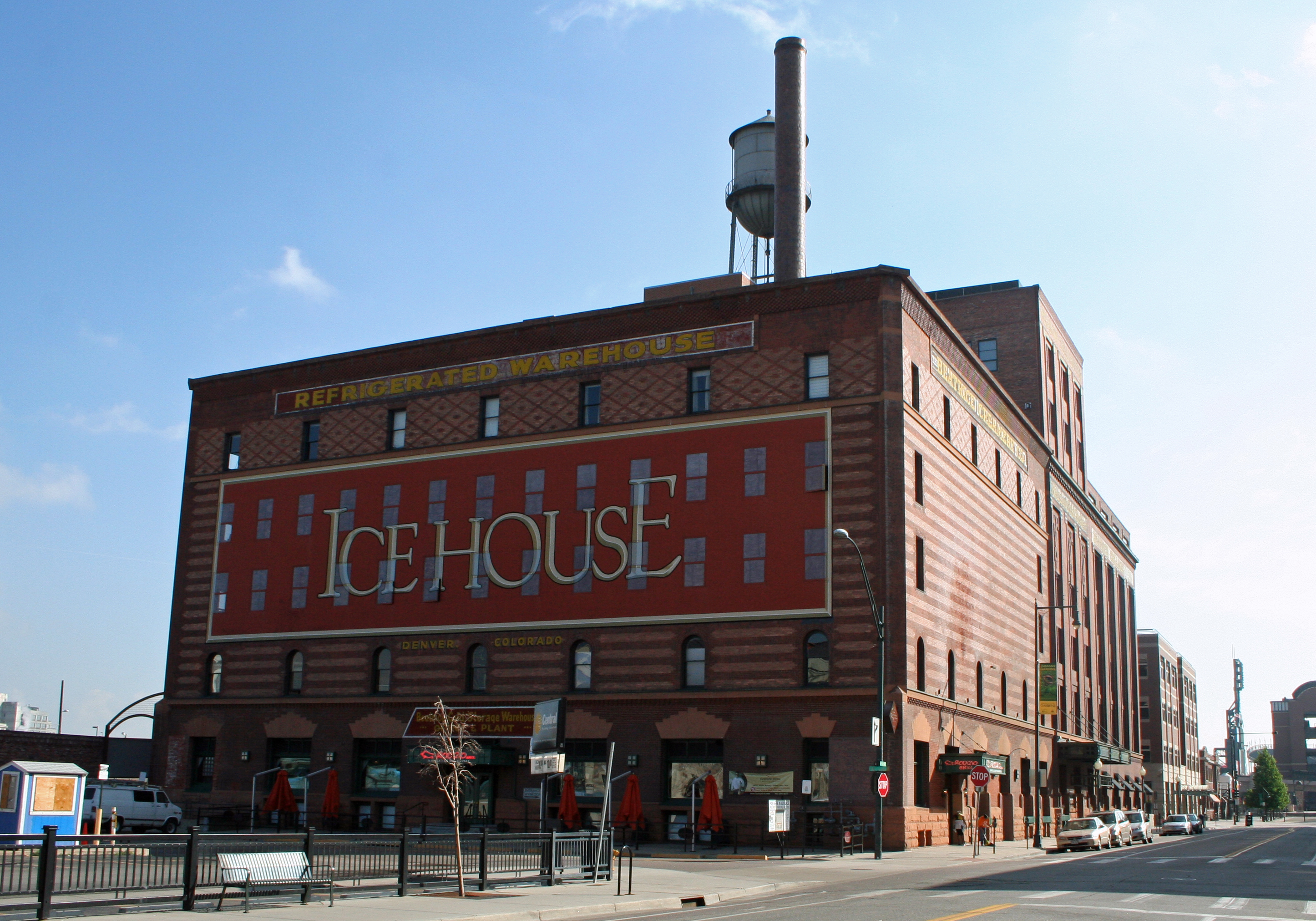
The Icehouse, a Union Station building listed on the National Register of Historic Places

Union Station is a downtown neighborhood of Denver, Colorado. In 2020, the population of the neighborhood was roughly 5,878.

The neighborhood is named for Union Station, Denver's main railroad terminal. Much of the Lower Downtown Historic District (known as LoDo) is in the Union Station neighborhood, but the boundaries of the two are not the same, and LoDo is not one of the city's official statistical neighborhoods.

== Boundaries ==
- Northwest: South Platte River
- Northeast: 20th Street
- Southeast: Lawrence Street
- Southwest: 14th Street (chiefly)

== Redevelopment ==
Union Station and 19.5 acres (79,000 m^{2}) of land surrounding it in the Union Station neighborhood were slated for re-development starting in 2002. As of 2019, that process has nearly been completed with the addition of a large number of apartments, a 334 unit condo complex, two grocery stores, and the now completed station.

== Landmarks ==
The 16th Street Mall ends in the Union Station neighborhood. It then continues in a northwesterly direction towards the Highland neighborhood as a pedestrian route. This route includes three pedestrian bridges: Highland Bridge, Denver Millennium Bridge, and the Platte River Bridge.

The neighborhood is anchored by Union Station.

== See also ==
- Bibliography of Colorado
- Geography of Colorado
- History of Colorado
- Index of Colorado-related articles
- List of Colorado-related lists
  - List of neighborhoods in Denver
  - List of populated places in Colorado
- Outline of Colorado
