= List of cable-stayed bridges in the United States =

This List of cable-stayed bridges in the United States includes notable cable-stayed bridges, both existing and destroyed, in the United States of America, organized by name.

== A ==
- Abraham Lincoln Bridge
- Arthur J. DiTommaso Memorial Bridge
- Arthur Ravenel Jr. Bridge

== B ==
- Barton Creek Bridge
- Bayview Bridge
- Benton City – Kiona Bridge
- Bill Emerson Memorial Bridge
- Bluff Dale Suspension Bridge
- Bob Kerrey Pedestrian Bridge

== C ==
- Cable Bridge
- Christopher S. Bond Bridge (Kansas City, Missouri)
- Clark Bridge
- Cochrane–Africatown USA Bridge

== D ==
- Dames Point Bridge
- Davenport Skybridge
- Denver Millennium Bridge
- Don Burnett Bicycle-Pedestrian Bridge

== E ==
- East 21st Street Bridge
- East Huntington Bridge

== F ==
- Fred Hartman Bridge

== G ==
- Goethals Bridge
- Gordie Howe International Bridge
- Great River Bridge
- Greenville Bridge

== H ==
- Hale Boggs Memorial Bridge
- Harbor Drive Pedestrian Bridge
- William H. Harsha Bridge

== I ==
- Indian River Inlet Bridge
- Ironton–Russell Bridge

== J ==
- Jesús Izcoa Moure Bridge
- John James Audubon Bridge (Mississippi River)
- John O'Connell Bridge

== K ==
- Kosciuszko Bridge

== L ==
- Lane Avenue Bridge
- Leonard P. Zakim Bunker Hill Memorial Bridge
- Lewis and Clark Bridge (Ohio River)
- Long Beach International Gateway

== M ==
- Margaret Hunt Hill Bridge
- Margaret McDermott Bridge
- Martin Olav Sabo Bridge

== N ==
- William H. Natcher Bridge
- Niagara Clifton Bridge
- North Avenue Bridge

== P ==
- Penobscot Narrows Bridge and Observatory
- Platte River Bridge
- Pomeroy–Mason Bridge

== R ==
- Rainbow Bridge (Texas)
- Reiman Bridge
- Senator William V. Roth Jr. Bridge

== S ==
- Sidney Lanier Bridge
- Stan Musial Veterans Memorial Bridge
- Sundial Bridge at Turtle Bay
- Sunshine Skyway Bridge

== T ==
- Talmadge Memorial Bridge
- Tappan Zee Bridge (2017–present)
- Tilikum Crossing

== U ==
- U.S. Grant Bridge

== V ==
- Varina-Enon Bridge
- Veterans Memorial Bridge (Steubenville, Ohio)
- Veterans' Glass City Skyway

== Z ==
- Leonard P. Zakim Bunker Hill Memorial Bridge

== See also ==
- List of longest cable-stayed bridge spans
- Floating cable-stayed bridge
