= Cable-stayed suspension bridge =

Type of bridge

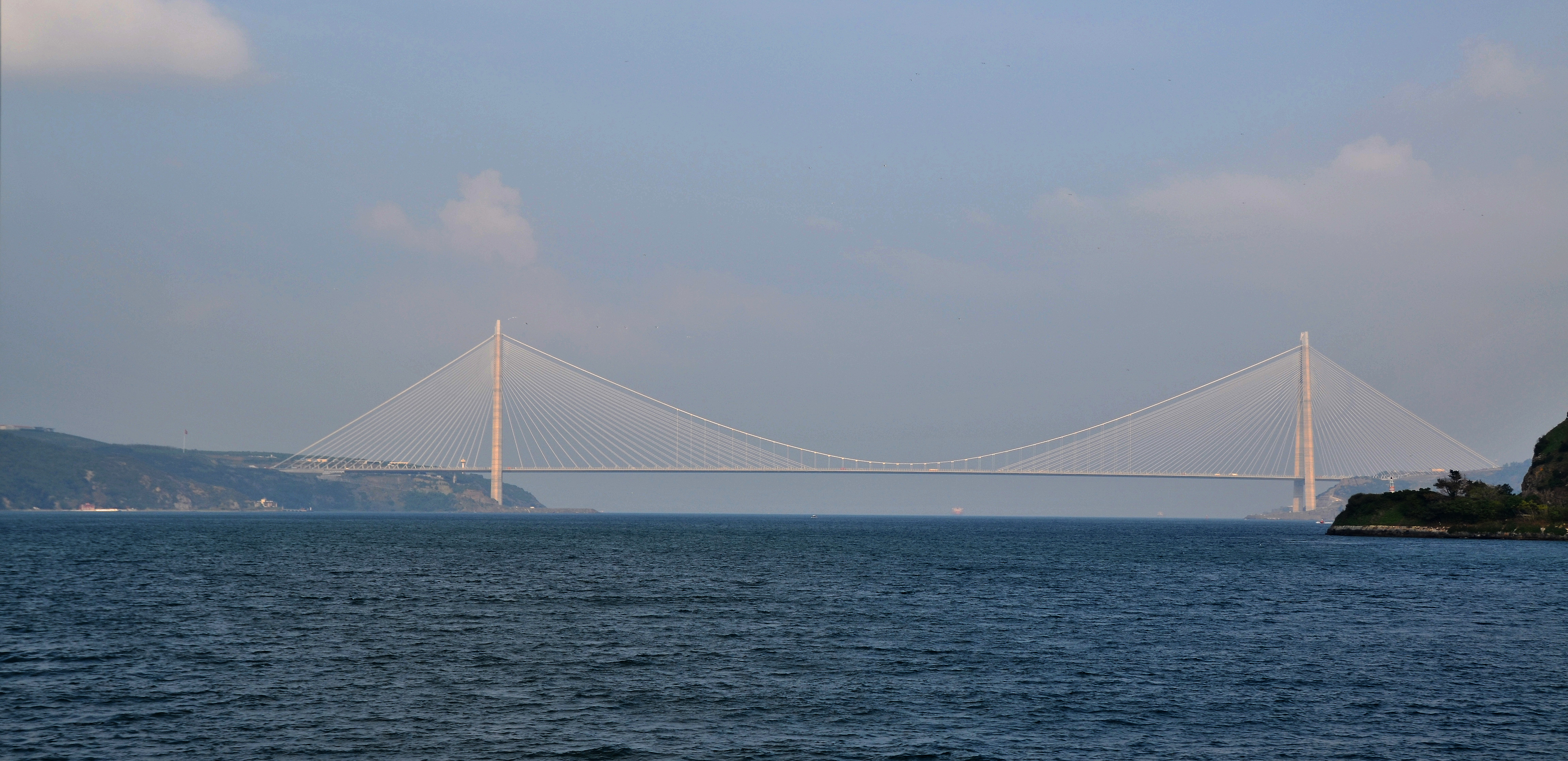
- Span range: Long
- Movable: No

Cable-stayed suspension bridge
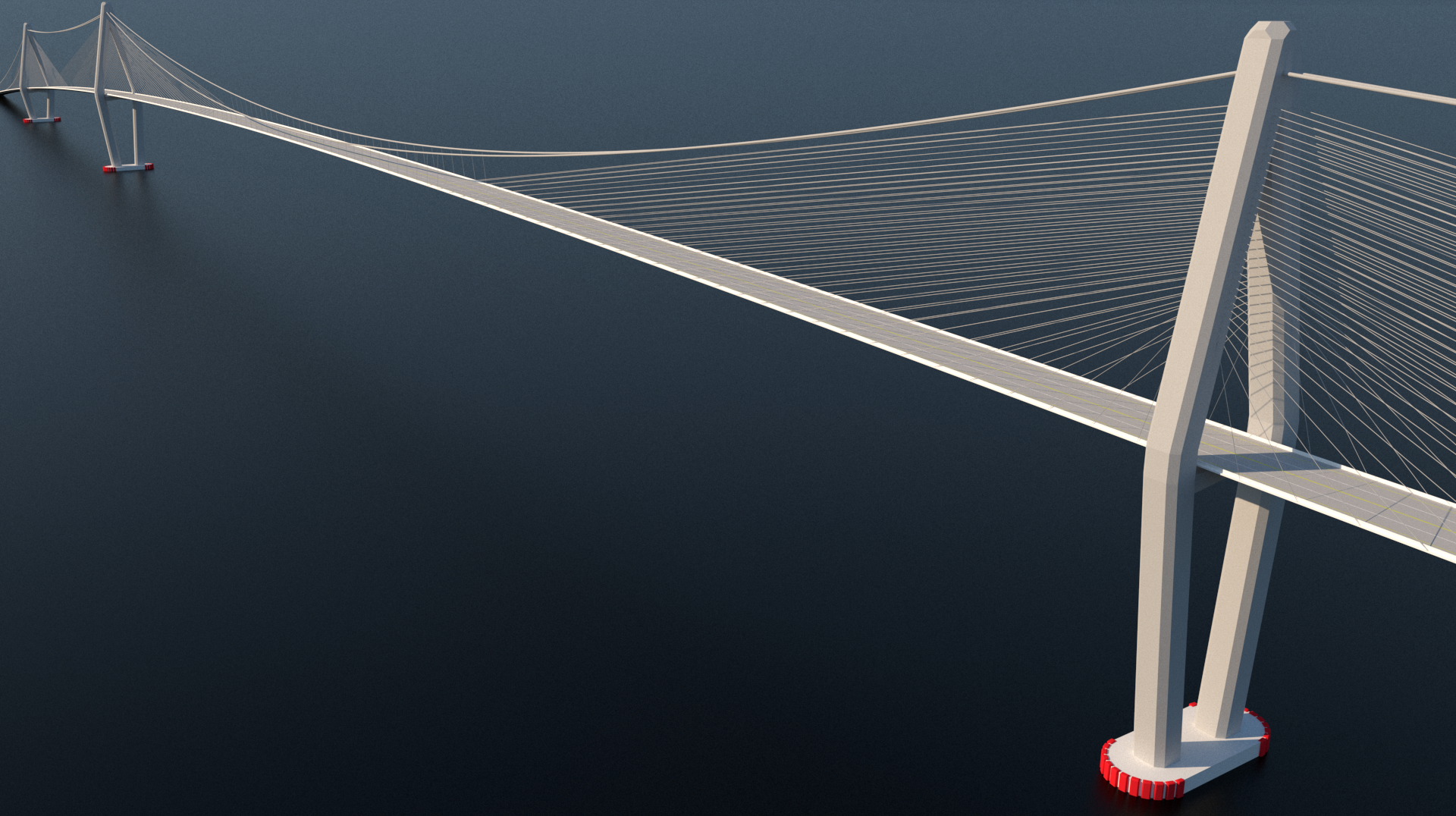
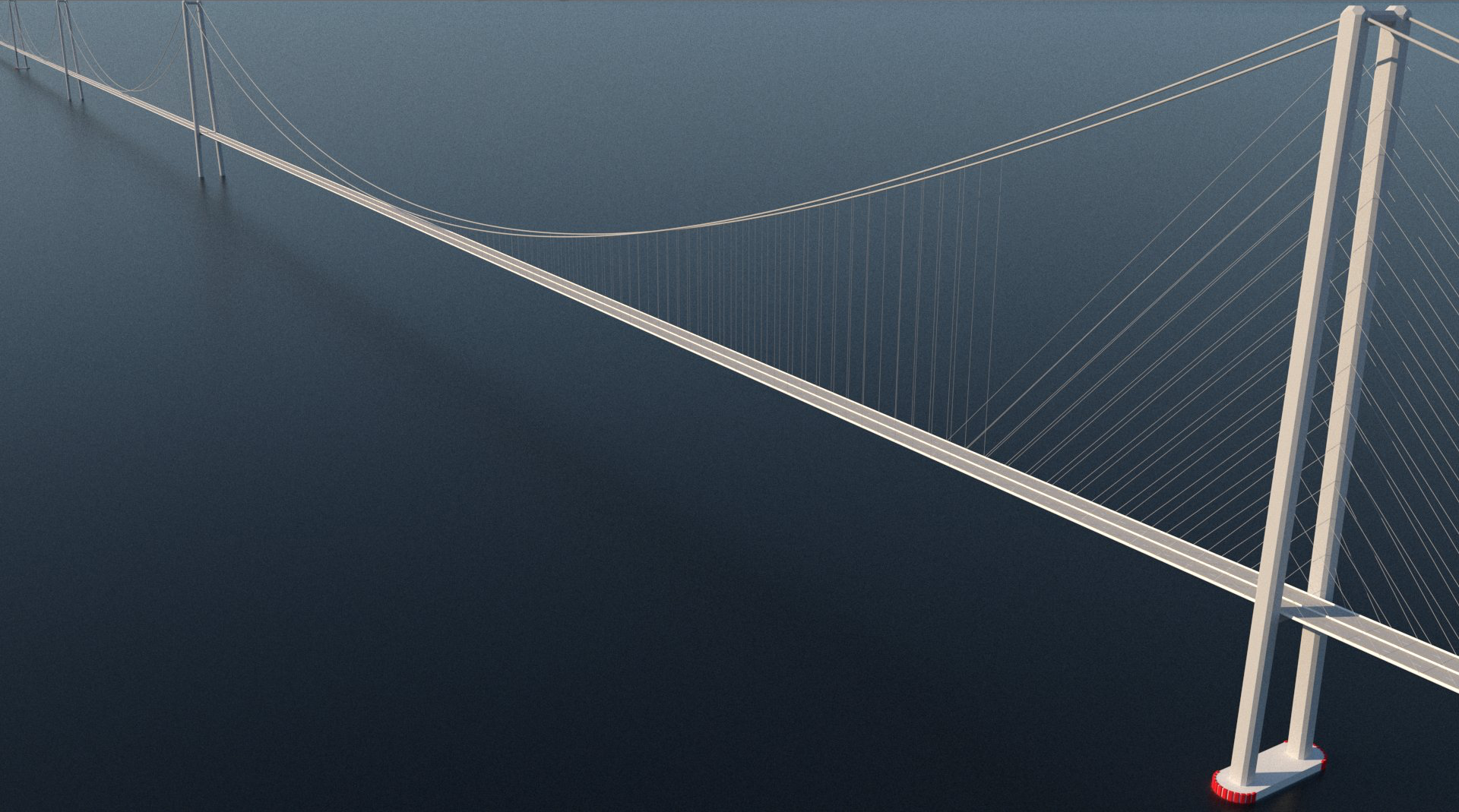
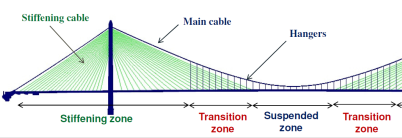
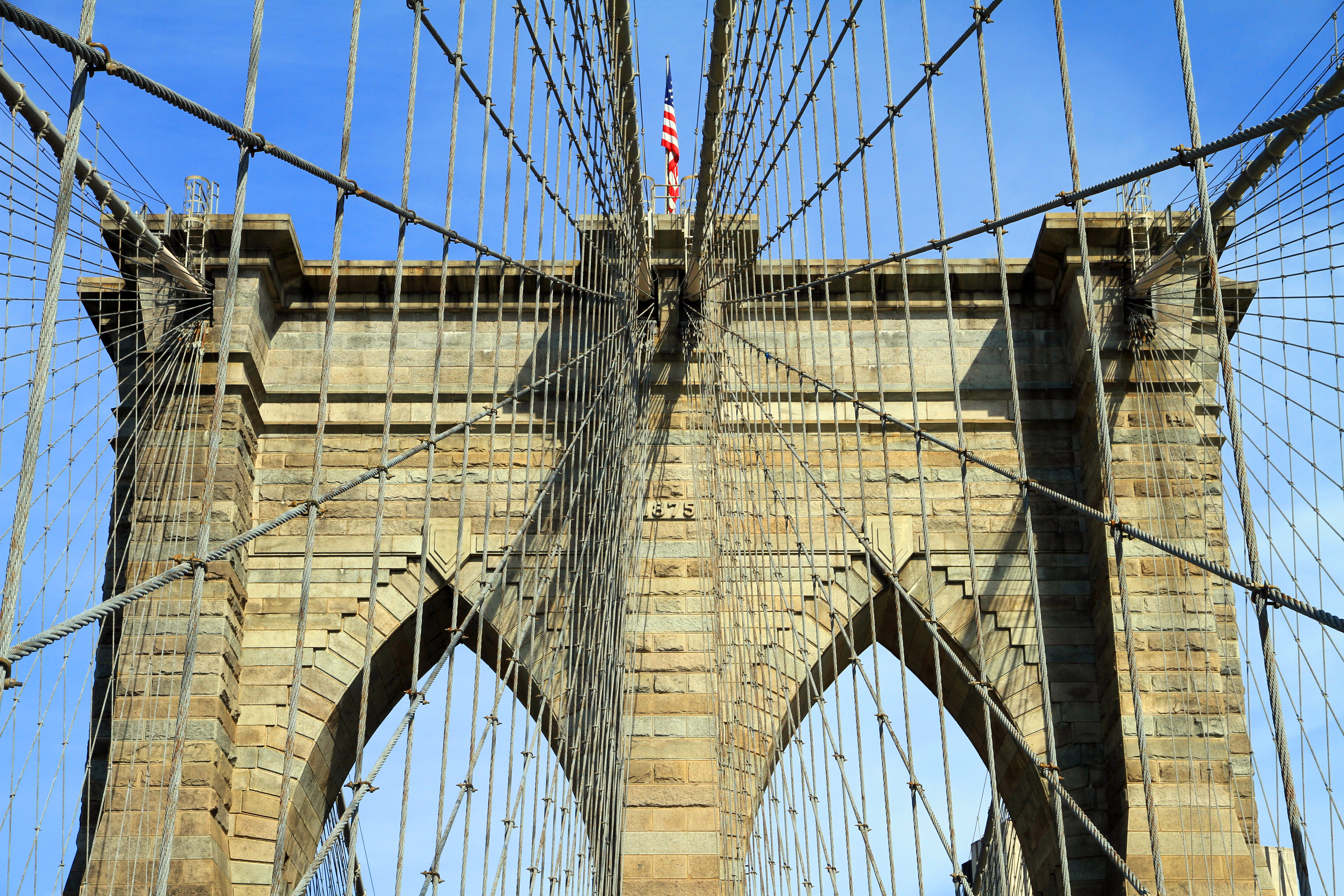

A cable-stayed suspension bridge or CSS bridge merges the designs of cable-stayed bridges and suspension bridges. The suspension bridge's architecture is better at handling the load in the middle of the bridge, while the cable stayed bridge is better suited to handle the load closest to the tower. Combining these two architectural engineering ideas into a hybrid has been done in Istanbul with the Yavuz Sultan Selim Bridge, and in New York City with the Brooklyn Bridge. A bridge over the Krishna River in India has been approved in October 2022 that will be a CSS bridge design.

== Yavuz Sultan Selim Bridge ==
In Turkey the Yavuz Sultan Selim Bridge over the Bosporus Strait opened in August 2016. The main span is 1,408 m (4,619 ft) long and is the 15th-longest bridge span in the world.

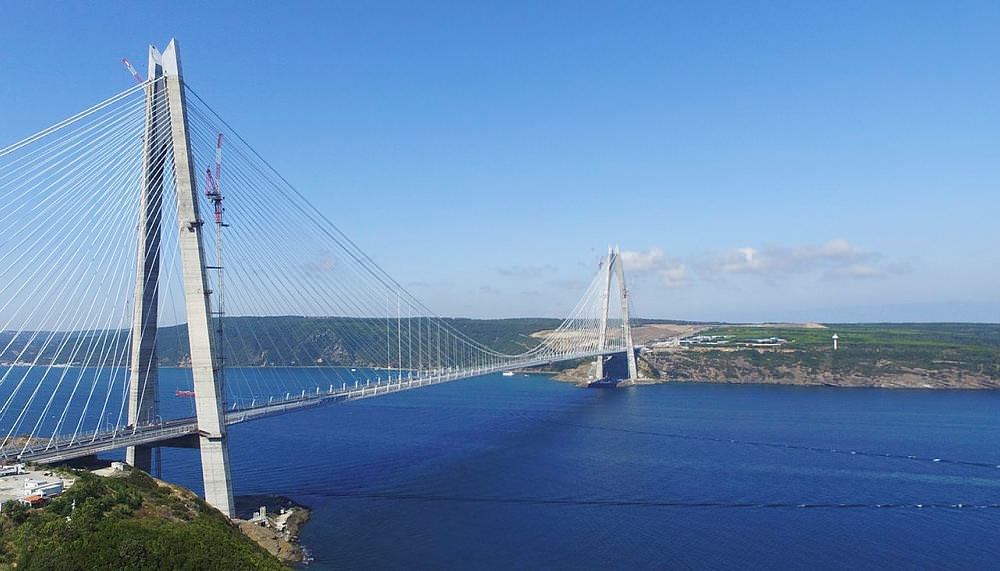
Yavuz Sultan Selim Bridge in Istanbul

== See also ==
- List of longest cable-stayed bridge spans
- List of longest suspension bridge spans
- List of cable-stayed bridges in the United States
- List of bridge types
- Floating cable-stayed bridge
- Floating suspension bridge
- Self-anchored suspension bridge
