= Ian Firth =

British engineer and bridge designer

Ian Firth FREng FICE FIStructE Hon FRIBA
- Born: 17 February 1956 (age 70); England
- Education: The Pilgrims' School, Marlborough College, University of Bristol, Imperial College London
- Engineering career
- Discipline: Structural Engineer, Civil Engineer
- Institutions: Institution of Structural Engineers; Institution of Civil Engineers; Royal Academy of Engineering; Royal Institute of British Architects
- Practice name: Ian Firth
- Projects: Stonecutters Bridge Hong Kong, Strait of Messina Bridge Italy, Strengthening West Gate Bridge Melbourne, Pont Schuman Lyon France, University Swing Bridge Malmö Sweden, Ting Kau Bridge Hong Kong
- Significant design: Bridge of Aspiration Covent Garden, Sail Bridge Swansea, Third Way Bridge Taunton, Lockmeadow Bridge Maidstone, Inner Harbour Bridge Inderhavnsbroen Copenhagen,

Ian Firth is a British structural engineer and bridge designer.

== Early life and education ==
Born in Sussex into a Royal Navy family, Firth was a chorister at Winchester Cathedral before going to Marlborough College and then to the University of Bristol where he secured a First Class Honours degree in Civil Engineering in 1979.

== Career ==
Firth joined specialist consulting engineers Flint & Neill in London upon graduation, and initially worked on a variety of projects including tall radio masts and towers, chimneys and steel buildings, as well as the aerodynamic stability of box girder bridges. He then attended Imperial College and obtained a further degree in Structural steel Design in 1982. Returning to Flint & Neill, he worked on the complex strengthening and upgrading of the Wye Bridge, a steel box girder cable-stayed bridge and part of the M48 Severn crossing. Since then he has directed several other similar projects involving strengthening of such structures, including the Erskine Bridge in Scotland and the West Gate Bridge in Australia. His other work on major long span bridges includes the independent design checks and investigations for the Tsing Ma Bridge, Kap Shui Mun Bridge and Ting Kau Bridge, all in Hong Kong. He was appointed as special advisor to the client for the longest span of them all, the Strait of Messina Bridge in Italy, which when built will have a main span of 3,300m.

Firth led the team which won the Poole Harbour Crossing bridge design competition in 1997, working with Danish architects Dissing+Weitling, and has subsequently won many other bridge design competitions. These include Lockmeadow Bridge in Maidstone, the Bridge of Aspiration for the Royal Ballet School in London, the River Oise bridge in Compiègne, France, the Pont Schuman in Lyon, France, and Inderhavnsbroen in Copenhagen.

He became partner in Flint & Neill in 1990, and when the firm joined COWI in 2008 he was appointed a director. He retired from full-time employment in 2018 and now works as a consultant, continuing to provide bridge design and engineering advice, training and education.

Firth was president of the Institution of Structural Engineers in 2017 and is chairman of the British Group of the International Association for Bridge and Structural Engineering. He is also a trustee of bridge building charity Bridges to Prosperity.

== Awards and honours ==
Firth is an Honorary Fellow of the Royal Institute of British Architects. He was awarded the Prix Albert Caquot in 2019.

== Selected projects ==
- Lockmeadow Bridge, 1999
- Halgavor Bridge, 2001
- Swansea Sail Bridge, 2003
- River Oise Bridge, Compiègne, 2011
- Third Way Bridge, 2011
- Inderhavnsbroen Copenhagen, 2009 – 2016

== See also ==
- Messina Bridge
- Floating suspension bridge
