= Floating cable-stayed bridge =

Type of cable-stayed bridge

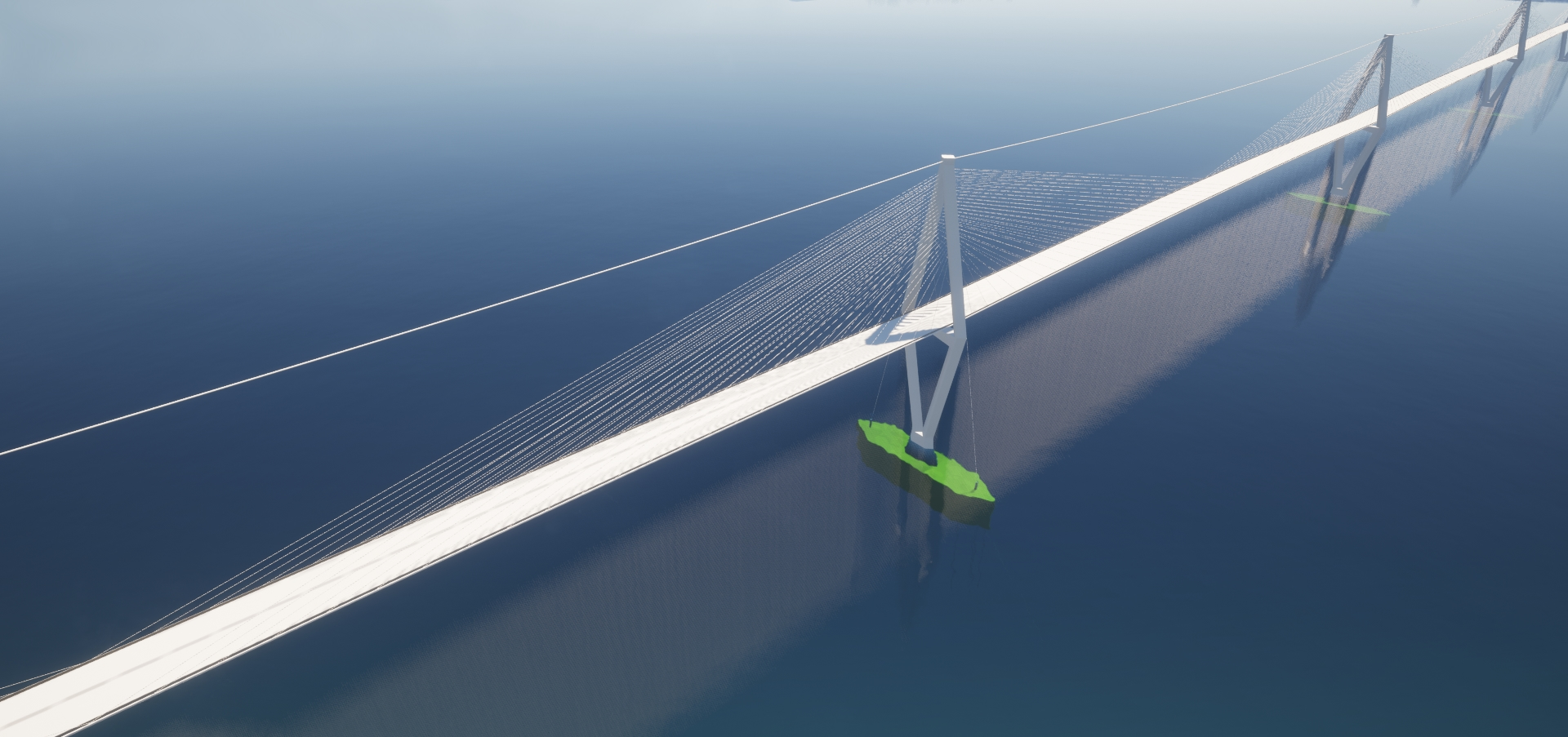
- Span range: Long
- Movable: No

A floating cable-stayed bridge is a type of cable-stayed bridge where the towers float on tension-leg submerged material, tethered to the seabed for buoyancy. No floating cable-stayed bridge has been made or planned as of 2025, but a floating suspension bridge was planned in Norway before being turned into a floating pontoon bridge and conventional cable-stayed bridge. A floating cable-stayed bridge could be more stable horizontally across the bridge deck than floating suspension bridges. The lateral forces from the wind and water pose a problem, which could be solved by placing tethered cables at different angles from the floating platform to the seabed.

== See also ==
- Cable-stayed suspension bridge
- Floating suspension bridge
- List of cable-stayed bridges in the United States
- List of longest cable-stayed bridge spans
- List of longest suspension bridge spans
- List of straits
