= Floating suspension bridge =

Type of bridge

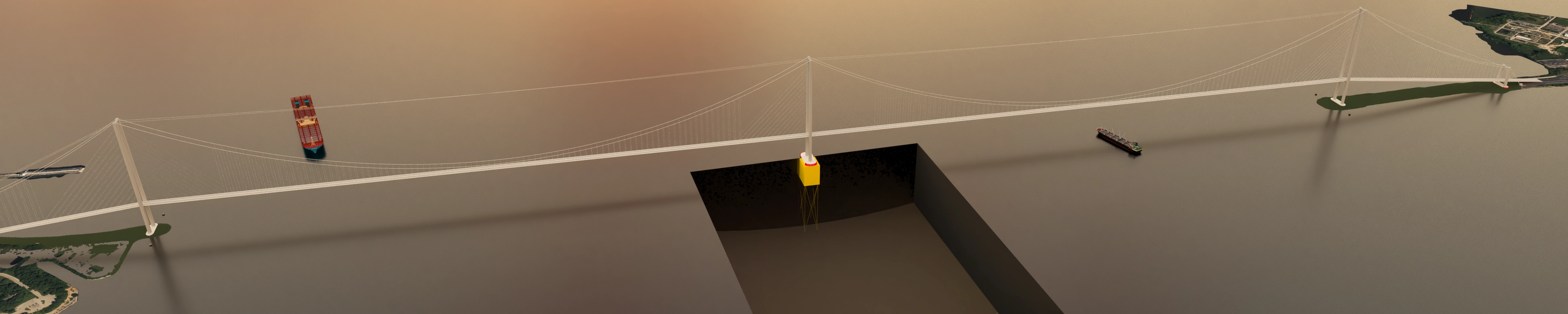
- Floating cable-stayed suspension bridge
- Ancestor: Suspension bridge
- Related: Suspension bridge; Underspanned suspension bridge; see also cable-stayed bridge
- Carries: Pedestrians, bicycles, livestock, automobiles, trucks, light rail
- Span range: long
- Movable: No

A floating suspension bridge is a type of suspension bridge supported by towers built on floating pontoons which are tethered to the seabed. The design is intended to overcome the difficulties of building suspension towers in locations where the water is particularly deep. As of 2025 no such bridges have been built, but planning was done to build one in Norway, at Bjørnafjord, designed by engineer Ian Firth. The bridge was later turned into a floating pontoon bridge with a conventional cable-stayed bridge secured to bedrock.

== See also ==
- Floating cable-stayed bridge
- Cable-stayed suspension bridge
- Intercontinental and transoceanic fixed links
- Strait of Gibraltar
- Straits of Tiran
