= Honeymoon Bridge (Niagara Falls) =

Former bridge over Niagara River, collapsed in 1938

Upper Steel Arch Bridge Honeymoon Bridge Fallsview Bridge
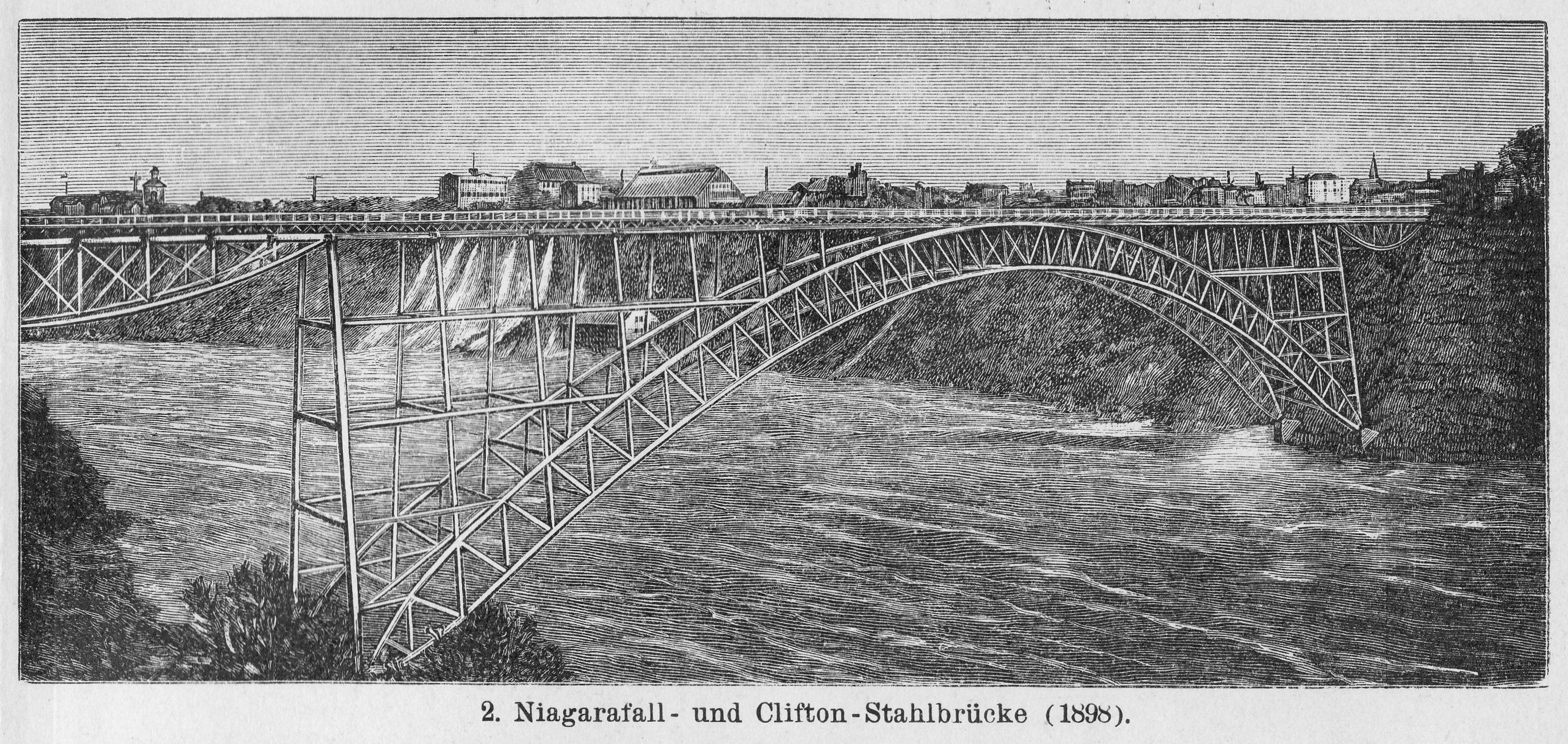
- The Upper Steel Arch Bridge at Niagara Falls
- Coordinates: 43°5′13.2″N 79°4′15.6″W
- Crossed: Niagara River
- Preceded by: Niagara Clifton Bridge
- Followed by: Rainbow Bridge

Characteristics
- Design: Steel Arch Bridge
- Total length: 1,240 ft (378 m)
- Longest span: 840 ft (256 m)

History
- Construction end: 1897
- Opened: 1898
- Collapsed: January 27, 1938

Location
- Interactive map of Upper Steel Arch Bridge; Honeymoon Bridge; Fallsview Bridge

The Upper Steel Arch Bridge, also known as the Honeymoon Bridge or Fallsview Bridge (less frequently Falls View Bridge), was an international bridge which crossed the Niagara River, connecting Niagara Falls, Ontario, Canada, with Niagara Falls, New York, United States. It was located about 500 feet (150 m) upriver of the present-day Rainbow Bridge. It collapsed on January 27, 1938 after suffering damage from a 100-foot (30 m) ice floe.

== History ==
Built in 1897–98 by the Pencoyd Bridge Company, the Upper Steel Arch Bridge was located 14 ft (4.3 m) closer to the American Falls than the bridge that it replaced. When completed, the bridge became the largest steel arch bridge in the world. Its features included a double track for trolley cars and room for carriages and pedestrians. The bridge had to be constantly protected from ice bridges that formed over the river every winter. In January 1899 a huge ice bridge threatened the bridge when ice piled around its abutments due to their close proximity to the river's surface. The bridge was subsequently fortified with a 24-foot (7.3 m) tall stone wall around the abutments.

=== Collapse (January 1938) ===
An ice floe coming from Lake Erie created by a powerful wind storm going over Niagara Falls caused issues with the stability of the Honeymoon Bridge and the Ontario Hydro-Electric Power Commission power plant on January 26, 1938. The ice caused the water level to reach 40 feet (12 m) above sea level, passing a previous record of 25 feet (7.6 m) in 1909. While the workers at the plant safely evacuated to higher ground, the ice resulted in closure of the Honeymoon Bridge at 9 a.m. on January 26. With the ice affecting the New York-side abutment, onlookers watched as the upper levels of the bridge shifted towards the falls due to the girders supporting the arch suffering catastrophic damage. Walter McCausland of the International Railway Company (IRC) denied that the bridge had been damaged, but added that they would begin using dynamite to destroy the packed ice damaging the bridge. McCausland added that by 12 p.m., the bridge had not moved further. A photographer on the New York side stated that the bridge moved as much as 7 inches (18 cm). United States Border Patrol workers evacuated the area and all ferry service along the Niagara River was suspended.

By the morning of January 27, a change in the wind direction stopped the continued growth of ice on the abutments of the structure. During the morning they found that the Maid of the Mist steamboats were knocked off their drydock and kicked into the ice, suffering some damage from the wall of the river gorge. Onlookers continued to stare at the damaged bridge while engineers kept inspecting the structure. They noted that no movement had been recorded since 12 p.m. on January 26. Workers had worked overnight to build new reinforcements to keep the bridge from moving any further. Local engineers declared victory against the attack and McCausland felt that the bridge would survive. McCausland added that the new wooden cribs and reinforcements that engineered installed had begun to remove the pressure on the abutment. He added that the bridge suffered extensive damage but would be repairable.

In the afternoon of January 27, workmen and engineers from the IRC were called off the bridge due to further movement. An inspection by engineers that afternoon found that the bridge was beyond repair. McCausland called his staff off the bridge, stating that they were to give up the battle. The workmen reached land before steel on the bridge began moving once again and the arch began to loosen. Sharp noises were heard of by the engineers as rivets began to snap as workers began to flee. The middle of the arch buckled and collapsed with a loud roar into the river. A white cloud of snow also engulfed the area as the bridge collapsed into the river. The bridge broke in four separate sections and landed vertically on the ice, with some of the bridge buried under the ice. There was immediate concern that some of the workers had not escaped the collapsed bridge, but all staff were accounted for. McCausland added than an investigation would be launched to determine what happened to the bridge and that no plans were immediate for the replacement.

== Gallery ==
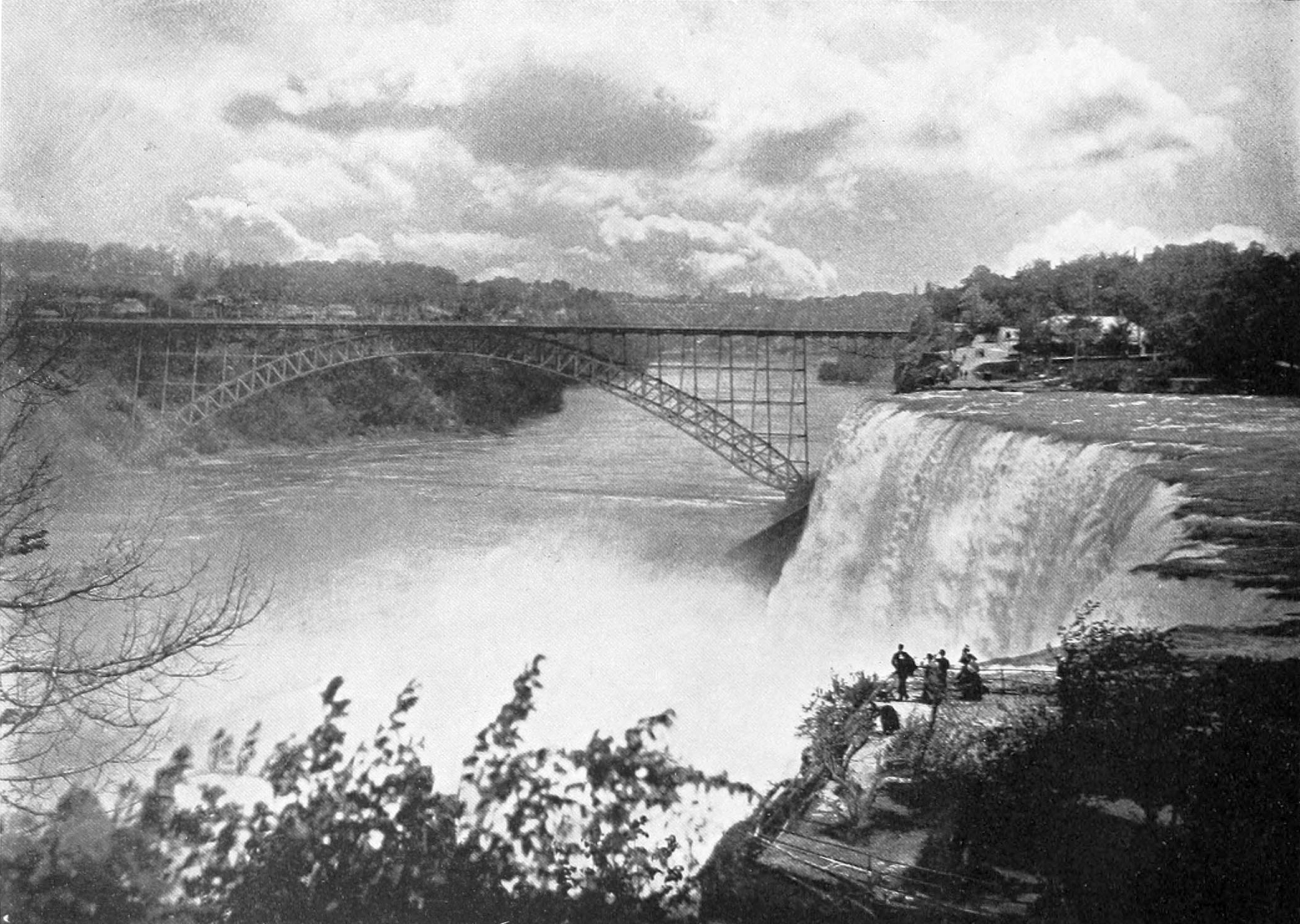
Upper Steel Arch Bridge from Goat Island, 1900

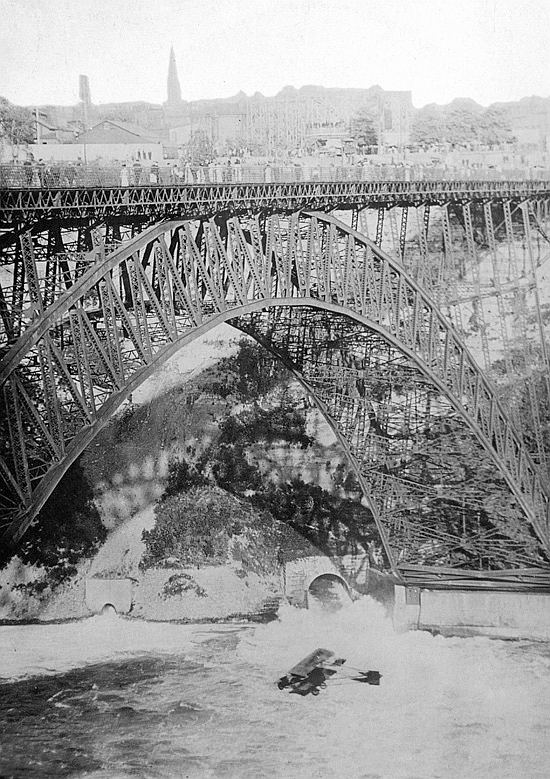
Lincoln Beachey's Curtiss Model D flies under Honeymoon Bridge, circa 1911

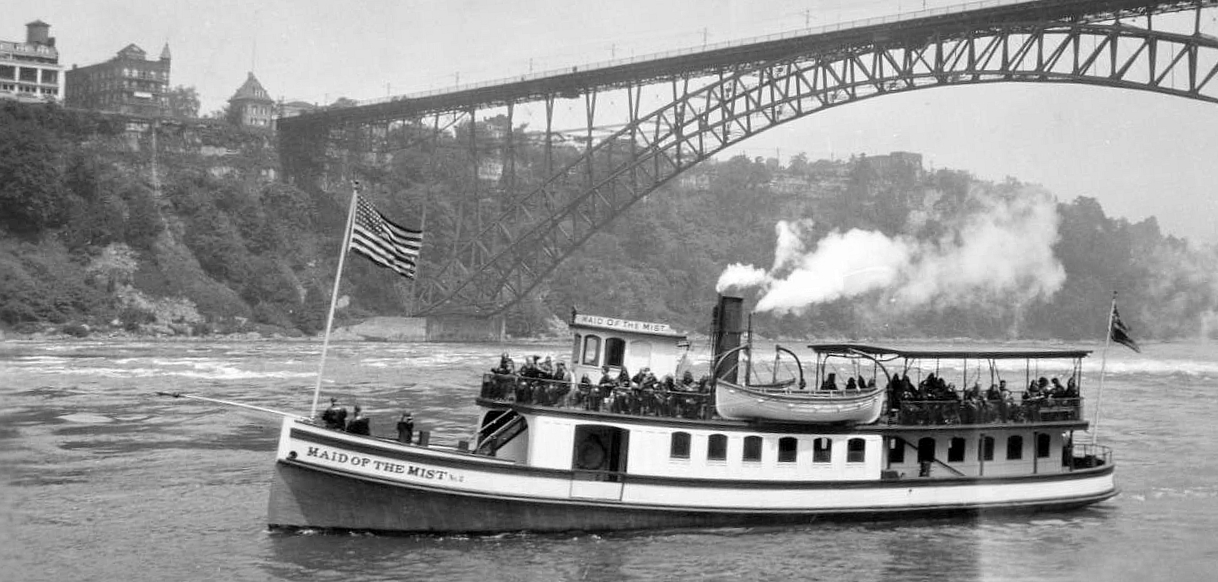
Maid of the Mist beneath Honeymoon Bridge, circa 1920

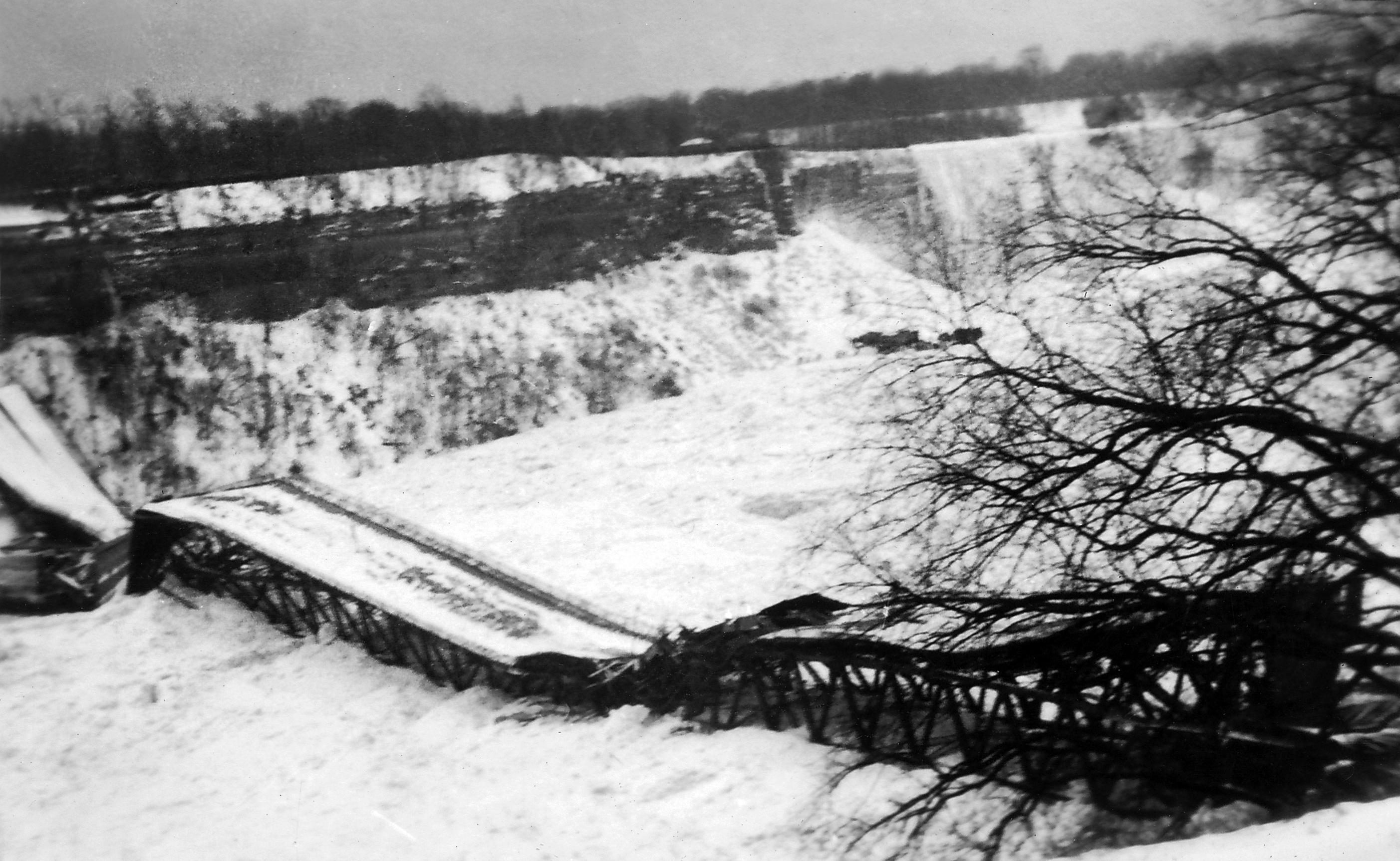
Collapsed bridge on ice jam in Niagara River (view from Canadian side)

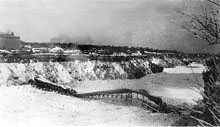
Collapsed bridge (view from U.S. side)

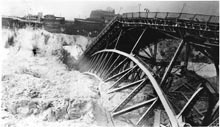
Closer view of collapse

== See also ==
- List of international bridges in North America
