= LoDo, Denver =

Unofficial neighborhood in Denver, Colorado

Coordinates: 39.7536°N 105.0004°W

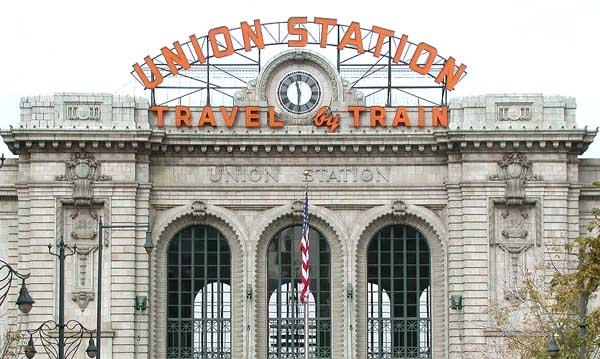
Union Station in LoDo

LoDo (Lower Downtown) is an unofficial neighborhood in Denver, Colorado, and is one of the oldest places of settlement in the city. It is a mixed-use historic district, known for its nightlife, and serves as an example of success in urban reinvestment and revitalization. The current population is approximately 21,145.

== History ==
Prior to European exploration of the area, Native Americans, particularly the Arapaho tribe, established encampments along the South Platte River near or in what is now LoDo. In 1858, after the discovery of gold in the river, General William Larimer founded Denver by putting down cottonwood logs in the center of a square mile plot that would eventually be the current LoDo neighborhood, making LoDo both the original city of Denver, as well as its oldest neighborhood. Then, like now, LoDo was a bustling and sometimes wild area known for its saloons and brothels. During the Sand Creek Massacre, it was in LoDo that the heads of the slaughtered Arapaho tribe were paraded in victory.

As Denver grew, city leaders realized a railroad was needed to keep Denver a strong city, especially when the transcontinental railroad bypassed Denver for Cheyenne, Wyoming. In 1870, after much cajoling from town leaders, residents passed bonds that brought a 106-mile (171 km) rail spur from Cheyenne. This and later train lines ended up in the Central Platte Valley, adjacent to LoDo. Union Station became the place by which most people traveled into the city and LoDo would be the first part of the city they would see. This section eventually became Denver's Chinatown from the 1870s to the 1880s, only to be torn down by race riots.

By the mid-twentieth century, what was once a thriving business area had become a skid row. As highways and airports diminished the dominance of passenger railroad transportation, the importance of Union Station, LoDo's most prominent building, waned.

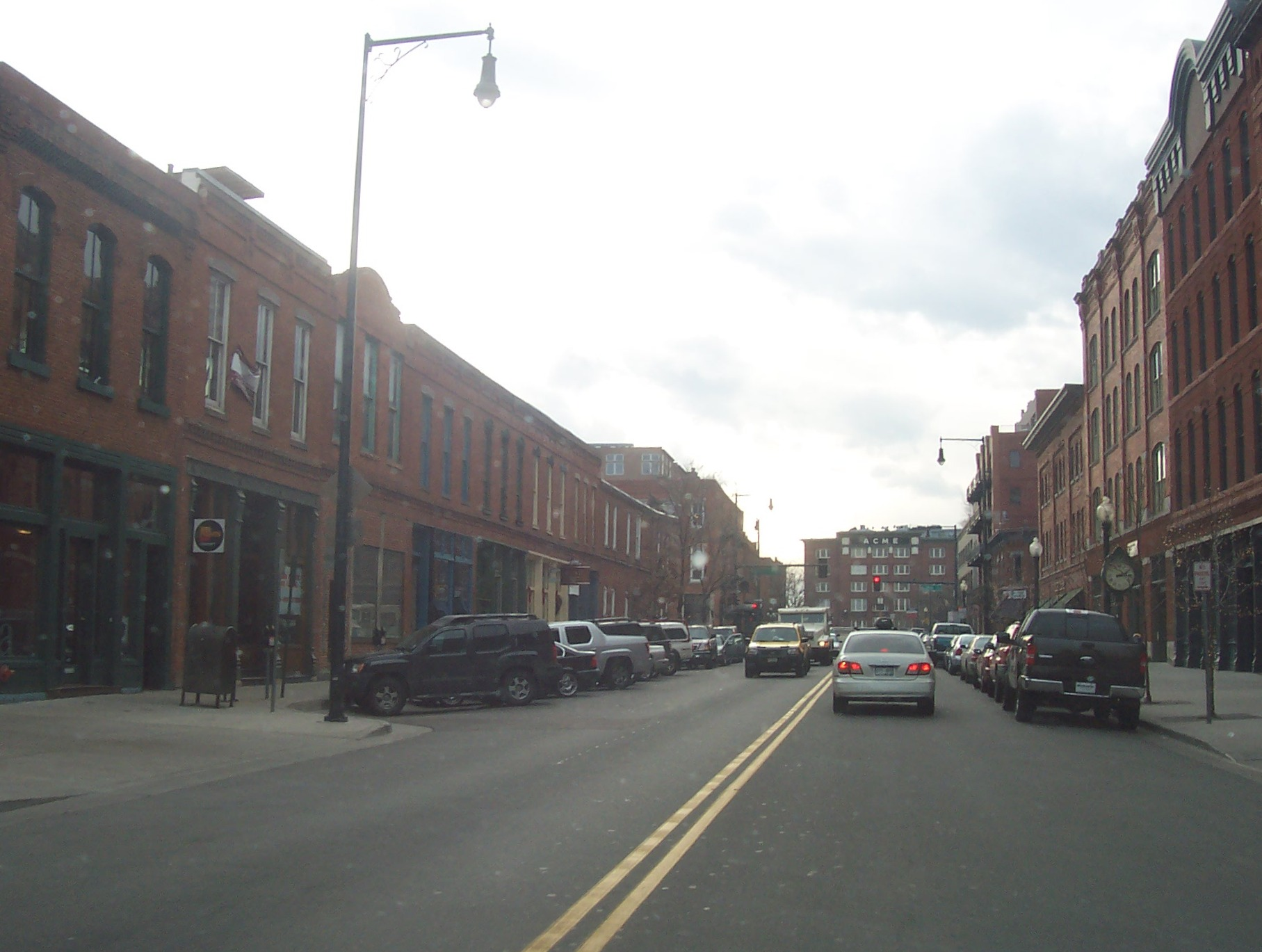
Wazee St. in LoDo

The Lower Downtown Historic District, known as LoDo, was created by the enactment of a zoning ordinance by Denver City Council in March 1988. The resolution's intent was to encourage historic preservation and to promote economic and social vitality in Denver's founding neighborhood at a time when it still held significant historic and architectural value. The status granted by this special designation provided protection to the community's archivable resources and to the 127 contributing historic structures that remained after roughly 20% of Lower Downtown's buildings had been demolished through DURA policies in the 1960s and 1970s. LoDo's historic district ordinance includes zoning that restricts building height and encourages mixed-use development. It stipulates strict design guidelines for rehabilitation and new construction. These guidelines have been challenged by out-of-state developers but are vigorously defended by residents.

During this time, the neighborhood began its renaissance and new businesses opened. Gradually LoDo became a destination neighborhood. By the time Coors Field opened on the edge of the LoDo Historic District in 1995, the area had revitalized itself, becoming a new, hip neighborhood filled with clubs, restaurants, art galleries, boutiques, bars, and other businesses. Pepsi Center, located on the other edge of the neighborhood, opened in 1999 and further established the neighborhood as a sport fan's paradise. New residential development came to LoDo, transforming old warehouses into pricey new lofts.

== Geography ==
The LoDo neighborhood, near Denver's Union Station, highlighted on this map of Denver neighborhoods

The B-7 zoned historic district is roughly bordered by:

- Cherry Creek/Speer Boulevard
- Wewatta Street (excluding Union Station)
- 20th Street
- The alley between Market and Larimer Streets

When referring to the greater LoDo area, people often include adjacent neighborhoods that are not a part of the official historic district, but encompass LoDo's sphere of influence. This unofficial greater area includes Larimer Square, the Auraria Campus, Riverfront Park, the Central Platte Valley, Union Station North, River North, and the Ballpark neighborhoods.

LoDo is located in north-central Denver, directly northwest of the downtown CBD, near the confluence of Cherry Creek and the South Platte River.

== Economy ==
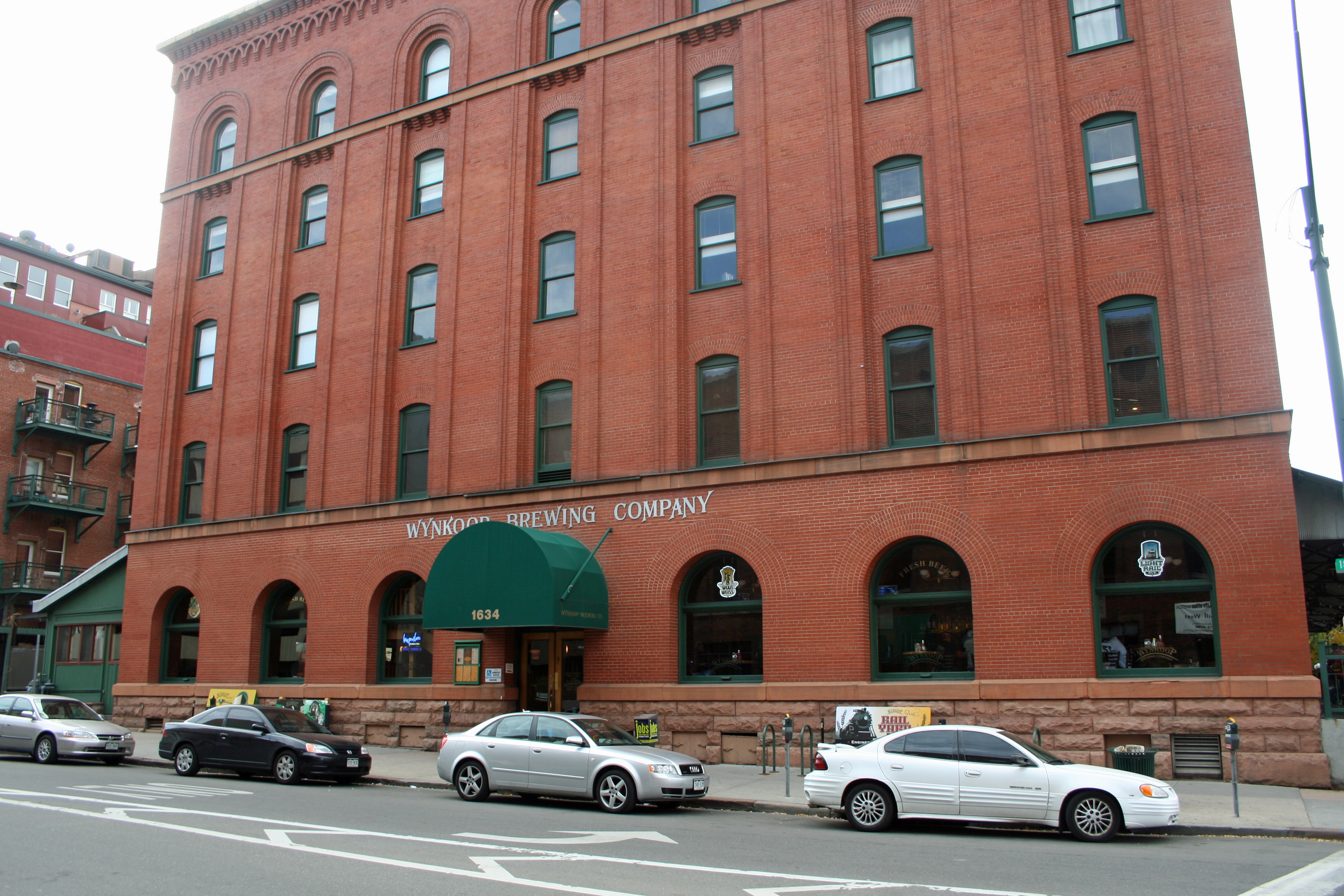
The Wynkoop Brewing Company, located on 18th Street in LoDo

Land in the Lower Downtown Historic District is zoned B-7, which includes building height limitations and encourages mixed-use development and provides strict design guidelines for rehabilitation and new construction. Projects must go through an architectural design review, which allows LoDo to retain its pedestrian scale and historic character as it continues to densify.

The average cost of a home in LoDo in May of 2016 was $701,286.

== Oxford Hotel ==
The Oxford Hotel, built in 1891, is listed on the National Register of Historic Places. The Cruise Room is a hotel bar with historic art deco interior, that was operated as an illicit speakeasy.

== Wynkoop Brewing Company ==
The Wynkoop Brewing Company, a brewpub founded in 1988 by Colorado's 42nd Governor John Hickenlooper with partners Russell Schehrer, Mark Schiffler, and Jerry Williams, sponsors the "Beerdrinker of the Year" competition, which is hosted yearly in one of the banquet halls. The Wynkoop has a large billiards hall on its top floor.

== Arts and culture ==
In the summer of 2006, LoDo hosted the cast members of MTV's popular reality show The Real World, as season 18: The Real World: Denver. Several movies have also been filmed, wholly or in part, in the neighborhood, including the Eddie Murphy film Imagine That (2009). LoDo's combination of contemporary architecture sprinkled among historic buildings, beautiful mountain views, access to Cherry Creek and nearby parks, plus its proximity to two major sporting venues, make it an attractive location for television and movie filming.

The 70+ bars and restaurants in the historic district provide a positive economic impact for the city. However, late night violence, including a fatal shooting, has caused concern. The police are increasing foot patrols and asking private security officers to assist with the 2:00 am "let out" period. A security task force, made up of members of the public, Denver Police, neighborhood and business associations, and bar and club owners has convened to examine the issue.

== Community ==
The LoDo District, Inc., a non-profit neighborhood and business association, represents both the residential and commercial communities, and functions as a LoDo-specific chamber of commerce, visitors bureau, registered neighborhood organization, advocacy agent, and marketing entity. The Lower Downtown Neighborhood Association, the residential association, is a non-profit organization committed to seeking quality living conditions amid the mixed uses of the Lower Downtown area.

Because of the numerous bars and clubs in the area, LoDo is also a popular location for the nightlife of Denver.

== Attractions ==
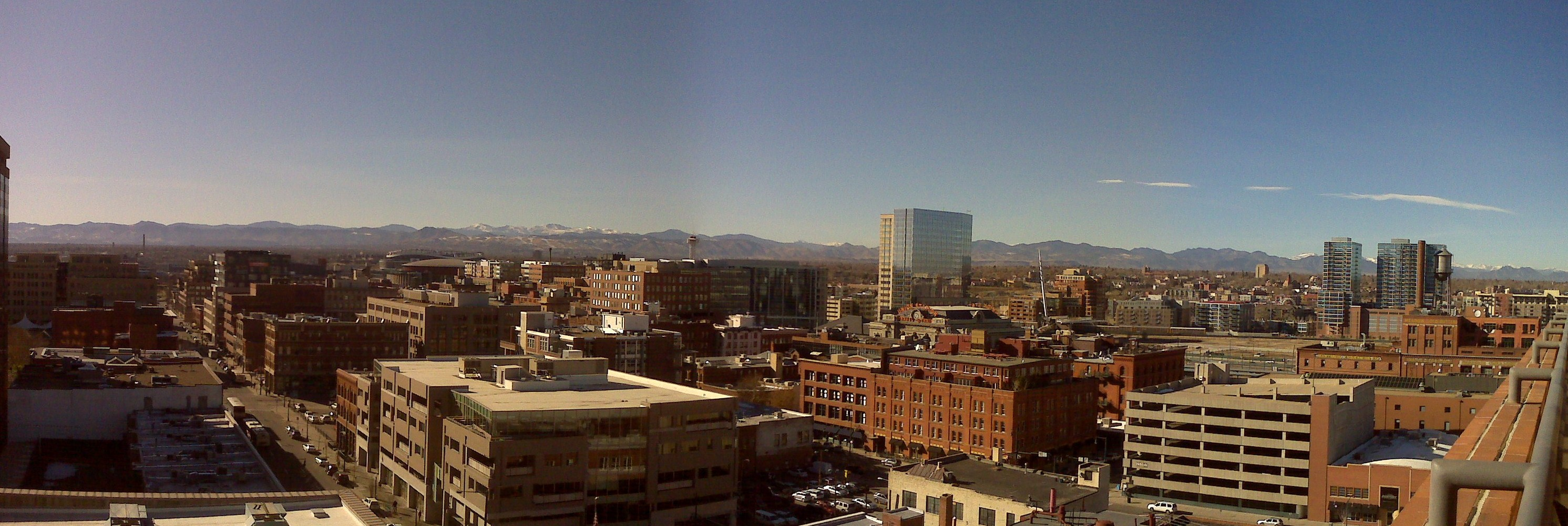
View of LoDo and Mount Blue Sky

- Coors Field
- Ball Arena
- Denver Union Station
- Denver Millennium Bridge
- Museum of Contemporary Art Denver
- Children's Museum of Denver
- Elitch Gardens Amusement Park
- 16th Street
- Tattered Cover

== See also ==
- Bibliography of Colorado
- Geography of Colorado
- History of Colorado
- Index of Colorado-related articles
- List of Colorado-related lists
  - List of neighborhoods in Denver
  - List of populated places in Colorado
- Outline of Colorado
