= Niagara Clifton Bridge =

Historical suspension bridge

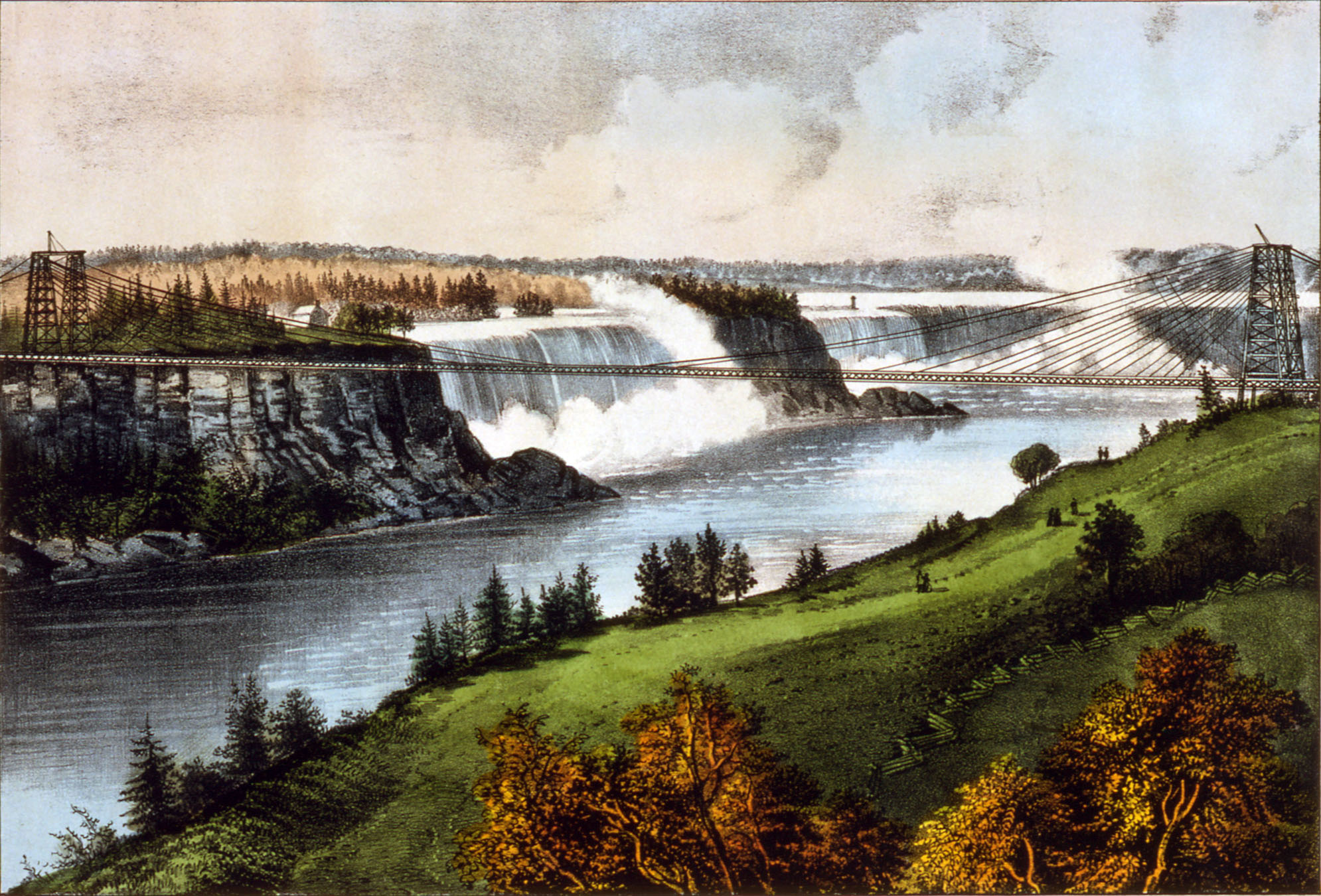
- Print by Currier and Ives of the bridge and American Falls
- Coordinates: 43°05′19″N 79°04′11″W
- Crossed: Niagara River
- Followed by: 2nd Falls View Bridge

Characteristics
- Design: Suspension Bridge with Cable Stays
- Total length: 1,268 ft (386 m)
- Width: 10 ft (3 m) expanded to 17 ft (5 m) in 1887-1888
- Height: 100 ft (30 m)
- Longest span: 1,268 ft (386 m)

History
- Construction start: Winter 1867-1868
- Construction end: December 29, 1868
- Opened: 1869
- Collapsed: January 9, 1889

Location
- Interactive map of Niagara Clifton Bridge

The Niagara Clifton Bridge, also known as the first Falls View Suspension Bridge, was a suspension bridge over the Niagara River between Niagara Falls, New York and Clifton, Ontario. It was designed by Samuel Keefer, with construction starting in 1867. It was officially opened for traffic on January 2, 1869 and was destroyed in a storm on the night of January 9, 1889. At 384m, it served as the worlds longest suspension bridge from 1869-1883 before being overtaken by the 468m long Brooklyn Bridge.

== Replacement ==
Shortly following the collapse of the first Falls View Suspension Bridge, a second bridge of the same design was ordered to be built. Construction began on March 22, 1889 and erection work took only 38 days to complete. It was opened on May 7, only 117 days after the preceding bridge disaster. The second Falls View Suspension Bridge was dismantled in 1898 when construction of the Honeymoon Bridge was complete. The dismantled bridge was moved to Queenston–Lewiston where it was re-erected and became the second Queenston–Lewiston Bridge and remained in service until 1962 when it was replaced with a larger and more modern bridge. The suspension bridge was finally dismantled and sold to a Buffalo, New York firm. The bridge closest to its former position is the current Rainbow Bridge.

== See also ==
- List of international bridges in North America
