= Inderhavnsbroen =

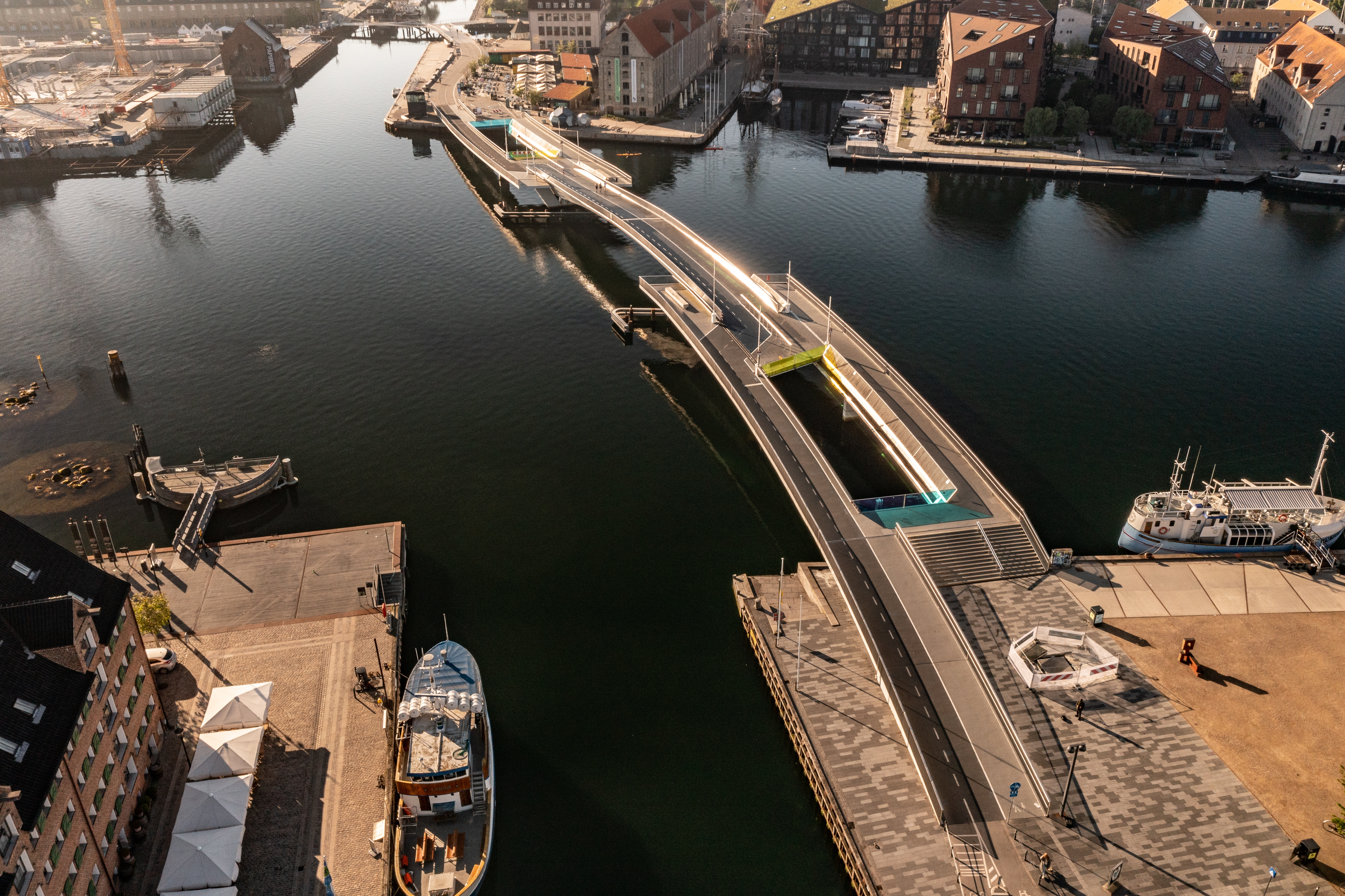
- Aerial view of the bridge
- Coordinates: 55°40′43″N 12°35′42″E
- Carries: Pedestrian and bicycle traffic
- Crosses: Copenhagen Inner Harbour
- Locale: Nyhavn; Christianshavn

Location
- Interactive map of Inderhavnsbroen

Inderhavnsbroen (lit. 'The Inner Harbour Bridge') is a bridge across the Inner Harbour in Copenhagen, Denmark. It is a 180 metres (590 ft) combined pedestrian and bicyclist bridge directed east-west. The bridge is joined to Nyhavn (west) and Christianshavn (east).

The bridge was designed by Flint & Neill with Studio Bednarski and Hardesty & Hanover, and opened to the public on 7 July 2016.

The "design" includes a bulge that requires cyclists to make a sharp turn. This feature has attracted criticism. One of the unusual turns was caused by a construction error that meant the original two ends of the bridge didn't meet up in the middle.

== See also ==
- Lacey V. Murrow Memorial Bridge, a similar bridge that also had a "bulge" associated with at least one fatal incident
