= Denver Millennium Bridge =

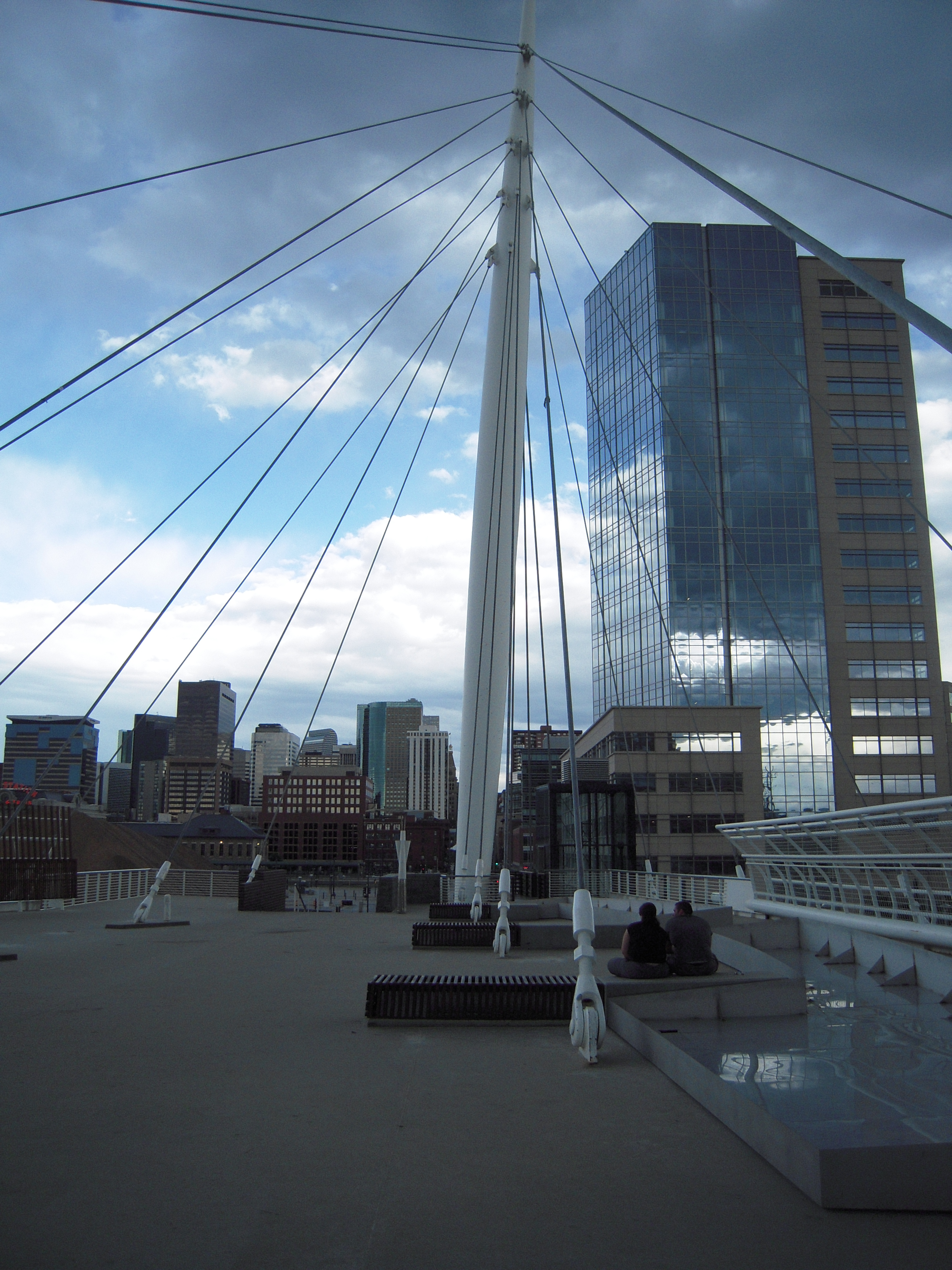
- Mast of Denver's Millennium Bridge rises to 200 feet (61m), connecting to the footbridge's deck and foundation anchors with post-tensioned steel cables.
- Coordinates: 39.754389°N 105.0040001°W
- Carries: Pedestrians
- Crosses: Railroad, Light Rail system
- Locale: Denver, Colorado, United States

Characteristics
- Design: Structural steel, post-tensioned cable-stayed bridge
- Total length: 130 feet (40m)
- Width: 80 feet (24m)
- Height: 25 feet (8m)
- Clearance above: 200 feet (61m)

History
- Construction cost: $9 million
- Opened: April 22, 2002

Location
- Interactive map of Denver Millennium Bridge

The Denver Millennium Bridge is the world's first cable-stayed bridge using post-tensioned structural construction. Located near LoDo (Denver's lower downtown), in Riverfront Park, it connects the 16th Street Mall with the Commons Park in the Central Platte Valley District of the Union Station neighborhood. The bridge is one of three pedestrian bridges between Downtown Denver and the Highland neighborhood.

== Design ==
The name, Denver Millennium Bridge, honors a milestone in time in addition to Denver's architectural development. To meet the structural challenge of spanning 130 feet (40 m) without a steep increase in elevation, the deck's structure must be as thin as possible while remaining stable. The bridge uses a steel frame that derives its stiffness from tension by using a single mast that is tilted toward one end of the bridge. Cables supporting the bridge deck are welded to both sides of the mast, but cable to foundation anchors attach to the mast only from the side of the bridge toward which the mast is tilted.

Supportive tension is created by using the mast as a lever to pull the deck up into a shallow arc, keeping the opposite end of the bridge secured by two steel rods. With the mast raised, concrete was poured onto the metal deck frame, pushing the deck into place and applying tension to the cables. The post-tensioned structural construction allows for a substantially thinner 6-inch-thick reinforced concrete slab-on-metal deck. The deck structure is supported by secondary I-Beams, and has an average width of 80 feet (24 m).

== History ==
Preliminary work on the $9-million footbridge began in 1999. The structural and civil engineering firm Ove Arup & Partners, in conjunction with the architectural design company ArchitectureDenver, developed the design.

Contractor Edward Kraemer & Sons, Inc. implemented the design, subcontracting Colorado Bridge and Iron to fabricate the steel components. The mast was constructed of cone-shaped steel plate sections welded together to form a 3-foot (1 m) base, 7-foot (2 m) midsection and 1.5-foot (.5 m) tip diameter.

Glass-enclosed elevator towers on both ends of the footbridge accommodate pedestrians who have difficulty climbing the stairs leading up to either end of the bridge from street level. The Millennium Bridge was completed and officially opened by Denver Mayor Wellington Webb on April 22, 2002.

On April 24, 2014, a $1-million renovation began on the footbridge to make the bridge more accessible to pedestrians, along with LED lighting upgrades to improve energy efficiency.

== See also ==
- Platte River Bridge
- Highland Bridge

== Awards ==
- 2002 Urban Design Merit Award, Denver Chapter American Institute of Architects
- Gold Award, New York Association of Consulting Engineers "Engineering Excellence Awards 2003"

== Photo gallery ==
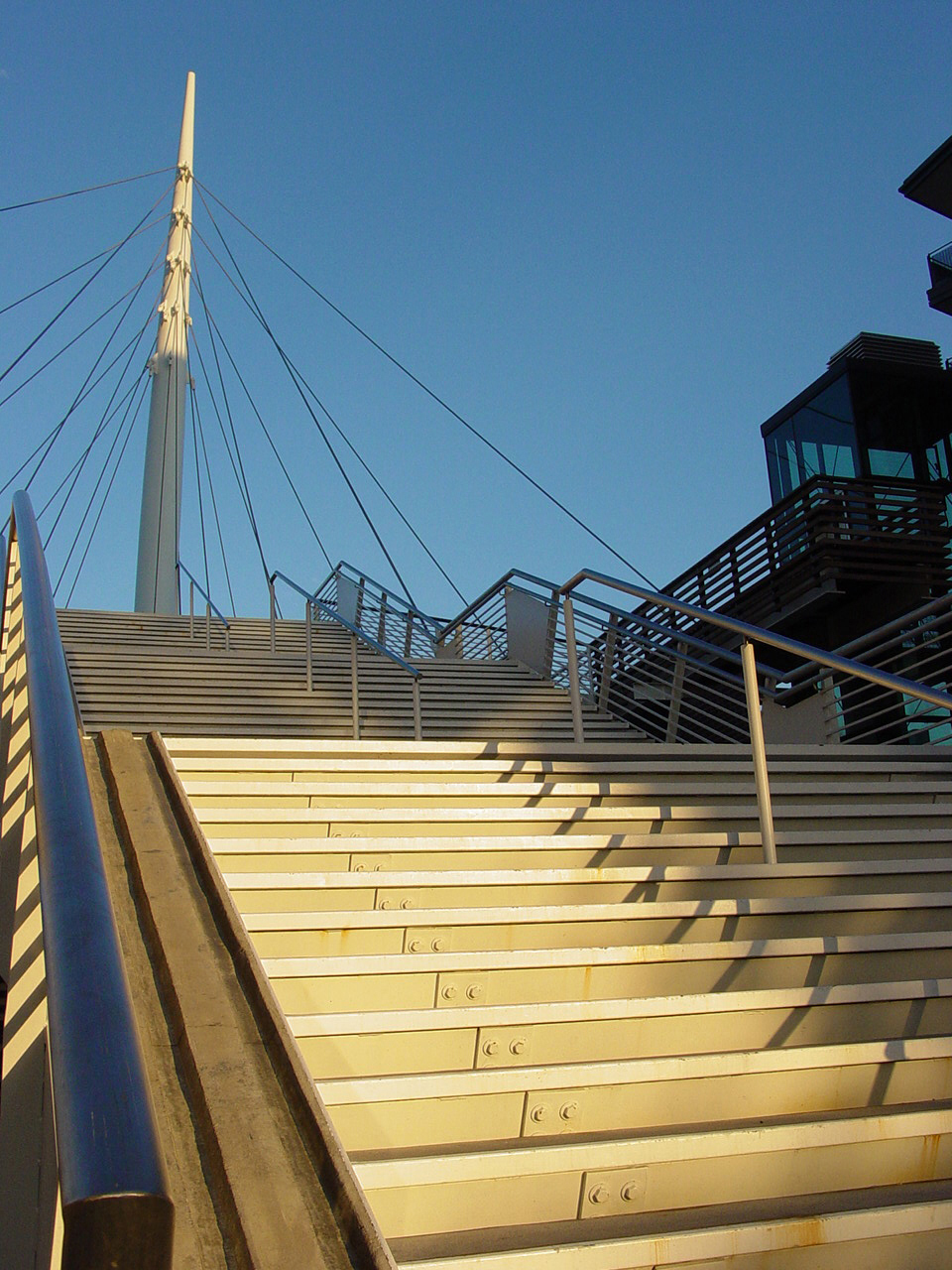
Stairs and a glass elevator lead pedestrians to the landing of Denver's Millennium Bridge.

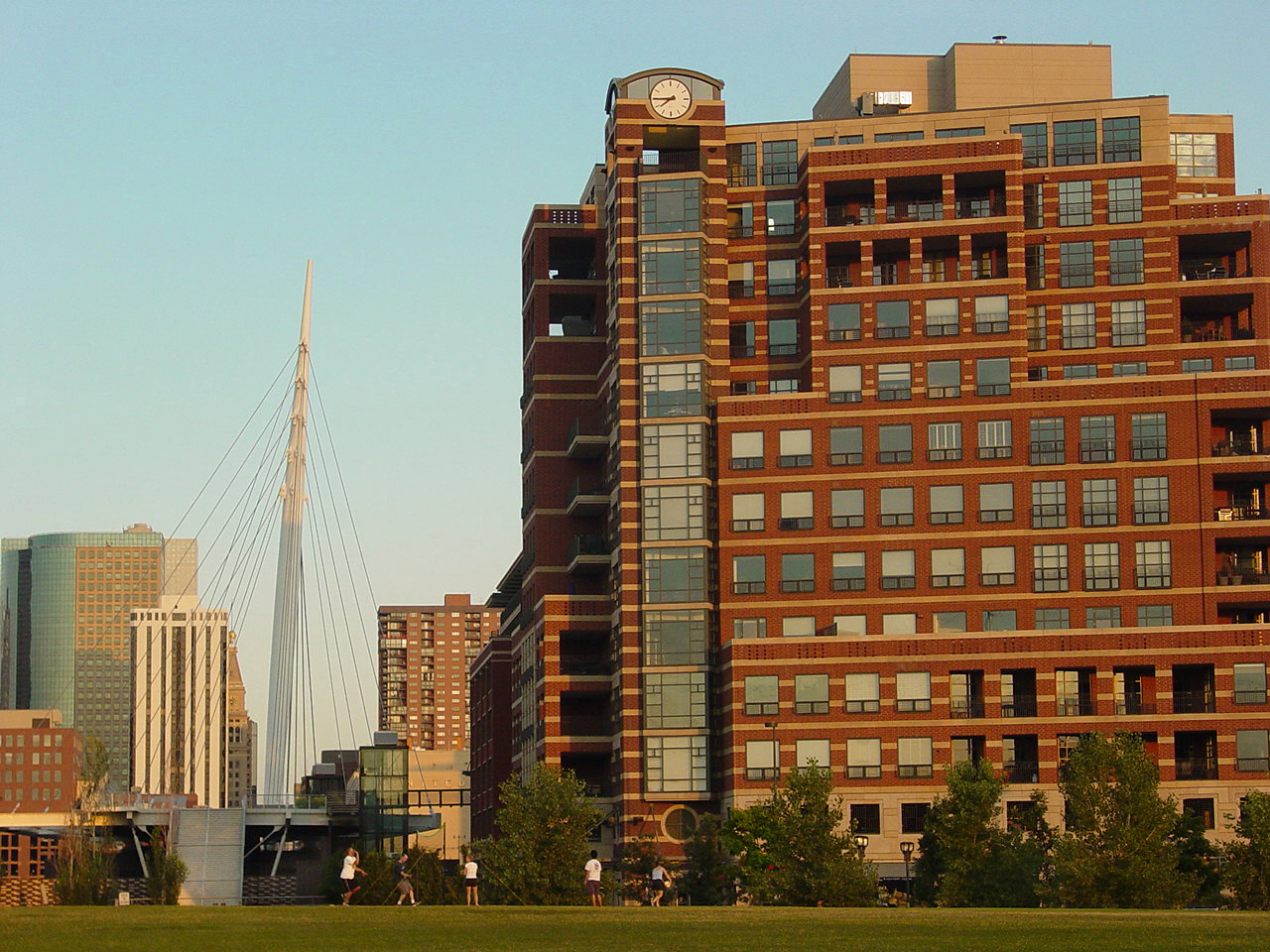
Denver's Millennium Bridge connects Riverfront Park in the Central Platte Valley neighborhood with downtown's 16th Street pedestrian mall.

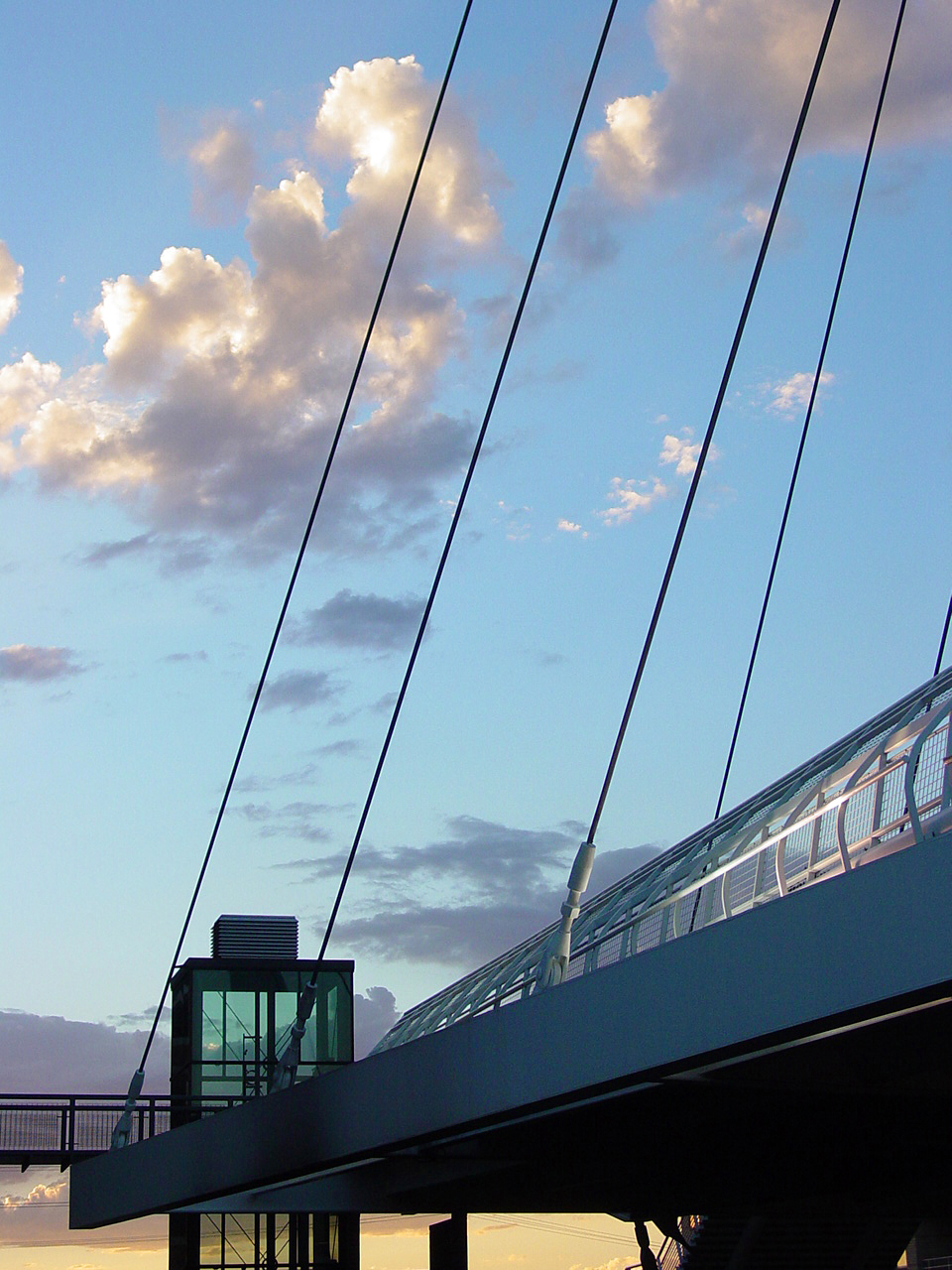
Dusk falls on the west end of Denver's Millennium Bridge.
