= Highland Bridge =

- Coordinates: 39.7580°N 105.0088°W
- Carries: Pedestrians
- Crosses: I-25 (Valley Highway)
- Locale: Denver, Colorado

Characteristics
- Total length: 325 feet (99 m)

History
- Construction cost: $5.2 million
- Opened: December 16, 2006

The Highland Bridge is the third of three pedestrian bridges to connect Downtown Denver with the Highland neighborhood. The bridge crosses the Valley Highway (Interstate 25) between Platte Street and Central Street as an extension of the 16th Street Mall.

The bridge was opened on December 16, 2006. It is 325 feet long and cost US $5.2 million to build.

== See also ==
- Denver Millennium Bridge
- Platte River Bridge
