= Platte River Bridge =

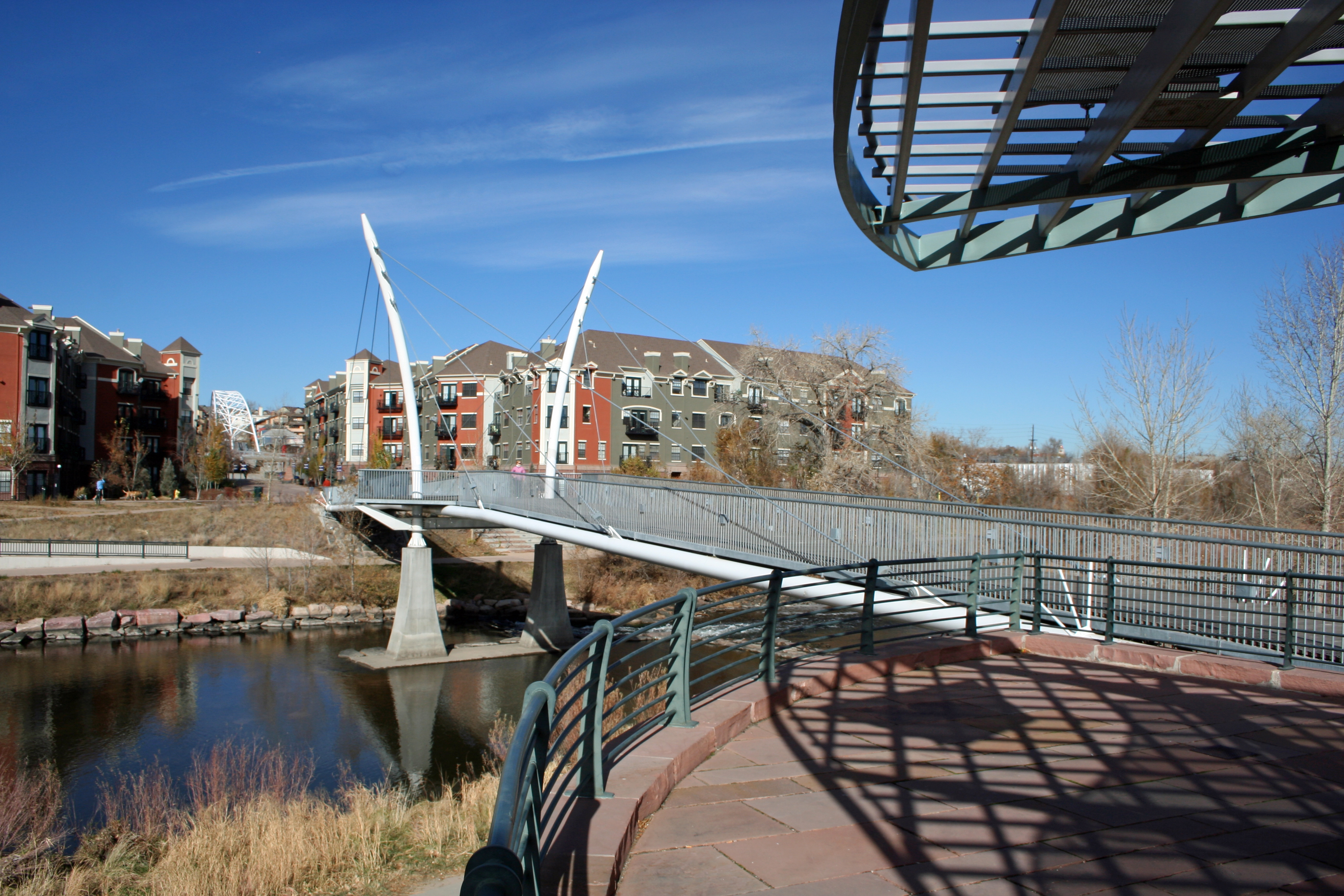
- The Platte River Pedestrian Bridge in Denver, Colorado.
- Coordinates: 39.7564°N 105.0068°W
- Carries: Pedestrians
- Locale: Denver, Colorado

Characteristics
- Design: Cable-stayed bridge
- Total length: 325 feet (99 m)

The Platte River Bridge is the second of three pedestrian bridges to connect Downtown Denver with the Highland neighborhood.

The cable-stayed bridge crosses the South Platte River between Commons Park and Commons West Apartments along the former 16th street viaduct.

== See also ==
- Denver Millennium Bridge
- Highland Bridge
